= Archer Midnight =

An American electric vertical take-off and landing aircraft

General information
- Type: eVTOL transport
- National origin: United States
- Manufacturer: Archer Aviation
- Status: Full-scale prototype

History
- Introduction date: Late 2020s (expected)

The Archer Midnight is an American electric vertical take-off and landing (eVTOL) aircraft designed by Archer Aviation. The aircraft was unveiled on November 17, 2022, at an event in Palo Alto, California, and will be Archer's planned production aircraft. As of mid-2026, Midnight is undergoing piloted EVTOL tests and has not yet flown with a human on board in EVTOL configuration.

== Flight History ==
On October 25, 2023, the Midnight prototype completed its first flight.

On January 30, 2024, Archer Aviation announced Midnight successfully completed Phase 1 of its flight test campaign.

Phase 2 was completed on June 8, 2024, when Midnight completed its first remote transition flight without a human on board. Archer flew over 400 test flights in 2024.

The Midnight aircraft's first remote test flight outside the United States took place in July 2025 at Al Bateen Executive Airport in Abu Dhabi, where it was evaluated under local environmental conditions as in preparation for regional certification.

In February 2026, Archer Aviation announced plans to attempt a piloted transition, as well as integrate Starlink satellite connectivity into its Midnight electric air taxi aircraft. The system is intended to provide reliable communication between the aircraft and ground operations while supporting future urban air mobility services.

Phase 3 of the Federal Aviation Administration (FAA) certification process was completed in April 2026, becoming the first eVTOL manufacturer to reach this stage.

In August 2026, the company announced Midnight had successfully completed a FAA-supervised piloted roundtrip. Completing phase 4, it marks a major milestone to launch Midnight operations under the White House's eIPP program. The aircraft departed from Salinas Municipal Airport, landed at Monterey Regional Airport and made a return flight.

== Order history ==
Caption text
Date	Company/country	Agreement	Order qty.	Ref.
July 15, 2025	USAF	Evaluation	1	
August 13, 2024	Future Flight Global (FFG)	MoU	116 - $580M	
January 23, 2025	Serbia	MoU	3	
October 20, 2025	Korean Air	MoU	100	
Example	Example	Example	Example	

- In February 2024, 3 Midnight aircraft were being constructed at the facility in San Jose, California.

== Design ==
Archer's Midnight is a piloted, four-passenger aircraft designed to perform rapid back-to-back flights with minimal charge time between flights. Midnight has 12 propellers: six tilt props in the front of the wing for forward and VTOL flight and six aft propellers that are stationary for VTOL flight only. Midnight is designed to travel at up to 150 mph (240 km/h) with a maximum range of 100 miles (161 km). The aircraft is powered by six independent battery packs.

== Specifications ==
Data from TransportUP

General characteristics

- Crew: 1 (autopilot)
- Capacity: 4 passengers, 180 kg (400 lb) payload
- Powerplant: 1 × horizontal electric
- Powerplant: 12 × vertical electric

Performance

- Cruise speed: 150 mph (240 km/h, 130 kn)
- Range: 100 mi (161 km, 87 nmi)
- Service ceiling: 3,000 ft (900 m)

== See also ==
- Air taxi

Aircraft of comparable role, configuration, and era

- CityAirbus
- Boeing PAV
- Lilium Jet
- Opener BlackFly
- Beta Technologies Alia
- Wisk Cora

Related lists

- List of electric aircraft
