= Volansi =

San Francisco-based drone delivery company

- Company type: Privately held company
- Industry: Logistics
- Genre: Delivery drone
- Founded: 2015
- Founders: Hannan Parvizian; Wesley Zheng
- Defunct: 2022
- Headquarters: San Francisco, California, United States
- Key people: Hannan Parvizian, CEO
- Website: volansi.com

Volansi (formerly Volans-i) was an American unmanned aerial vehicle logistics company. Founded in San Francisco, California in 2015, the company utilized VTOL drones for commercial, medical and defense operations. Volansi ceased operations in 2022.

== History ==
The company was founded in 2015 by former Tesla, Inc. senior operations analyst Hannan Parvizian and Wesley Zheng, who had been working for electric car manufacturer Lucid Motors. While at Stanford University, Zheng was a part of a team who researched an improved model of lithium–sulfur battery for use in renewable energy systems. Parvizian was inspired to create the company due to logistics issues that Tesla was facing, where manufacturing parts could not be sourced in a timely manner. The company was originally funded by Y Combinator, and the company presented their VTOL drones at a showcase in Austin, Texas in 2017. In July 2017, the company led a project that set "a new U.S. record for long-distance urban delivery by drone, using cellphone networks to help navigate a simulated 97-mile trip". The company opened a production facility in Concord, California.

Volansi first became involved in humanitarian relief in 2018, by working together with Merck & Co. and Direct Relief to develop a drone-based medical supply delivery system in Puerto Rico, securing inter-island flight permissions for the project. The company's preparations for creating the first hurricane relief drone were scampered in 2019 due to the damage caused by Hurricane Dorian to The Bahamas.

In March 2020, Volansi hired former Amazon Prime Air co-founder Daniel Buchmueller as their Chief Technology Officer. The company won the Airmanship Special Award at the 2020 African Drone Forum. The same year it began testing for vaccine deliveries in North Carolina with Merck.

In July 2022, Volansi filed for assignment for benefit of creditors (ABC), an alternative to bankruptcy.

== Operations ==
Volansi's facilities were based in Concord, California, with global operations. The drone services were offered on-demand, for commercial, medical and defense purposes. Drones could deliver packages were able to any location with a suitable flat surface, including construction sites and ships at sea. The company received several exceptions to Federal Aviation Administration rules to enable operations.

Volansi's VOLY M20 model had a maximum 350 mile range, depending on the payload and weather conditions. The company had also tested prototypes with a 500-mile range, and a top speed of 67 miles per hour.
