= Wingcopter =

German aerospace company

Wingcopter GmbH
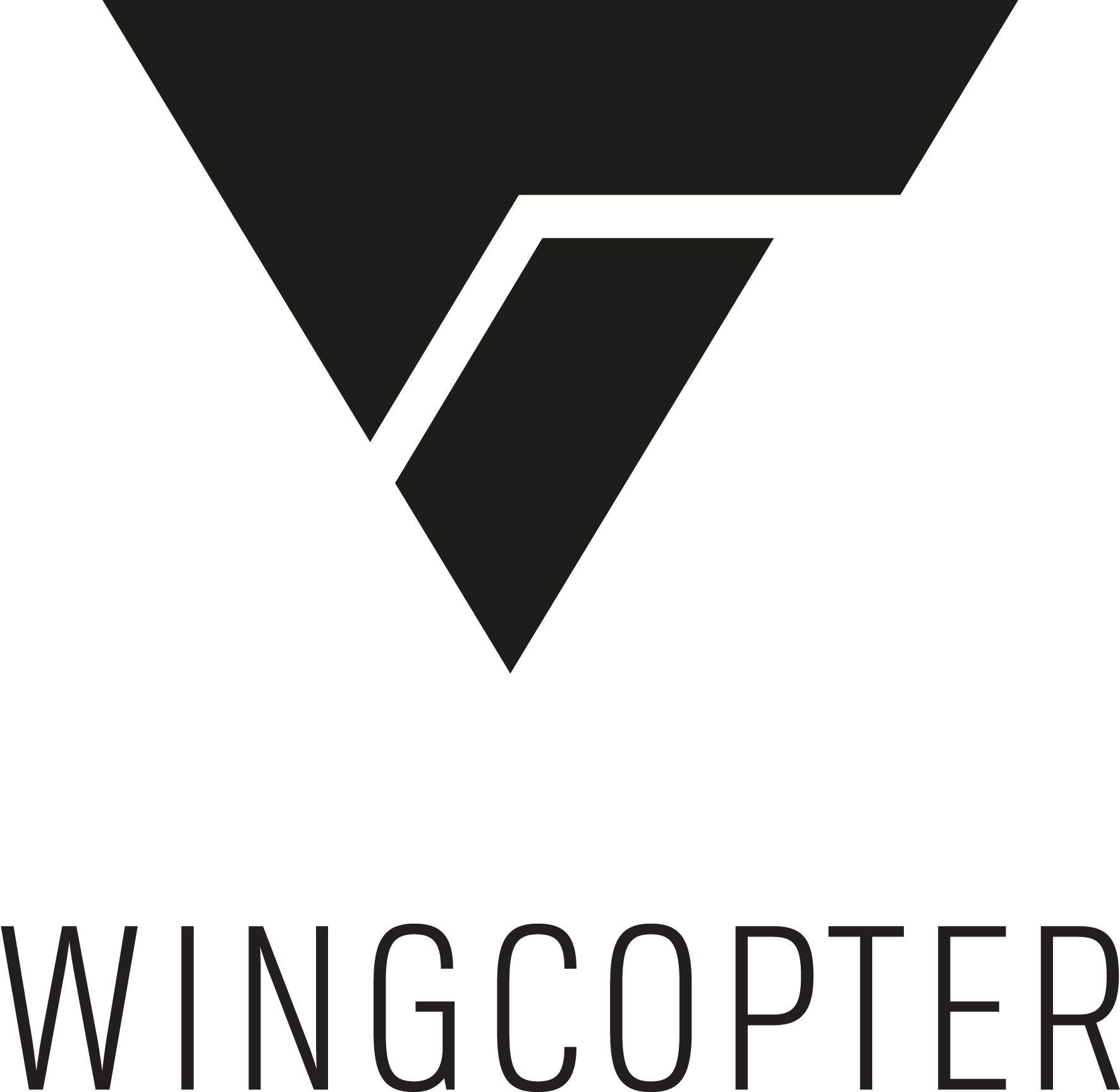

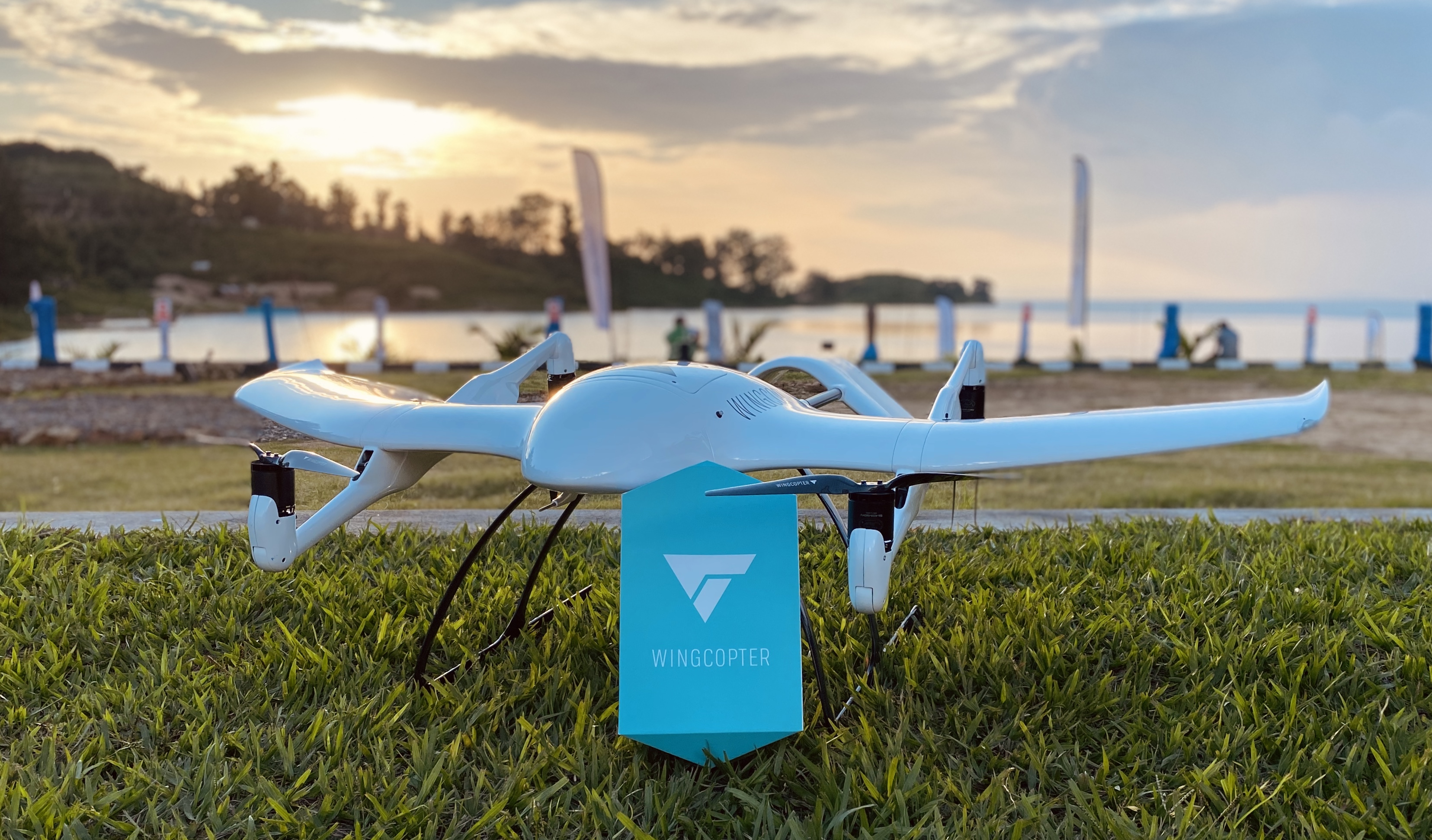
- Wingcopter drone on Bugarura Island, Rwanda
- Type: Private
- Industry: Aerospace, Logistics
- Founded: 2017; 9 years ago
- Founder: Tom Plümmer, Jonathan Hesselbarth, Ansgar Kadura
- Area served: Africa, Europe
- Key people: Tom Plümmer, CEO; Jonathan Hesselbarth, CTO; Ansgar Kadura, CSO
- Products: Wingcopter 178 and Wingcopter 198
- Number of employees: 100-150

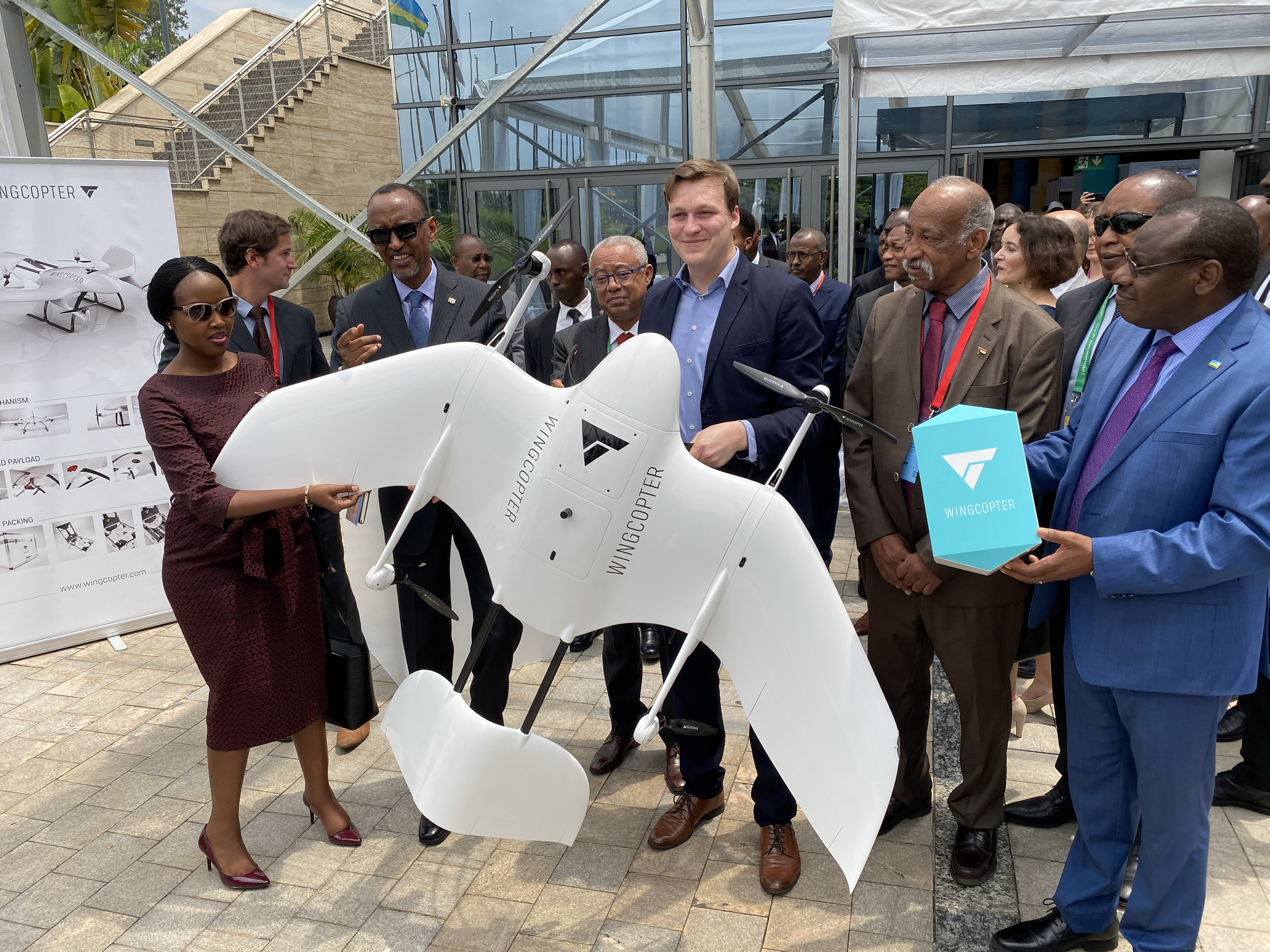
Wingcopter 178 being shown to Paul Kagame.

Wingcopter GmbH is a German aerospace company that designs and manufactures unmanned eVTOL delivery drones capable of providing last-mile delivery as well as mapping, surveying, and inspection. Their flagship drone, Wingcopter 178 Heavy Lift (HL), set the Guinness world speed record for remote-controlled tilt-rotor aircraft in 2018, flying at an average speed of 240.6 km/h. To date, the company has partnered with commercial and humanitarian organizations to perform drone delivery of critical supplies in Africa, the South Pacific, Ireland, and Scotland. During the COVID-19 pandemic, Wingcopter partnered with Thales, Skyports, and the NHS to provide beyond visual line of sight (BVLOS) delivery of medical test samples and other supplies to a hospital on a remote Scottish island. The company has been recognized by the World Economic Forum as "2020 Technology Pioneer". The company is amongst ten other drone companies to be selected by FAA to participate in a type certification program for delivery drones.

== History ==
Wingcopter GmbH was founded in 2017 by Jonathan Hesselbarth, Tom Plümmer, and Ansgar Kadura in Darmstadt, Germany. In 2018, the company partnered with DHL and the Deutsche Gesellschaft für Internationale Zusammenarbeit (GIZ) GmbH on behalf of the German Federal Ministry for Economic Cooperation and Development (BMZ) to deliver medicine and critical supplies to the Ukerewe island district of Lake Victoria, Tanzania. In 2019, the company partnered with UNICEF to set up an on-demand delivery network, supplying 19 remote villages with vaccines from one central hub on the South Pacific island of Pentecost, Vanuatu. The Wingcopter 178 HL has also been used to survey whales in the Arctic region. During the 2020 African Drone Forum, Wingcopter was judged as the winner of the Emergency Delivery category of the Flying Competition and received a special award for its safety procedures. In 2020, Corecam Capital Partners invested several million euros into the company as seed funding In January 2021, Wingcopter raised $22 million in its Seris A funding round, intending to expand its operations into the United States of America. Its investors include Xplorer Capital, which has previously invested in ride-hailing service Uber and self-driving car start-up Zoox.

In May 2022, Wingcopter announced a partnership with Continental Drones designed to establish a delivery network spanning 49 countries across Sub-Sahara Africa. The deal sets the goal of deploying 12,000 of Wingcopter’s 198 drone systems over the course of the next 5 years.

In May 2023, the European Investment Bank invested €40 million in Wingcopter to scale up electric delivery drones and logistics services.

== Aircraft ==
=== W178 ===
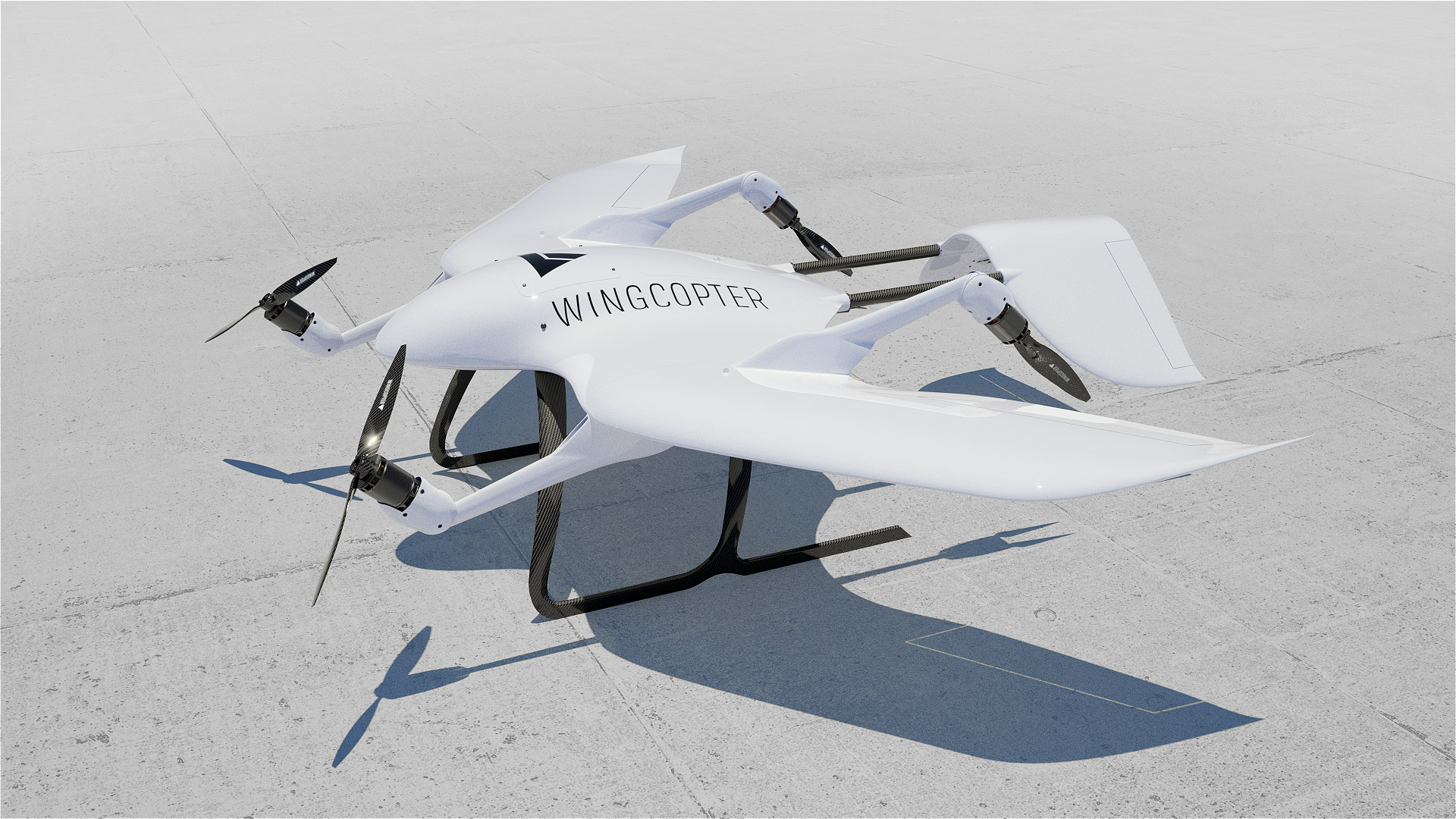
Wingcopter 178 HL

Wingcopter 178 is the first mass-produced version of the Wingcopter drones which first took flight in early 2013. At present, the drone has an external dimension of 178 cm x 132 cm x 52 cm and can carry a payload of up to 6 kg in its external transportation box measuring 103 cm x 87 cm x 57. The aircraft is capable of beyond visual line of sight flight and can transition from hover to fixed-wing flight configuration during forward flight by making use of its proprietary tiltrotor mechanism. To deliver its payload, the drone can employ a winch mechanism to slow-drop a single-use cargo box at the location without the need for landing. It can also deliver and collect cargo by landing at the destination to enable two-way delivery of medical samples, lab results, and supplies.

=== W198 ===
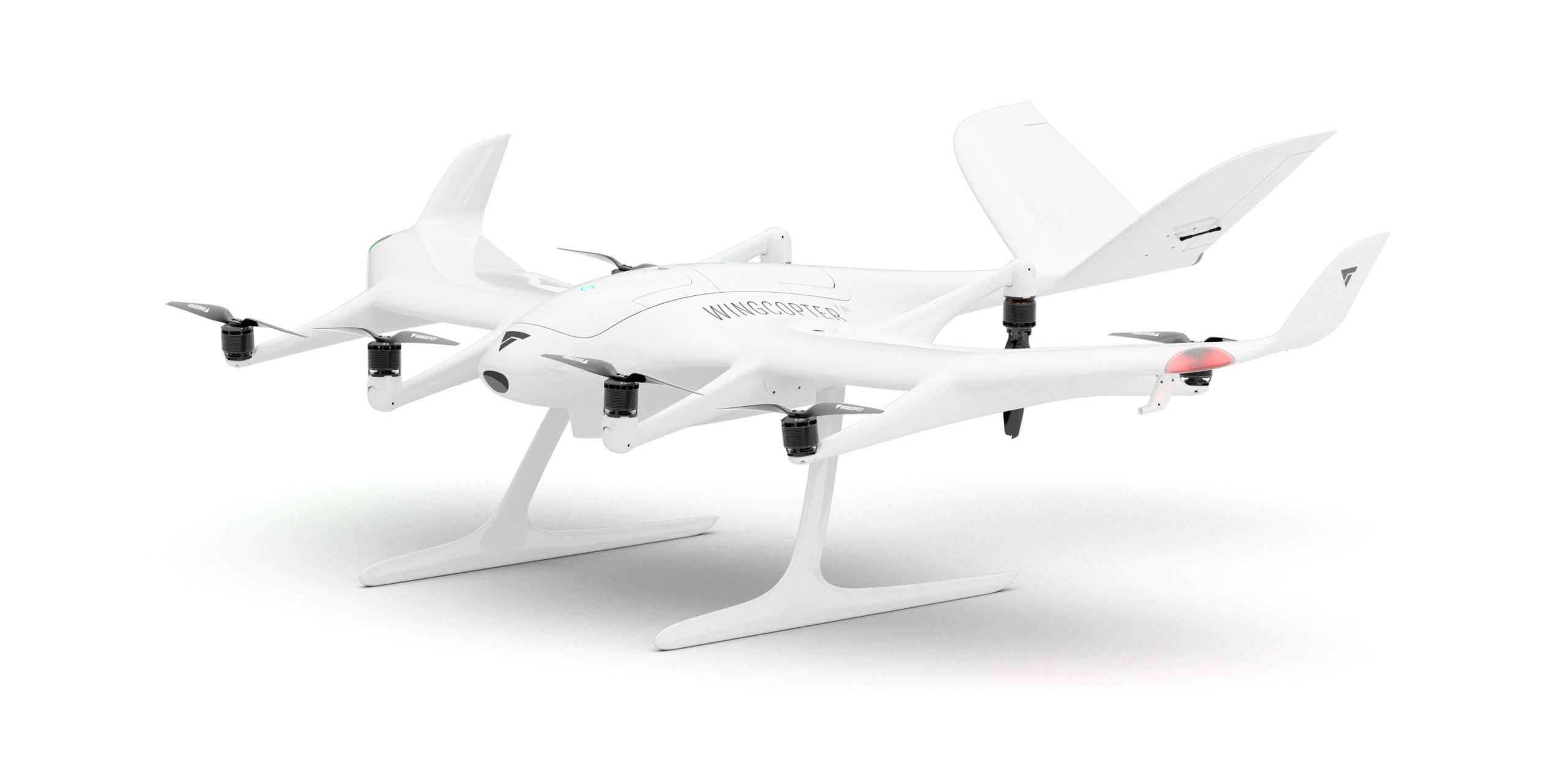
Wingcopter 198

Wingcopter 198 is the latest commercial drone launched by wingcopter in April 2021 and is the world's first triple drop delivery drone. It has an external dimension of 198 x 152 x 65 cm and can carry up to three packages up to 5 kg. The drones, have automated sensors and software to avoid obstacles and drop parcels at designated sites, enabling one operator to monitor and control up to 10 of these new drones.

== Projects ==
=== Humanitarian mission ===
As part of a humanitarian aid project in Malawi in 2019/20, medicines were delivered by Wingcopter to remote areas that were partially cut off from the outside world by a flood. Wingcopter has also been active with UNICEF and DHL in delivering vaccines and other medications in Vanuatu and some African nations. Along with UNICEF and African Drone & Data Academy (ADDA), it aims to use Wingcopter drones to improve health supply chains during COVID-19 and to open up new long-term opportunities for Africa's youth. It was announced as one of the winners of the German government’s €24 million COVID-19 hackathon to combat corona-related repercussions in Africa. As a part of this project, Wingcopter envisions setting up a locally operated delivery drone network in Malawi to support the local healthcare system. In parallel, the partners will also build local capacity through two distinct training programs for 160 Malawian youths. After proving the concept’s viability and successful implementation in Malawi, Wingcopter and UNICEF plan to adapt the concept and scale to Rwanda.

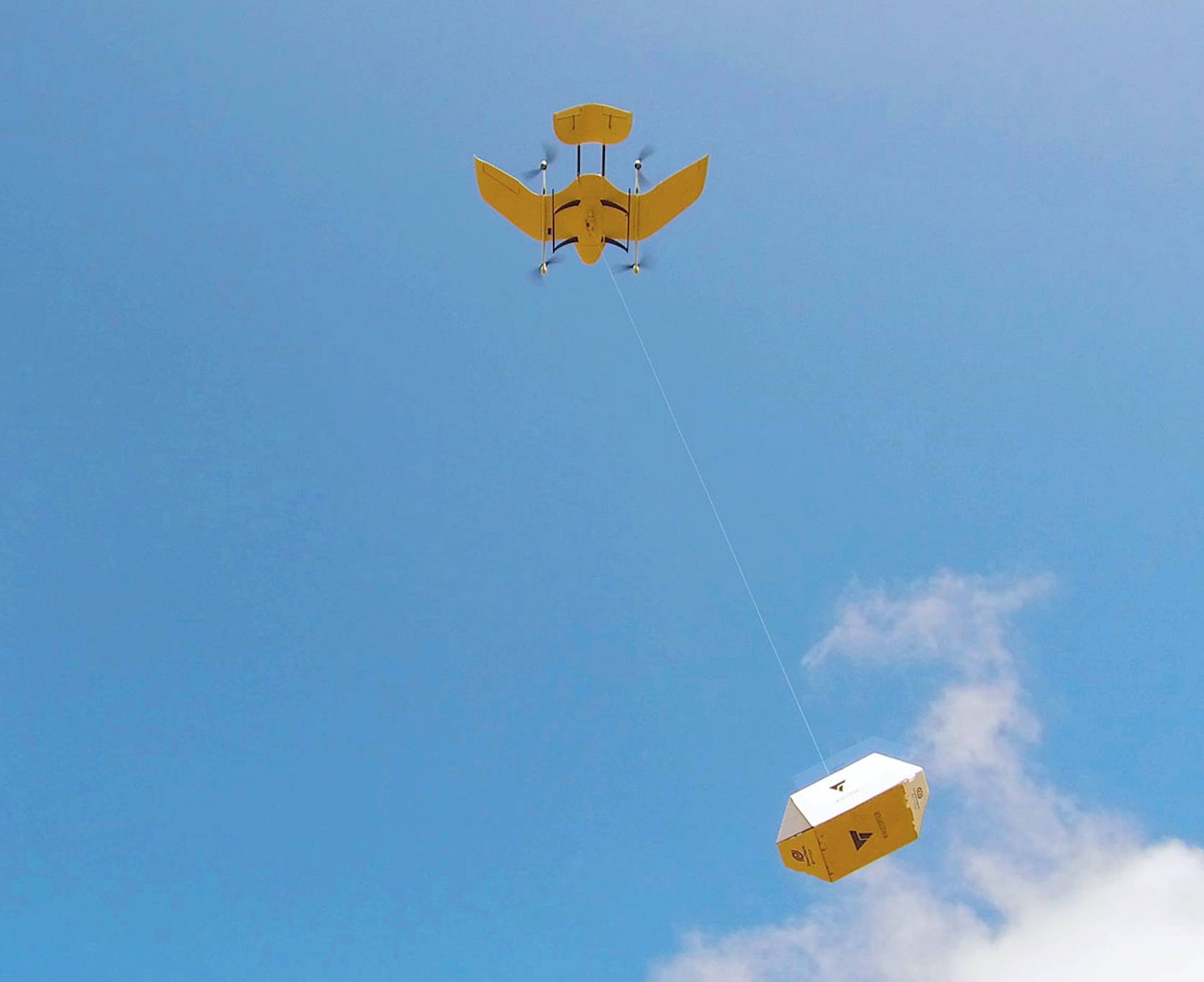
Wingcopter delivering vaccines in Vanuatu through its winch mechanism

=== Partnership with UPS ===
In 2020, Wingcopter partnered with UPS to develop the next generation of package delivery drones. Together, they will be working towards building a diverse fleet of drones with varying capabilities to meet even more potential customer needs. As part of this collaboration, both companies will work toward earning regulatory certification for Wingcopter drones to make commercial delivery flights in the United States and beyond.

=== Inter-city delivery ===
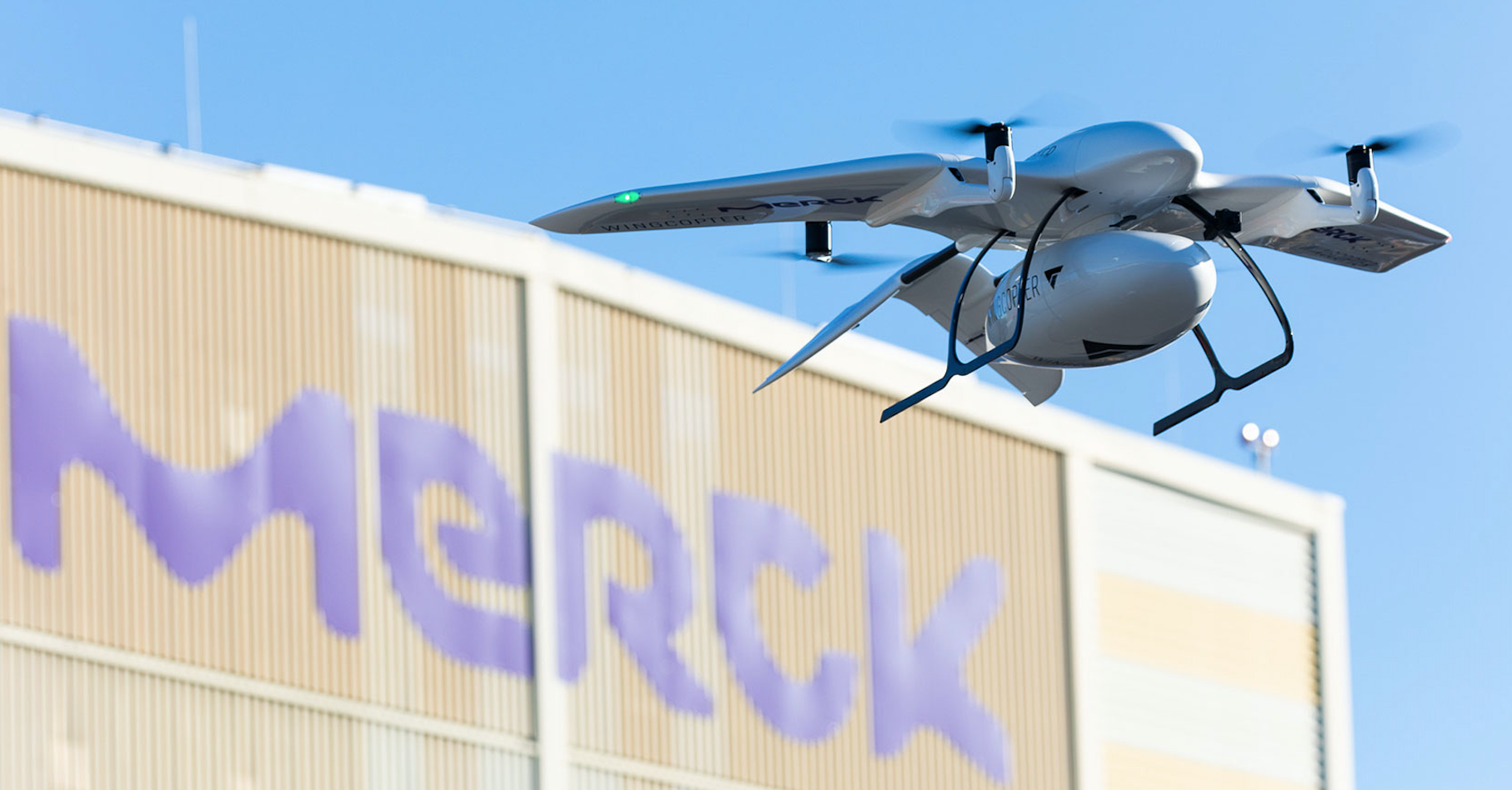
Wingcopter performing inter-city delivery for Merck Group.

Wingcopter in partnership with Frankfurt University of Applied Sciences has teamed up with Merck to transport pigment samples from a Merck site in Gernsheim, Germany to a lab in Darmstadt (around 25 km). The proposed project aims to replace the existing slower, less sustainable, and more expensive van delivery program.

== Drone specifications ==
=== Wingcopter 178 / 198 ===
Data from several sources

General characteristics

- Crew: None (self-piloted) Wingcopter 178, Wingcopter 198
- Capacity: , Wingcopter 198 5-6 kg (13 lb) up to 3 different packages
- Wingspan: 1.78 m (5 ft 10 in) Wingcopter 198: 1.98
- Powerplant: 4 × (4 for hovering and 2 for forward flight) / Wingcopter 198: 8 Electric

Performance

- Maximum speed: 240 km/h (150 mph, 130 kn) Wingcopter 198: 150 km/h (93 mph; 81 kn)
- Range: 120 km (75 mi, 65 nmi) Wingcopter 198 up to 75 km (47 mi)

Construction: Composite (fiberglass and carbon fiber)

== See also ==
- Unmanned aerial vehicle

Related development

- Boeing Cargo Air Vehicle

Related lists

- List of electric aircraft
