= LEO Flight =

American eVTOL aircraft company

LEO Flight Corporation
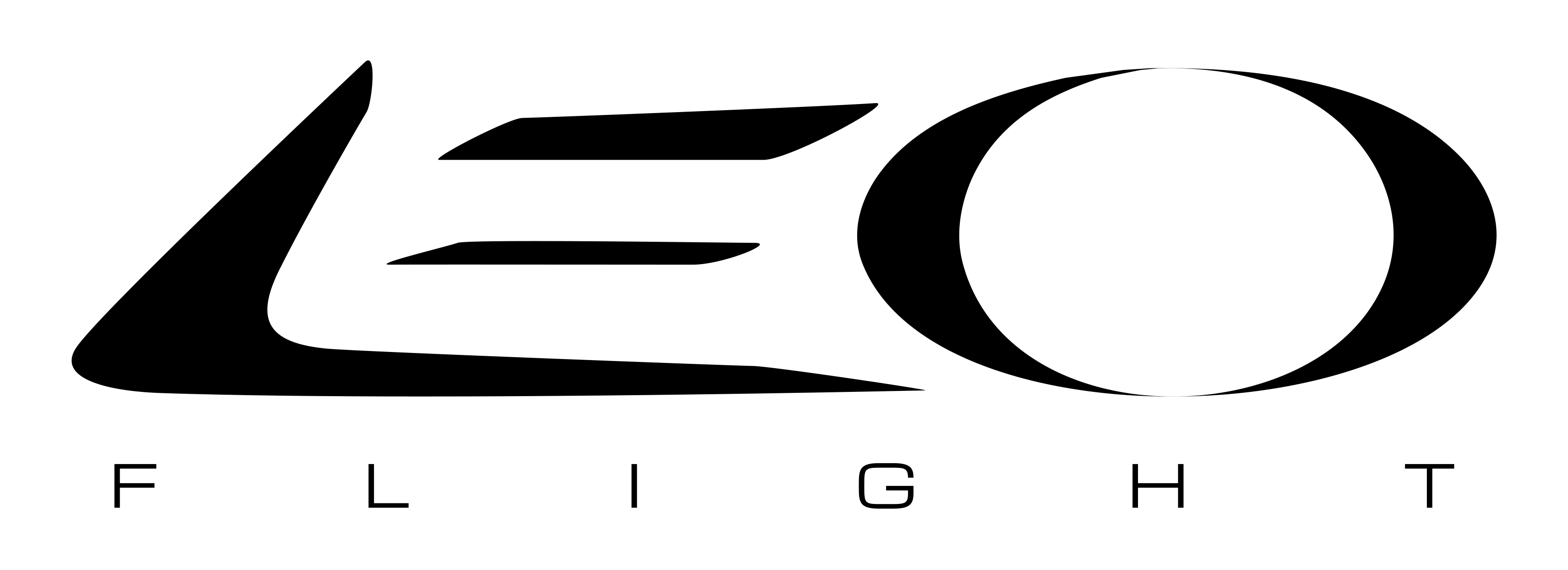
- Formerly: Urban eVTOL, LLC
- Company type: Private
- Industry: Aviation, eVTOL
- Founded: 2021; 5 years ago
- Founders: Pete Bitar; Carlos Salaff
- Headquarters: Pendleton, Indiana, United States
- Products: LEO Coupe; LEO JetBike
- Website: leoflight.com

LEO Flight Corporation (formerly Urban eVTOL, LLC) is an American electric vertical takeoff and landing (eVTOL) company based in Pendleton, Indiana. Founded in 2021 by Pete Bitar and Carlos Salaff, the company develops personal flying vehicles using an electric jet propulsion system. Its products include the LEO Coupe and LEO JetBike.

== History ==
LEO Flight was founded as Urban eVTOL in 2021 by Pete Bitar and Carlos Salaff as a joint venture between Bitar's company Electric Jet Aircraft and Salaff's firm SALAFF Automotive. In July that year, the company won a NASA HeroX award for its aerial mobility design as part of NASA's Convergent Aeronautics Solutions program. It also announced its first vehicle, the LEO Coupe, the same year.

In June 2022, the company (now operating as LEO Flight) presented the LX-1, a crewed alpha prototype for the LEO Coupe. The prototype was an aluminum frame built to test the propulsion system, with 72 vertical-lift fans in four banks and two rear fans for horizontal thrust. LEO Flight exhibited the coupe at CES 2024. At CES 2025, it presented its LEO Solo vehicle in a virtual reality presentation, with support from the Indiana Economic Development Corporation.

In January 2026, LEO Flight introduced the LEO JetBike at CES 2026, pre-orders of which had opened in November 2025.

== Vehicles ==
LEO Flight LX1-R Test Flight in Indiana (2025)

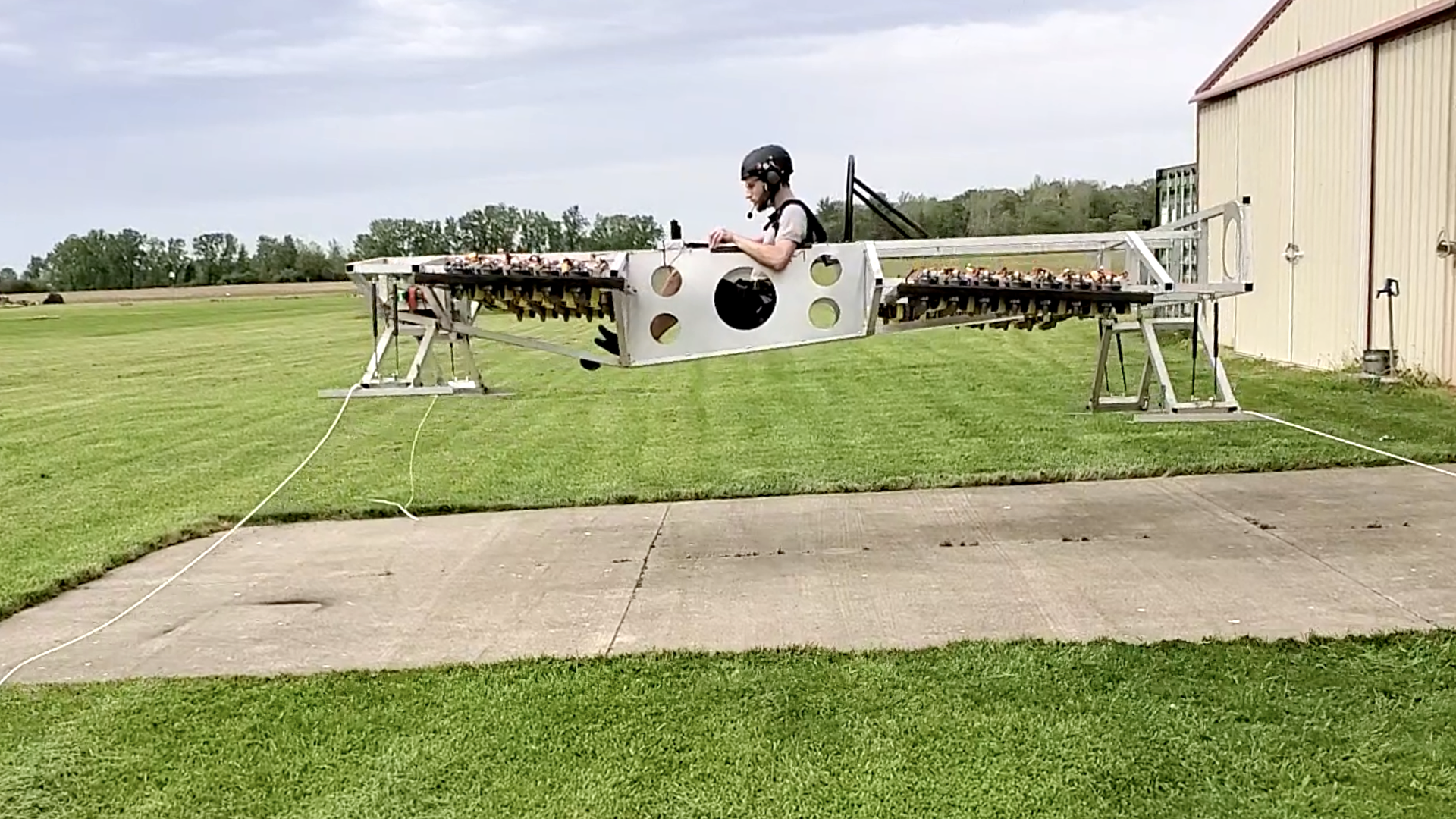
LEO Flight LX-1 Tethered Hover Testing in Indiana

LEO Flight develops electric vertical takeoff and landing vehicles using ducted electric jet propulsion rather than exposed propellers. As of 2026, it has two vehicles in development: the LEO Coupe and LEO JetBike.

=== LEO Coupe ===
The LEO Coupe is a multi-passenger eVTOL designed to resemble a sports car. It uses a double box-wing configuration and is powered by approximately 200 clustered electric lift jets for vertical flight, with six horizontal thrusters at the rear for forward flight. The vehicle measures 20 feet by 10 feet, which the company says allows it to fit in a standard two-car garage. The exterior is carbon fiber, with wraparound windows, gull-wing doors, and a semi-autonomous fly-by-wire control system.

LEO Flight has stated a target cruise speed of 200 mph and a range of approximately 250 miles including reserves. The company plans to certify the vehicle under the FAA's MOSAIC framework for light sport aircraft.

=== LEO JetBike ===
The LEO JetBike is a motorcycle-style personal eVTOL that uses ducted electric jet propulsion rather than exposed propellers. Like the Solo, it is designed to operate under FAA Part 103 ultralight rules. The JetBike has a listed top speed of approximately 60 mph and a flight time of 10 to 15 minutes, with altitude electronically limited to about 15 feet. It is priced at $99,900, with deliveries expected to begin in the fourth quarter of 2026.

== Specifications ==
=== LEO Coupe ===
Data from From the manufacturer

General characteristics

- Crew: 1
- Capacity: 2 passengers; 510 lb payload
- Length: 20 ft 0 in (6.10 m)
- Wingspan: 10 ft 0 in (3.05 m)
- Height: 4 ft 7 in (1.40 m)
- Semi-autonomous fly-by-wire control system, EV-standard home and fast charging, FAA expanded light-sport certification; approximately 20 hours flight time required

Performance

- Cruise speed: 200 mph (320 km/h, 170 kn)
- Range: 250 mi (400 km, 220 nmi)

=== LEO JetBike ===
Data from From the manufacturer

General characteristics

- Crew: 1
- Length: 6.5 ft 0 in (1.98 m)
- Wingspan: 6.5 ft 0 in (1.98 m)
- FAA Part 103 ultralight, no pilot's license required

Performance

- Maximum speed: 60 mph (97 km/h, 52 kn)
- Endurance: 10–15 minutes
- Altitude electronically limited to approximately 15 ft, Noise level approximately 80 dB
