= Jetson One =

Electric ultralight

Jetson ONE
- Type: eVTOL ultralight
- Inventor: Tomasz Patan
- Inception: 2017
- Manufacturer: Jetson
- Available: Available
- Website: jetson.com

The Jetson ONE is a concept type of personal ultralight known as an eVTOL. It is a 102-horsepower battery-operated ultralight with eight electric motors. A Swedish startup company, Jetson, produces the personal ultralight, which is manufactured and tested in Arezzo, Italy. To fly the single-seat ultralight, the operator does not need a pilot licence or special training in the US. It is equipped with a parachute.

== Background ==
Late 2017, Tomasz Patan built a working "proof of concept" of an electric VTOL personal flying vehicle with the goal of "making everyone a pilot." In 2018, Patan designed a personal flying car. The design was improved, and in 2021, Patan invented a new model called the Jetson ONE eVTOL. In 2022, the company offered the Jetson Ones for US$92,000 each. In 2022, the company began manufacturing the Jetson One in Poland.

In 2022, the company moved production and testing of the Jetson ONE from Poland to a facility in Arezzo, Italy. The company's CEO is Stephan D'haene, and he announced that the company obtained approval from the Italian Civil Aviation Authority (ENAC) to fly the aircraft in Italy's uncontrolled airspace. In 2023, the company announced that it had raised US$15 million to fund the project. They planned to begin delivering the next Jetson ONEs in 2024.

== Specifications ==
The ultralight will be powered by high-discharge lithium-ion batteries and eight electric motors generating 102 horsepower. Battery-powered flight time is limited to 20 minutes with a top speed of 63 mph (101 km/h). The vehicle has a charger which can recharge in one hour at 230/240 V or two hours with 120 V power. Batteries may be removed and changed to avoid waiting for charging. The person piloting the ultralight must be less than 210 lb (95 kg). The individual motors powering the ultralight resemble drones. The ultralight can fly at 1,500 ft (460 m). It weighs 190 lb (86 kg), and the fuselage is built of aluminium and a carbon-Kevlar composite. It is being offered for US$148,000.

The ultralight is capable of flight even if one of the engines fails. It is equipped with lidar sensors to avoid obstacles. There is a rapid-deploying ballistic parachute, and the ultralight has a mode which allows the craft to hover without operating the controls. Joysticks control it, and it has a throttle lever to adjust power. The left controller operates the ultralight's altitude, and the right controls the direction. The single-seat ultralight is considered a recreation vehicle, and it is not considered an aircraft by the US Federal Aviation Administration, so it does not require the operator to have a pilot licence or special training.

== Reception ==
Jetson posted a video to YouTube, received 48 million views, and was featured on The Late Show with Stephen Colbert. The company attracted investors, including musical artists Will.i.am and Rikard Steiber. In October 2023, the American business magazine Forbes announced, "Flying Cars Are Here, And You Can Buy This One For Less Than $100,000".

== See also ==
- List of single seat helicopters
