= PteroDynamics =

American aerospace company

PteroDynamics is an aerospace company based in Colorado, United States. The company targets passenger and air cargo for commercial and military applications, including air taxi, agriculture, aerial inspections, and medevac.

== History ==
Dr. Val Petrov founded PteroDynamics in 2017.

In August 2021 the US Naval Air Warfare Center Aircraft Division (NAWCAD) contracted with the company to supply Transwing drones for the Blue Water Maritime Logistics UAS (BWUAS) program. In September 2022, NAWCAD announced that it had taken delivery of its first uncrewed PteroDynamics XP-4 Transwing.

In February 2023, the company completed a $7.5 million seed round funded by Kairos Ventures, Lavrock Ventures and CS Venture Opportunities Fund. In October, the company demonstrated the autonomous landing and take off of its Transwing cargo drone from USNS Burlington.

In October 2024, it was reported that the company was forming a network of distributors for its Transwing autonomous VTOL utility aircraft.

In December 2024, Babcock was announced to have partnered with the company on developing tactical unmanned aerial systems in New Zealand and Australia.

== Transwing ==
The Transwing is an aircraft claimed to be capable of electric vertical takeoff and landing (eVTOL) flight for advanced air mobility (AAM) applications. The PteroDynamics passenger concept design is optionally battery- or hybrid-powered.

The name refers to a wing that folds/unfolds during flight supporting both vertical and efficient, long-range flight.

The company plan is to offer the aircraft in multiple sizes, with empty weight 3-75k pounds, with wing sizes from 4–34 feet.

=== Specifications ===
Company-supplied specifications:

- Aircraft type: Long range VTOL
- Piloting: 1 pilot
- Capacity: Varies
- Empty weight: 3 pounds (1.4 kg) and 75,000 pounds (34,000 kg)
- Propellers: 4 or 6 propellers
- Electric motors: 4 or 6 electric motors
- Power source: Batteries or combined battery/av gas
- Fuselage: Carbon fiber composite
- Window: Canopy over cockpit
- Wings: Scalable from 4 feet (1.2 m) to 34 feet (10 m)
- Tail: 1 inverted angled vertical stabilizer
- Landing gear: Retractable wheeled landing gear
- Safety: multiple propellers (or ducted fans) and motors that allow safe landing when not all motors function. Redundant critical sub-system components.
