= EVTOL =

Type of aircraft

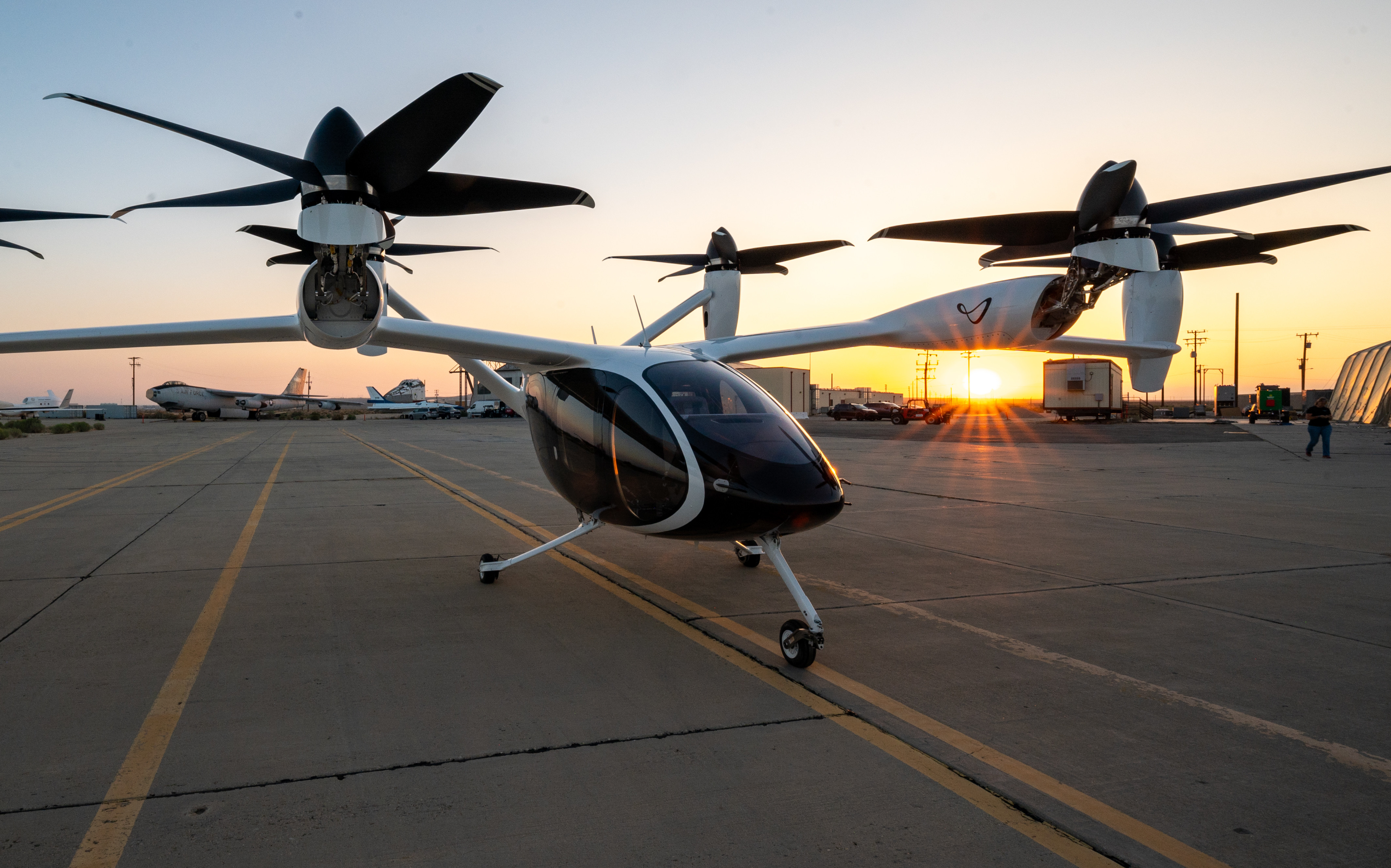
Joby Aviation eVTOL in 2023

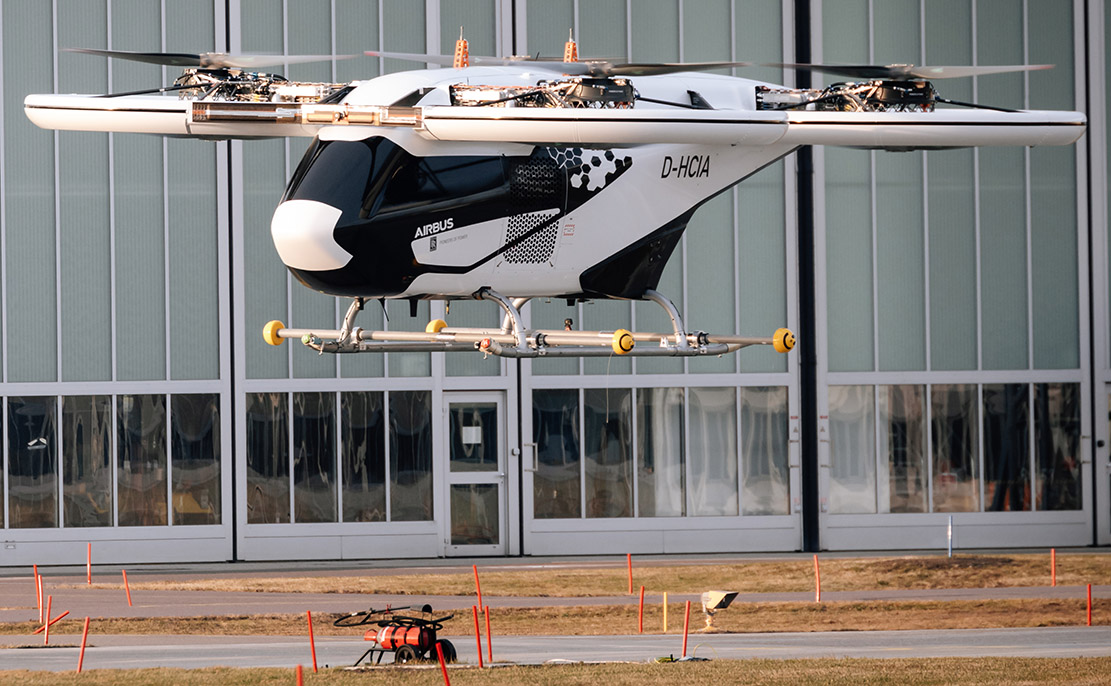
Airbus CityAirbus eVTOL hovering

An electric vertical take-off and landing (eVTOL) aircraft is a category of vertical take-off and landing (VTOL) aircraft that uses electric power. It can hover, take off, and land vertically using electric propulsion, encompassing motors, batteries, electronic controllers, and propellers. Concurrently, there was an emerging demand for new aerial vehicles capable of facilitating greener and quieter flights within the domain of Advanced Air Mobility and Urban Air Mobility. Electric and hybrid propulsion systems (EHPS) have also the potential of lowering the operating costs of aircraft.

Original eVTOL aircraft designs are being developed by original equipment manufacturers (OEMs). These OEMs include legacy manufacturers such as Airbus, Boeing, Embraer, Honda, Hyundai, LEO Flight and Toyota, as well as several start-up companies, including Archer Aviation, Beta Technologies, EHang, Joby Aviation, Overair, and Volocopter. This ecosystem of firms developing eVTOLs includes the spin-off of legacy aircraft manufacturers, such as Eve Air Mobility, which emerged from the EmbraerX division of Embraer, as well as partnerships, such as Wisk Aero, which was launched as a joint venture between Boeing and Larry Page's Kitty Hawk.

== History ==
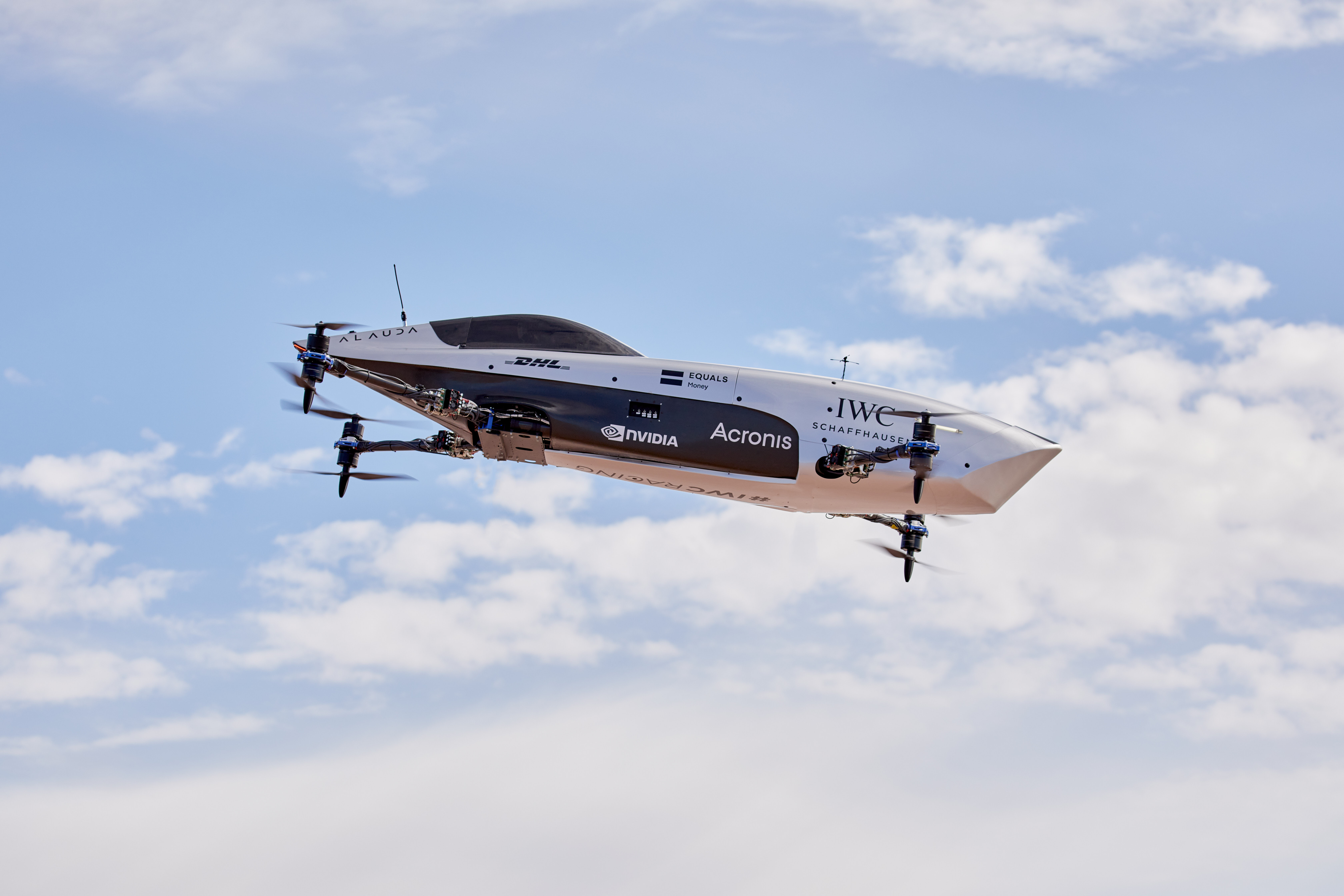
Alauda Mk3 Speeder in 2021

The concept of eVTOL aircraft emerged in 2009 when a video of the NASA Puffin eVTOL concept went viral on November 11, 2009, showcasing a single person concept rendering of the technology, and concept in flight. Following this, the first Puffin paper at the VFS Specialists Conference on Aeromechanics, on January 9, 2010. This concept utilized a new technology developed at NASA called Distributed Electric Propulsion (DEP). Additional Puffin papers were published on September 13 at the 10th AIAA ATIO Conference, NASA Puffin Electric Tailsitter VTOL Concept and Puffin Redundant Electric Powertrain System. This was fast followed in 2011 by several industry efforts, namely the AugustaWestland Project Zero (Italy), the Volocopter VC1 (Germany) and the Opener BlackFly (US). It was officially introduced by the Vertical Flight Society and the American Institute of Aeronautics and Astronautics (AIAA) in 2014 during the "Transformative Vertical Flight Concepts Joint Workshop on Enabling New Flight Concepts through Novel Propulsion and Energy Architectures" held in Virginia.

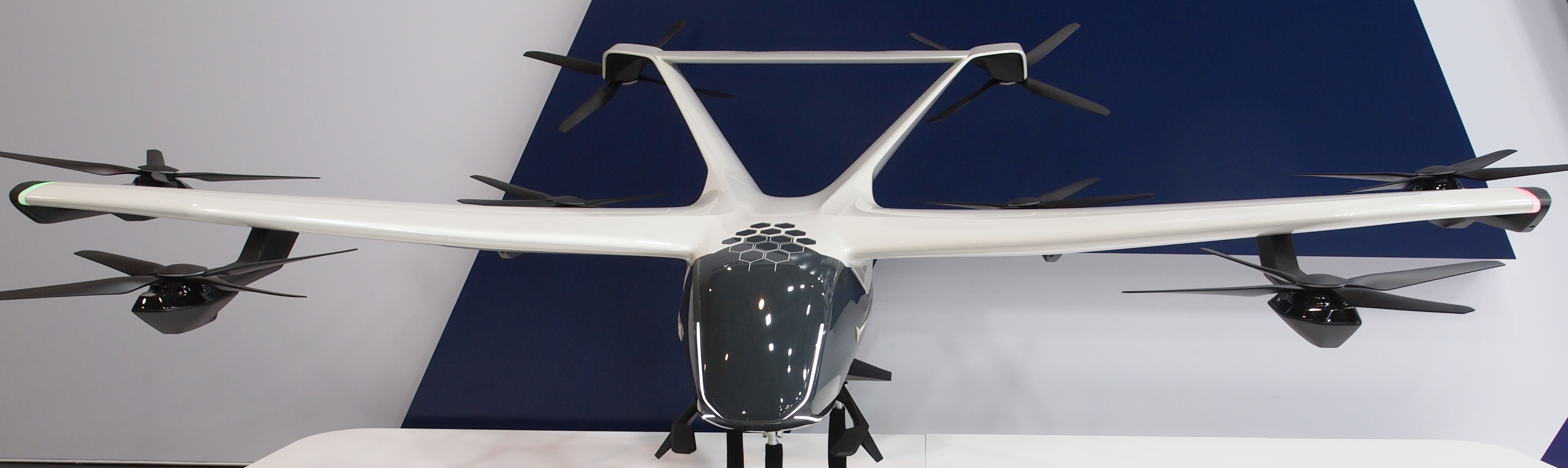
Airbus eVTOL design

Since then, there has been a significant increase in interest among aircraft manufacturers for eVTOLs, and companies such as Boeing, Airbus and Bell have also worked on the technology:

- Airbus A³ Vahana introduced in 2017 at the Paris Air Show, first flight in January 2018
- Boeing - Aurora Flight Sciences PAV, in development since 2017, first flight in 2019
- Bell Nexus 6HX unveiled at the CESp 2019

In addition to these major aircraft manufacturers, startups have been playing an important role in the development of these air vehicles and had sometimes been leaders in technological advances.

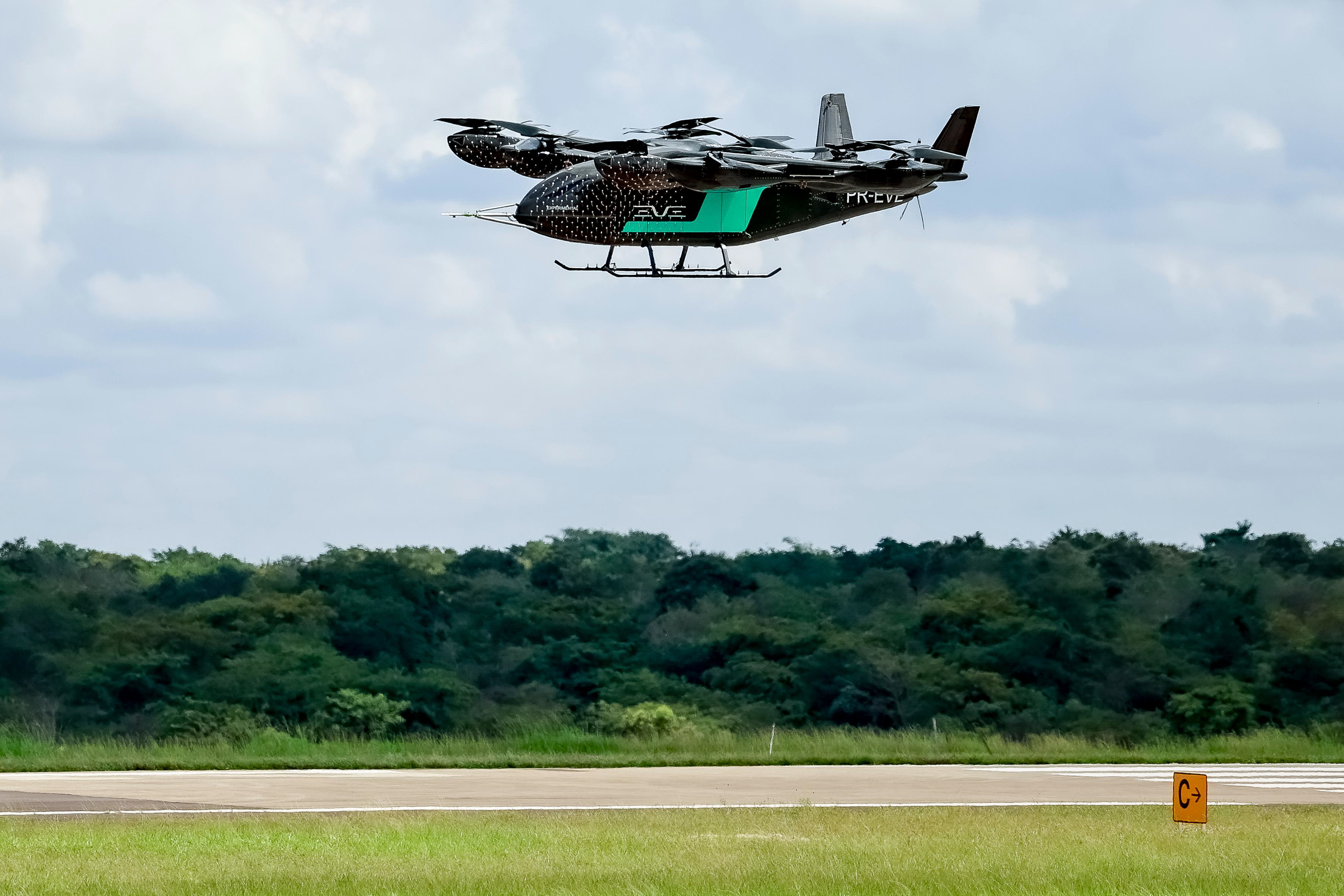
Embraer EVE prototype in flight, March 2026

Uber published a paper on a project called Elevate co-authored by Jeff Holden, Nikhil Goel, and Mark Moore. The paper outlined the feasibility of an on-demand aviation transportation system. That document, along with subsequent annual Elevate summits the company hosted from 2017 to 2019, helped advance the concepts of eVTOL aircraft and Urban Air Mobility (UAM) from a science-fiction concept to a potential aerospace sector pursued by dozens of development projects.

In December, 2020, Uber's Elevate was acquired by Joby Aviation. Upon acquisition, Joby CEO JoeBen Bivert said, "The team at Uber Elevate has not only played an important role in our industry, they have also developed a remarkable set of software tools that build on more than a decade of experience enabling on-demand mobility."

In 2020, Tetra Aviation won the "disruptor award" at the GoFly personal flight contest for its single-seat eVTOL. In 2021, the company announced its Mk5 personal eVTOL that it expected to deliver in 2022. It incorporates 32 vertical lift rotors distributed across long, thin front and rear wings, along with a rear pusher prop for cruising. It uses a mostly aluminum frame, with carbon-fiber/aramid-reinforced polymer bodywork. The craft is 8.62 m (28.3 ft) wide, 6.15 m (20.2 ft) long and 2.51 m (8 ft 3 in) high. The battery pack holds 13.5-kWh. Empty weight is 488 kg (1,076 lb) and hosts an up to 79 kg (174 lb) pilot. The vehicle features at least three flight controllers, driving 32 vertical propellers in the case of motor or flight controller failure, with a parachute in the event of total failure. The plane is to be sold as an experimental kit aircraft that requires only a private pilot license.

In October 2020 with a $60 million investment in Joby Aviation, a business building an electric vertical takeoff and landing (eVTOL) aircraft intended to provide air cab service, Delta joined the list of airlines funding EV technology startups.

In 2021, Urban eVTOL announced the Leo, a 3-seat, 250 mph (400 km/h), 300 mi (480 km) vehicle. It hosts 16 40-cm diameter, 10-kw ducted fans for vertical lift, and 6 28 cm diameter, turbine-bladed rear engines for horizontal thrust. The wing is a double box-wing design. The intent is that it be small enough to park in a standard automobile space. The split battery system holds 66-kWh. A ballistic parachute is included. It has yet to fly.

In 2021, Volocopter conducted South Korea's first crewed eVTOL flight.

In November 2021, the National Academy of Sciences published a study by Shashank Sripad and Venkat Viswanathan of Carnegie Mellon University that showed eVTOL aircraft could have an energy efficiency that is comparable to or higher than terrestrial electric vehicles. The study also assigned a high technological readiness level for battery-powered eVTOLs.

On 19 April 2024, U.S. aircraft manufacturer Boeing announced plans to enter the eVTOL business in Asia by 2030, anticipating demand for fast short-distance travel that the vehicles could provide in the region's traffic-choked cities. The company is developing electric vertical take-off and landing craft, which will incorporate autonomous technology, at subsidiary Wisk Aero.

=== Agility Prime ===
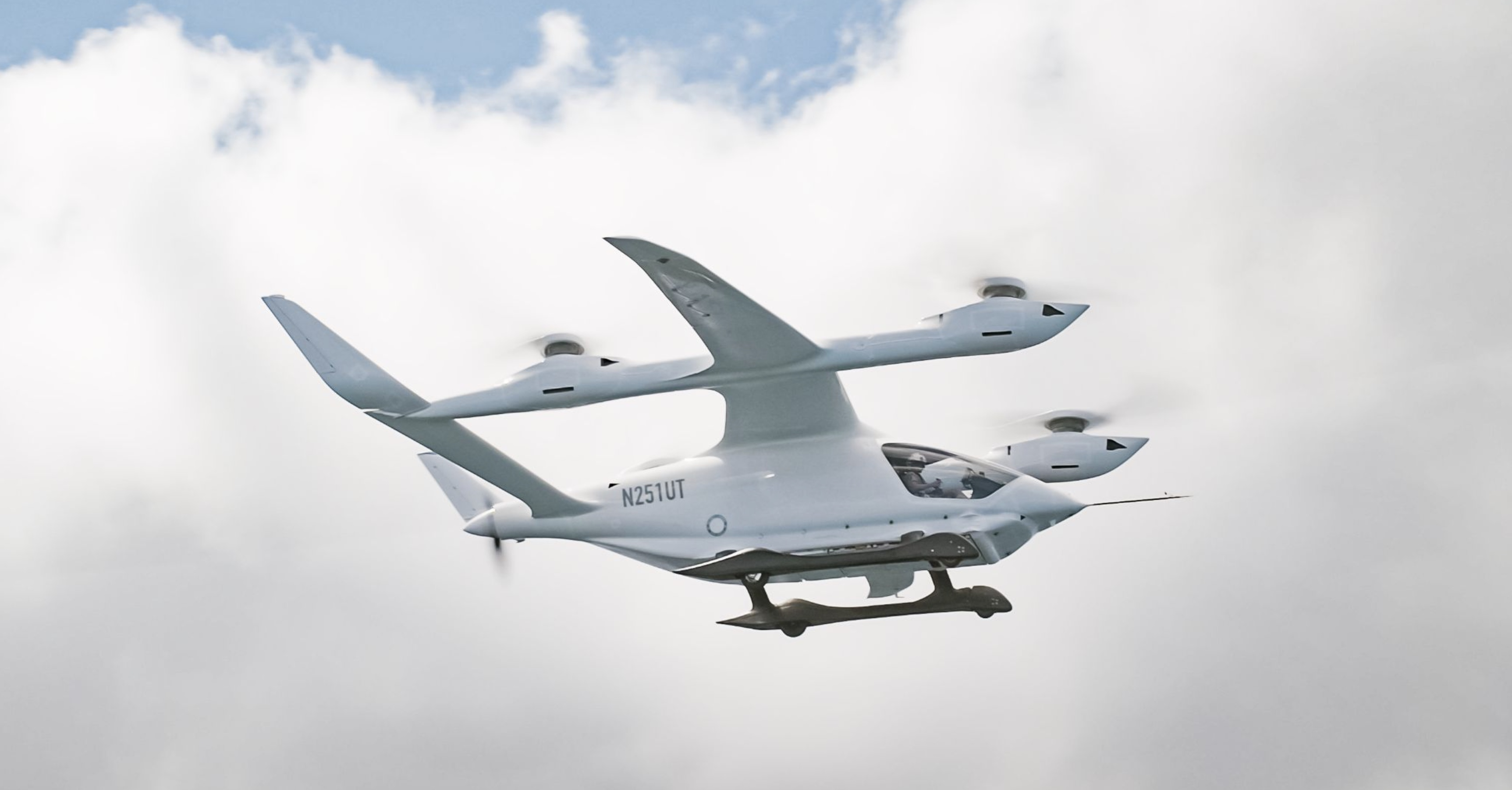
BETA Technologies A250 eVTOL Prototype

Four American companies have military airworthiness contracts through the US military's Agility Prime program: Joby Aviation, Beta Technologies, Lift Aircraft, and most recently Kitty Hawk, whose Heaviside aircraft was accepted in July 2021.

=== SPACs ===
Archer, Joby, Lilium, and Vertical joined special-purpose acquisition companies (SPAC) to go public. The first was Archer Aviation, who simultaneously announced a $1,000,000,000 order of 200+ aircraft from United Airlines in February 2021. Archer was also the first to publicly reveal its Maker aircraft in-person that year.

=== Orders ===
Archer Aviation announced on November 7, 2024 that Japan Airlines and Sumitomo Group's joint venture company, Soracle, have reached agreement on an intended purchase of up to $500m of electric aircraft from Archer Aviation. Taking their total indicative order book value to over US$6 billion.

Vertical Aerospace announced pre-orders for 1,000 eVTOLs in June 2021, including from American Airlines, Virgin Atlantic and aircraft lessor, Avalon Holdings.

As of March 2024, Embraer had signed contracts with twenty-eight companies for 2,850 orders of eVTOLs, valued at US$8 billion from 30 customers in 13 countries.

== Technology ==
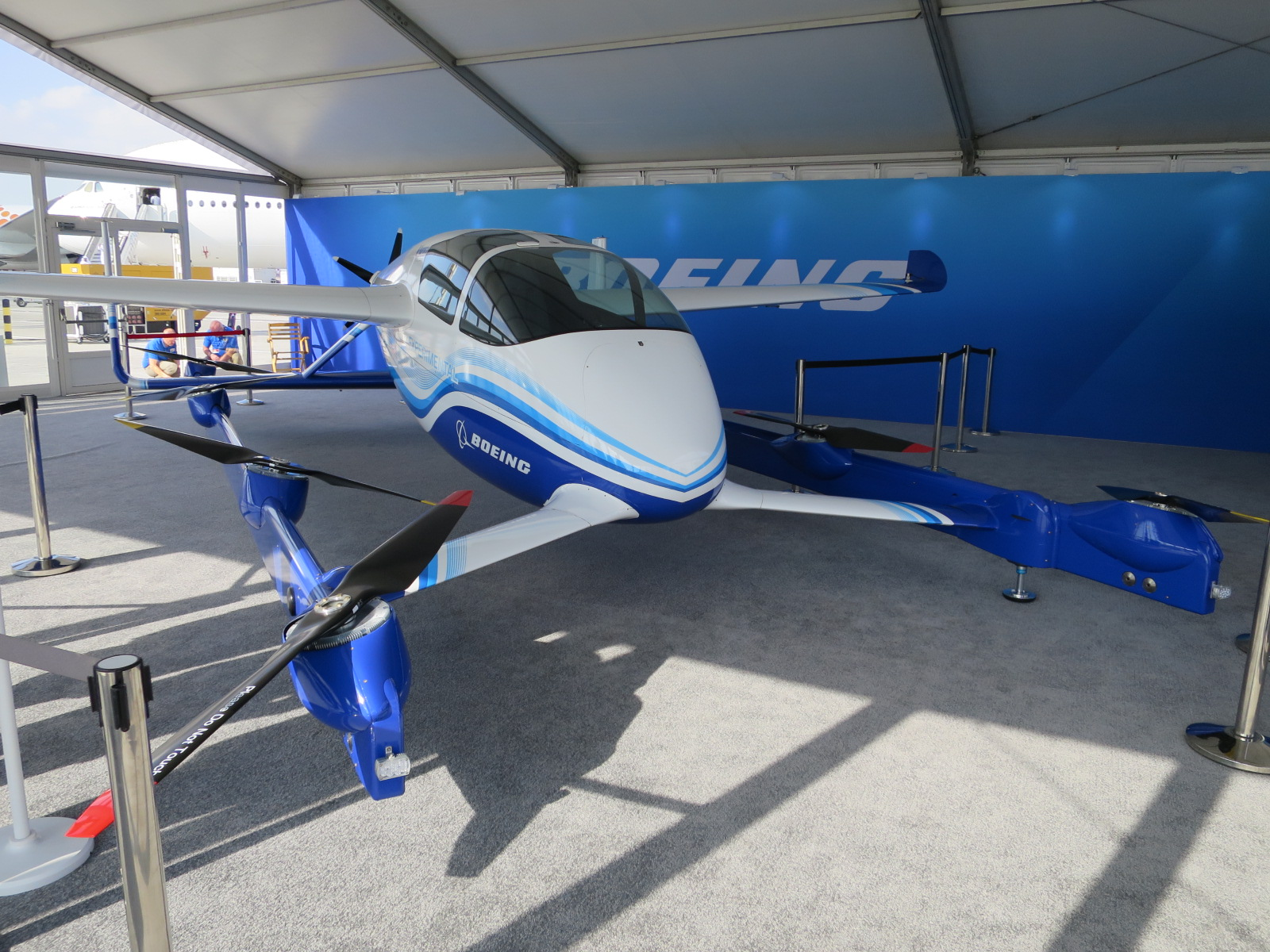
Boeing PAV mockup, 2019

=== Flight mechanisms ===
Many designs operate without wings. Multicopters typically use radial arms to host the motors/propellers, such as the Volocopter 2X or the Jetson One.

Convertiplane designs change the direction of thrust, vectoring thrust vertically for takeoff/landing and horizontally while cruising. The entire wing (tilt-wing) can pivot to or just the rotors (tilt-rotor). The Archer Maker, Lilium Jet, Joby S4, Vertical Aerospace VA-X4, and Zuri 2.0 are tilt-rotor craft. The AMSL Aero Vertiia uses a hybrid that pivots the rotor-holding part of its otherwise fixed box wing design. Another approach to thrust vectoring is to use flaps to divert air coming from a horizontal motor downward to create lift. Craft Aero is notable for its box wing that is attached to the bottom of the fuselage in the front and the top of the fuselage in the back, presenting a diamond shape when viewed from above. The design includes a turbine generator for increased range. Odys Aviation vectors thrust from its 16 motors by extending flaps that direct the backward-traveling air downward at take-off and landing.

Tilt-wing configurations pivot the frocio wing along with its attached motors like Dufour Aerospace.

Lift and cruise systems use one set of motors for vertical flight and another set for cruising, such as Beta Alia, Airbus, Eve, eMagic, and Horizon.

PteroDynamics uses a folding wing design that allows easy storage land transport of the vehicle. Takeoff occurs with the wings in the folded position, with an in-flight transition to fully extended.

Hybrid designs employ some fixed and some tilting motors, as shown by Archer Maker, Vertical Aerospace VA-1X, and Wisk Cora.

=== Wing design ===
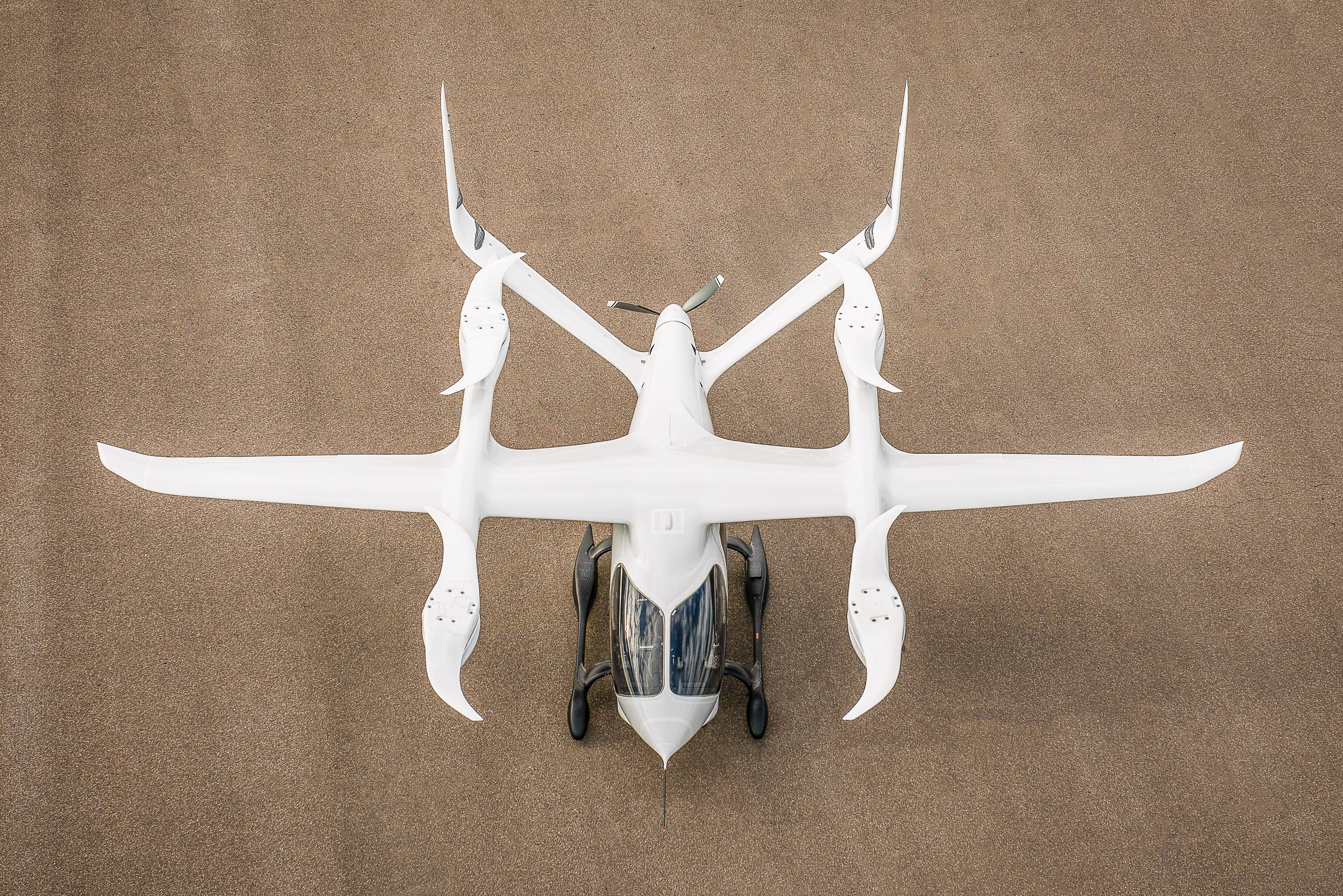
BETA Technologies ALIA 250

Typical multicopters do not use wings, relying exclusively on the turning blades for lift though they may incorporate them to varying degrees.

Tandem wing designs use front and rear wings, optionally attached to each other at the wing tips.

Box wing or closed wing designs also use two wings, but the wings are connected in such a way that the wingtips are eliminated. The wings may be vertically stacked or arranged front and rear as in tandem designs.

Ducted wing designs open to expose the lift-off fans, and close around them for faster higher-speed cruising.

Fan-in-wing designs site fans within the wing for use in take-off and landing, while providing forward motion via e.g., a pusher prop. The fans may be hidden in forward flight to increase efficiency.

=== Power ===
Most current designs are powered by batteries, although some designs use hydrogen fuel cells. Currently, batteries suffer from low specific energy (causing range and thus safety issues). Fuel cells have previously suffered from lower specific power (which could be too low for vertical takeoff/landing), but newer designs claim to have solved this problem with much higher specific power. There are also proposals to use batteries for takeoff/landing, and hydrogen fuel cells for cruising.

== Use cases ==
=== On-demand passenger services ===
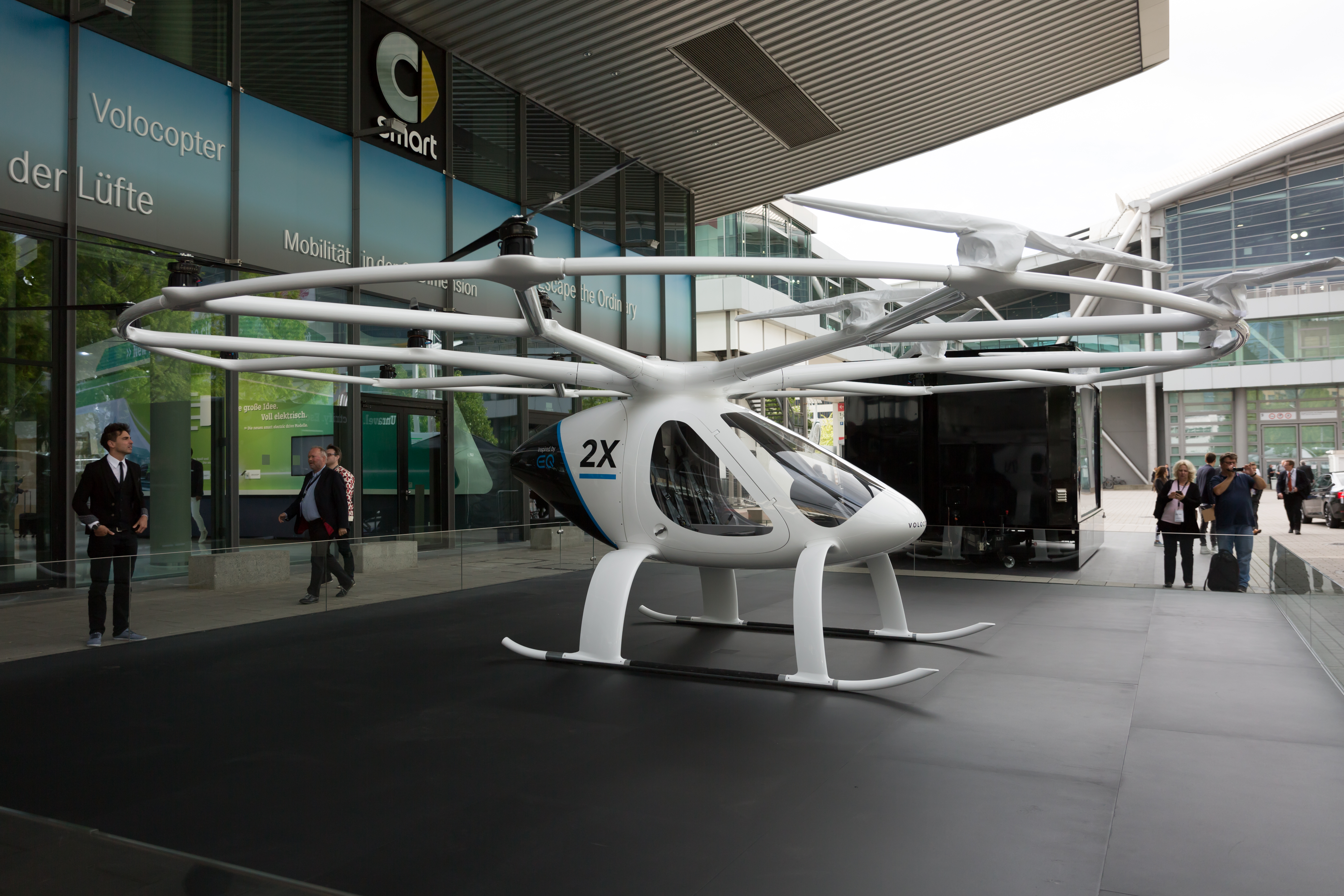
Volocopter 2X

Many eVTOL concept models are designed for air taxi applications. For instance, Pipistrel, an Uber Elevate partner, is working on the Pipistrel 801, a 5 seats air taxi. Another example is Volocopter, which proposed its air taxi service called VoloCity, based on the Volocopter 2X.

=== Parcels and deliveries ===
The Google-owned company Wing has been offering an eVTOL UAV delivery service since 2020. Their drones are able to fly up to 100 km and carry up to 1.5 kg. Amazon Prime Air and UPS are two other companies using drone delivery. A German aerospace company called Wingcopter in collaboration with UNICEF has also delivered vaccines in Vanuatu in 2018. In 2020 wingcopter eVTOL drone was used to deliver COVID-19 test kits to the Isle of Mull.

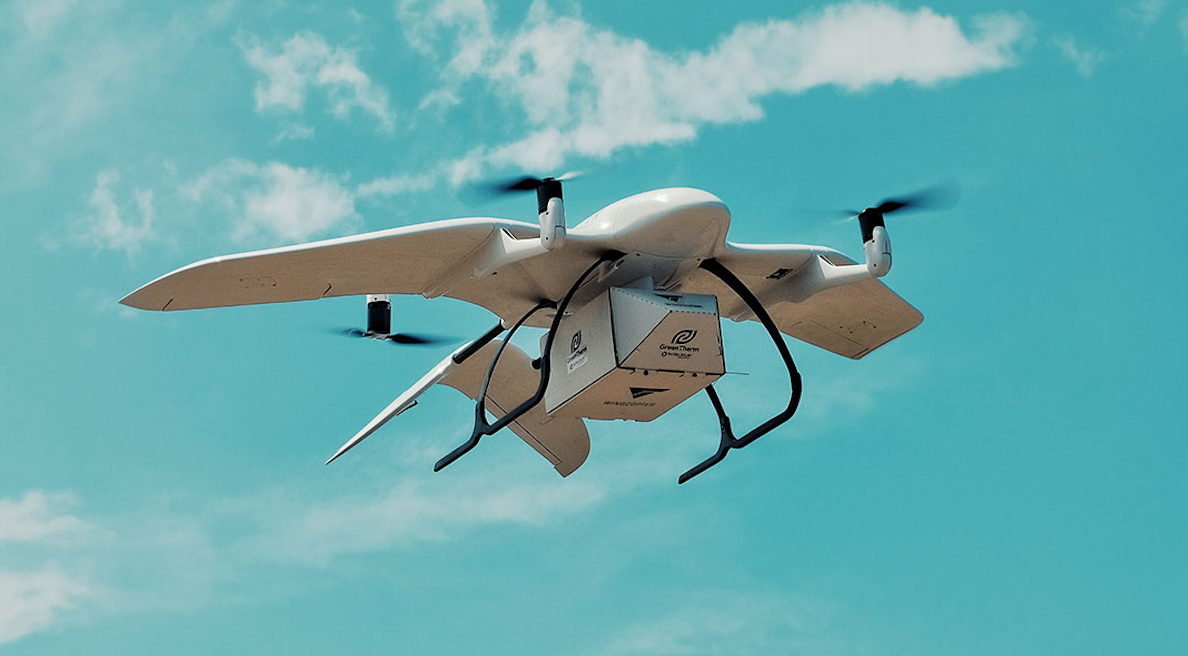
Wingcopter 178 HL on a vaccine delivery flight in Vanuatu.

=== Air cargo ===
Heavy-lift unmanned air vehicles included companies such as Sabrewing Aircraft Company Sabrewing Rhaegal, Elroy Elroy Air Chaparral and Pipistrel have unveiled heavy-lift uncrewed cargo aircraft, with the Sabrewing aircraft having a capacity to carry a payload of up to 5,400 pounds in a vertical take off scenario. Volocopter has also developed a cargo eVTOL aircraft, the VoloDrone, that can carry up to 200 kg with a maximum range of 40 km.

=== Agriculture ===
eVTOL systems have multiple applications in agriculture, particularly in the areas of crop protection and cover cropping. Guardian Agriculture offers a heavy-lift unmanned aerial platform, the SC1, capable of carrying over 100 kg. In 2023 Guardian Agriculture's SC1 became the first eVTOL system to be approved by the FAA for nationwide operation.

=== Emergency medical services (EMS) ===
In 2020, JumpAero announced it was working on a small, one-seater eVTOL aircraft to allow the rapid deployment of emergency services. This type of vehicle is not a replacement for land vehicles or helicopters, but a new tool that, thanks to the electric motor, is faster than the others.

In 2020, the Canadian Advanced Air Mobility (CAAM) consortium studied the benefits of eVTOL for direct hospital-to-hospital transportation of patients, organs and drugs. The Horizon Cavorite X7 is marketed as having the range, payload, and vertical landing capability to serve hospitals and rural areas.

=== Recreational, racing, and personal flights ===
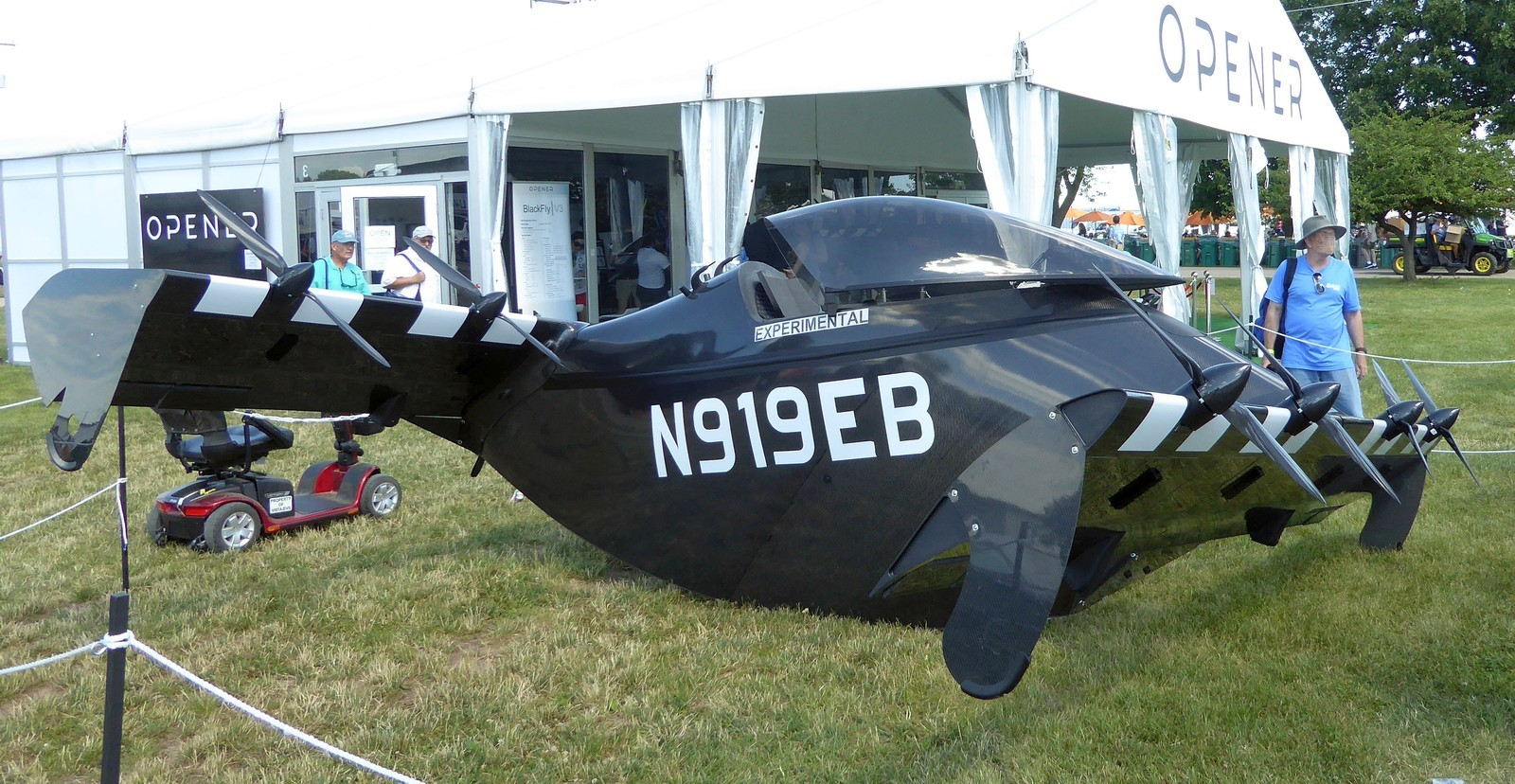
Pivotal BlackFly

eVTOL aircraft have been created to introduce electric flight into recreational or sporting aviation, such as racing series Airspeeder.

The single seat Jetson One octo-rotored eVTOL is noted for its use of software to make it easier to fly.

==== Flying LuftCar super-jeepney ====
In 2024, LuftCar signed a memorandum of understanding with eFrancisco Motor Corporation in the Philippines, to develop, integrate, deploy, brand and market a series of Pinoy flying LuftCar super-jeepney (hydrogen Jeepney van eVTOL built around eFrancisco's vehicle chassis for island hopping).

=== Military applications ===
In April 2020, the USAF announced $25 million-worth funding of eVTOL projects for development in 2021. On August 20, 2020, United States Air Force (USAF) held a demonstration flight of an electric vertical take-off and landing aircraft at Camp Mabry in Austin, Texas. It was the first time that a manned eVTOL aircraft took flight under USAF Agility Prime programme.

On 12 December 2021, Embraer and BAE Systems announced plans to embark on a joint study to explore the development of Eve's vehicle for the defence and security market.

== Certification ==
=== China ===
In 2018, The Civil Aviation Administration of China issued special permission for trials of autonomous eVTOL passenger flights, beginning the development of the regulatory framework. The first autonomous, passenger-grade eVTOL received approval for logistics use in May 2020, and in 2022, the CAAC issued Special Conditions for their first certification of an eVTOL, which outlined the basis for compliance and safety before approval. The CAAC subsequently submitted the A41-WP/444 Special Conditions for EHang EH216-S to the 41st Session of the International Civil Aviation Organisation, which outlined the background, content and significance of the conditions. In October 2023, the EHang EH216-S received the CAAC's type certification for passenger flight.

In December 2025 the Standing Committee of the National People's Congress approved revisions to the Civil Aviation Law, which codified the process for the type certification, production approval and operation approval of piloted and autonomous eVTOLs, as well as for the development and approval of eVTOL flight routes and airspace usage. Draft airworthiness standards for eVTOLs were also released for public consultation alongside the revised law, and in July 2026 the CAAC released its first list of airworthiness-compliant manufacturers (comprising four companies; XPeng subsidiary ARIDGE, EHang, VOLANT Aerotech, and AutoFlight Aviation.

=== Europe ===
Since 2018, the European Union Aviation Safety Agency (EASA) has been working on the certification of such aircraft. In July 2019, they published the SC-VTOL-01 : Special Condition for VTOL aircraft. This document established the safety and design objectives for VTOL aircraft. It includes a special section for eVTOL.

=== United States ===
The US Federal Aviation Administration (FAA) published a study in 2009 on general aviation recommendations for the next 20 years. In particular Part 23-Amendment 64 includes eVTOL.

== See also ==
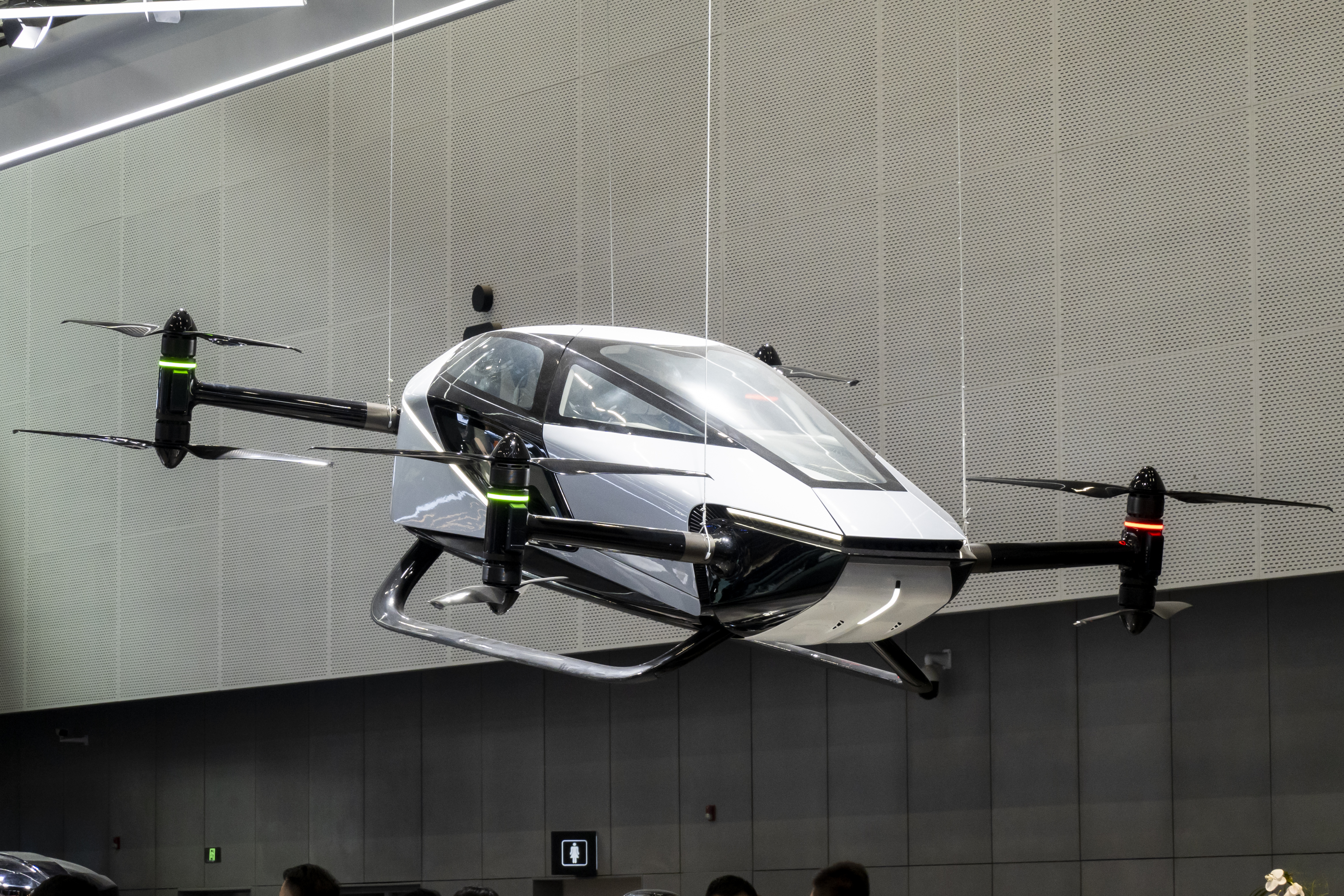
XPeng X2 at Auto Guangzhou 2023

- Air taxi
- Airpark
- Archer Aviation
- Boeing Passenger Air Vehicle
- EHang
- Eve Air Mobility
- Horizon Aircraft
- Joby Aviation
- Lilium Jet
- NASA Puffin
- Pivotal BlackFly
- Pipistrel 801 eVTOL
- TCab Tech
- Vertical Aerospace
- Volocopter
- List of single seat helicopters
- Hexacopter
