= NASA Puffin =

Single person aircraft

Puffin
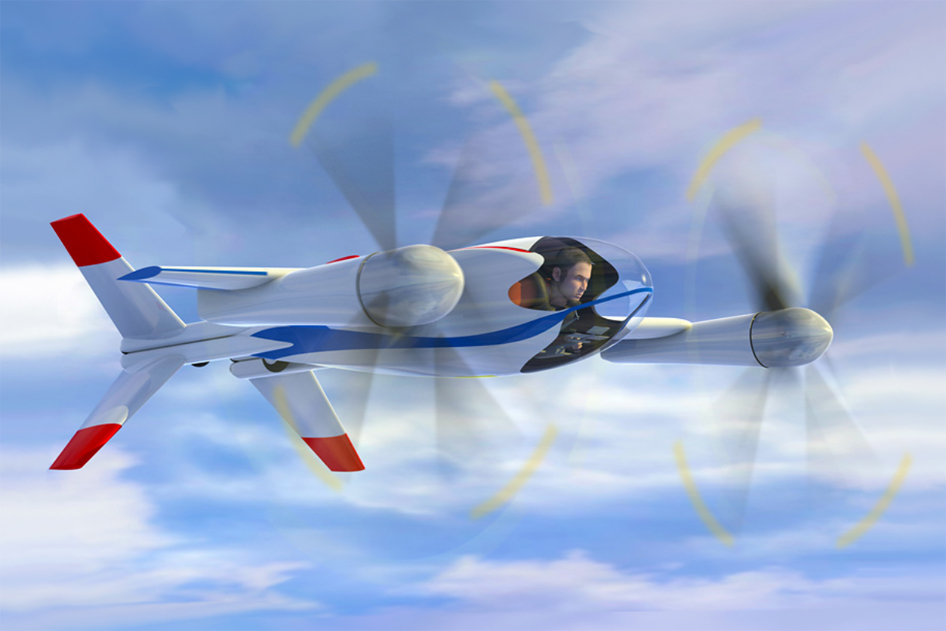
- Puffin

General information
- Type: Personal electric aircraft
- National origin: United States
- Status: One-third scale model built, not flown
- Number built: 0

The NASA Puffin is a concept for a single person, electrically powered vertical takeoff and landing (eVTOL) aircraft designed by engineers from NASA, MIT, Georgia Tech, and other research institutions. First introduced in 2009, Puffin was a critical project to test the feasibility and capabilities of electric propulsion. The design features a lightweight carbon-fiber frame, a tiltrotor system, and a fully electric powertrain allowing it to be nearly silent. The concept design was projected to be capable of flying a single person at a cruise speed of 150 miles per hour (241 km/h), with range expected to be less than 50 miles (80 km) with 2010-vintage Lithium-iron-phosphate battery technology. The design specified a 14.5 foot (4.4196 m) wingspan, standing 12 feet (3.65 m) tall on the ground in its take-off or landing configuration.

A one-third scale model was built in 2010, and was briefly displayed including appearing in one episode of a Discovery Channel series on invention.

== Development ==
External videos
- NASA Puffin Low Noise, Electric VTOL Personal Air Vehicle on YouTube

While at NASA, Mark Moore developed the Puffin as part of his doctoral program and achieved the first flight of a one-third scale, hover-capable Puffin technology demonstrator by March 2010 as the first eVTOL (electric Vertical Takeoff and Landing) aircraft concept. By mid-summer 2010, they hoped to "begin investigating how well it transitions from cruise to hover flight". As of August 2010, the one-third scale model of the Puffin was briefly on display at the NASA Langley campus for the filming of the Discovery Channel series Dean of Invention. The Puffin simulator was also demonstrated. The Puffin was slated to appear in the eighth and final episode of the show. The aircraft was never built at full-scale nor extensively tested. The Puffin project was worked on by several research institutions. Each institution's major contributions to the Puffin are listed below.

NASA:

- Spearheaded the Puffin project and provided coordination among institutions.
- Developed the Puffin’s tail-sitter design to achieve vertical takeoff, landing, and a transition to horizontal flight.
- Contributed to the Puffin’s aerodynamics testing and evaluation.

Massachusetts Institute of Technology:

- Contributed to the analysis of the Puffin’s aerodynamic performance.
- Contributed to the analysis of the Puffin’s electric propulsion systems.

Georgia Institute of Technology:

- Contributed to the analysis of the Puffin’s aerodynamic performance.
- Conducted sub-scale testing of low tip-speed proprotors to achieve NASA’s goal of reducing noise production to one-tenth of a conventional helicopter.

National Institute of Aerospace:

- Contributed to the Puffin’s aerodynamic design through computational fluid dynamics simulations.
- Contributed to the analysis of the Puffin’s structural integrity.

M-DOT Aerospace:

- Contributed to the Puffin’s design validation.

The design was announced in November 2009, and a third-scale prototype was made and flown in February 2010. Despite never manufacturing a full-scale Puffin, this project has significantly advanced research for the one-passenger eVTOL aircraft.

== Impact on eVTOL Industry ==
The Puffin has significantly influenced the development of personal air mobility and electronic aviation. By being the first (scale) eVTOL aircraft to take flight, the Puffin demonstrated the feasibility of electric propulsion in vertical flight, paving the way for subsequent advancements in the eVTOL industry.

== Concept specifications ==
Data from NASA

General characteristics

- Crew: 1
- Capacity: 1 passenger
- Length: 12 ft 0 in (3.65 m)
- Wingspan: 14 ft 6 in (4.196 m)
- Empty weight: 300 lb (136 kg)
- Gross weight: 600 lb (272 kg)
- Max takeoff weight: 600 lb (272 kg)
- Propellers: 4 propellers-bladed

Performance

- Maximum speed: 300 mph (480 km/h, 260 kn)
- Cruise speed: 150 mph (240 km/h, 130 kn)
- Range: 50 mi (80 km, 43 nmi) expected range "no more" than this

== See also ==
- Electric aircraft
- Backpack helicopter
- Martin Jetpack
