= List of electric aircraft =

This is a list of electric aircraft, whose primary flight power is electrical.

Type	Country	Aircraft Class	Power Source	Date	Status	Notes
ACS-Itaipu Sora-E	Brazil	Fixed Wing	Battery	2015	Project abandoned	
Airbus A³ Vahana	United States	Fixed Wing	Battery	2018	Cancelled	Retired December 2019 to focus on CityAirbus development.
Airbus E-Fan	France	Fixed Wing	Battery	2014	Cancelled	Co-developed with Aero Composite Saintonge.
APEV Pouchelec	France	Fixed Wing kit	Battery	2009	Kit and plans no longer available as of 2018	Development of the Pouchel Light
Aurore MB 02 Souricette	France	Fixed Wing kit	Battery	2007	Plans widely available	
AutoGyro eCavalon	Germany	Rotorcraft	Battery	2013	Prototype	
Beta AVA	United States	eVTOL	Battery	2019	Prototype	Technology demonstrator.
Beta ALIA A250	United States	eVTOL	Battery	2024	Prototype	Testing and preparing serial production.
Beta ALIA CX300	United States	Fixed Wing	Battery	2024	Prototype	Testing and preparing serial production.
Bye Aerospace eFlyer 2	United States	Fixed Wing	Battery	2016	Project	
Cessna 172 electric	United States	Fixed Wing	Battery	2010	Demonstrator only	On 19 October 2012 Beyond Aviation announced that it had flown an electric Cessna 172 Skyhawk.
Cessna 208 eCaravan	United States	Fixed Wing	Battery	2020	Prototype	Currently undergoing testing prior to certification.
CityAirbus	Multinational	eVTOL	Battery	2019	Prototype	
Comac CE-25A	China	Fixed wing	Battery	2026	Prototype	
e-Genius	Germany	Fixed wing	Battery	2011	Prototype	
Electravia Electro Trike	France	Ultralight	Battery	2008	Prototype	
Electric Aircraft Corporation ElectraFlyer Trike	United States	Ultralight	Battery	2007	Unknown	Ultralight. First commercial offering of an electric aircraft.
Eviation Alice	Israel	Fixed Wing	Battery	2022	Cancelled	2 pilot + 9 passenger, 444 km/h cruise and 1,367 km range
Flightstar e-Spyder	United States	Fixed Wing	Battery	2009	Ultralight Kit	Converted Flightstar Sportstar Spyder. Also offered as the Greenwing GW280 and Yuneec eSpyder.
Heart Aerospace X1	United States	Fixed wing	Battery	2026	Demonstrator only	
Joby Aviation S4	United States	eVTOL	Battery	2017	Prototype	Testing and preparing serial production.
La France	France	Airship	Battery	1884	Prototype	
MacCready Gossamer Penguin	United States	Fixed Wing	Solar	1980	Prototype	
MacCready Solar Challenger	United States	Fixed Wing	Solar	1981	Prototype	Flew 262 km (163 mi) from Paris to England.
Mauro Solar Riser	United States	Fixed Wing	Solar	1979	Prototype	First manned, solar-powered airplane. Based on the UFM Easy Riser. Solar cells charged battery for flight.
Militky MB-E1	West Germany	Fixed Wing	Battery	1973	Prototype	First manned airplane to fly solely on electric power.
NASA X-57 Maxwell	United States	Fixed Wing	Battery	2016	Project	Modified Tecnam P2006T.
Opener BlackFly	United States	Fixed Wing	Battery	2011	Prototype	
PC-Aero Elektra One	Germany	Fixed Wing	Solar	2011	Project	
Petróczy-Kármán-Žurovec PKZ-1	Hungary	Rotorcraft	Cable	1917	Prototype	Tethered with a cable providing power.
Pipistrel Alpha Electro	Slovenia	Fixed Wing	Battery	2011	Production	Electric version of the Pipistrel Alpha Trainer.
Pipistrel Velis Electro	Slovenia	Fixed Wing	Battery	2020	Production	Type certified. Based on the Pipistrel Virus
Rolls-Royce ACCEL	United Kingdom	Fixed Wing	Battery	2021	Prototype	
Solair 1	Germany	Fixed Wing	Solar	1983	Prototype	Developed from a Farner canard design. The Solair II flew 1998.
Solar Impulse	Switzerland	Fixed Wing	Solar	2009	Prototype	
Solar Impulse 2	Switzerland	Fixed Wing	Solar	2015	Prototype	First round-the-world flight by an electric aircraft.
Solar-Powered Aircraft Developments Solar One	United Kingdom	Fixed Wing	Solar	1979	Prototype	Solar cells charged battery for flight.
SolarStratos	Switzerland	Fixed Wing	Battery+Solar	2017	Prototype	
Solution F/Chretien Helicopter	France	Rotorcraft	Battery	2011	Prototype	First free-flying manned electric helicopter.
Sunseeker Duo	United States	Fixed Wing	Solar	2013	Prototype	
Tissandier	France	Airship	Battery	1883	Prototype	First electric powered aircraft.
TCab Tech E20	China	eVTOL	Battery	2023	Prototype	
Ultraflight Lazair Electric	Canada	Fixed Wing	Battery	2011	Prototype	
Volocopter	Germany	Rotorcraft	Battery	2008	Cancelled	
Yuneec International E430	China	Fixed Wing	Battery	2009	Production	Homebuilt aircraft.
