= Pivotal BlackFly =

American electric VTOL aircraft

BlackFly
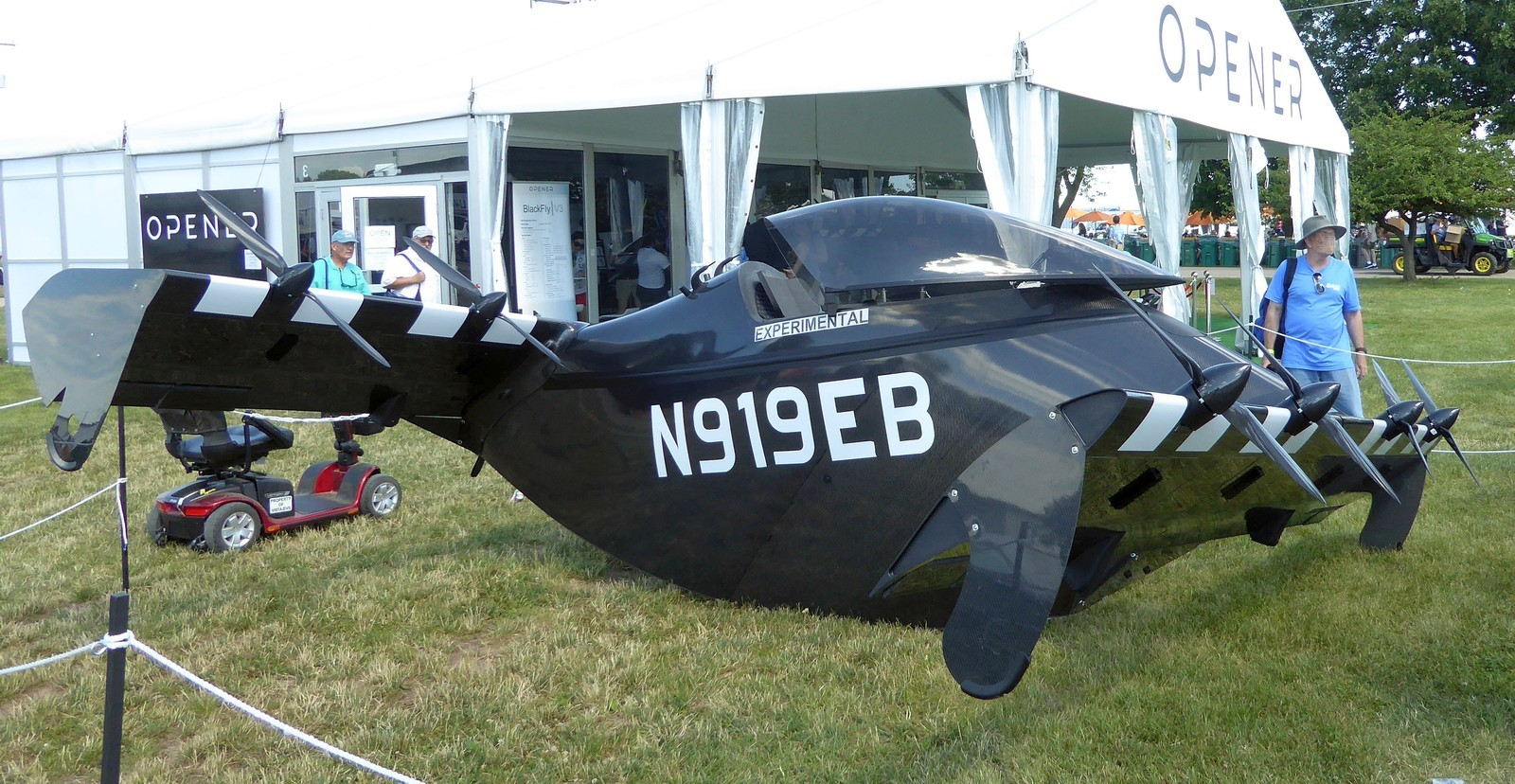

General information
- Type: Personal air vehicle
- National origin: United States
- Manufacturer: Opener Inc.
- Designer: Marcus Leng
- Status: Available to early access customers
- Number built: 13 (as of October 2024)

History
- First flight: October 5, 2011 (v0 Pre-production model)

The Pivotal BlackFly is an American electric-powered vertical take-off and landing (VTOL) personal air vehicle designed by Canadian engineer Marcus Leng and formerly produced by Opener, now Pivotal. It was publicly revealed in 2018, after nine years of development. The aircraft is supplied to customers complete and ready to fly. As of October 2024, 13 BlackFly vehicles had been sold. Pivotal is in the process of starting production of the BlackFly's successor, the Helix, at Pivotal's Palo Alto, California site.

The BlackFly is the world's first ultralight fixed-wing, all-electric, vertical take-off and landing aircraft and the first ultralight EVTOL to be sold to customers. Investors in Pivotal include Google co-founder Larry Page.

== Development ==
The first proof-of-concept version was flown on 5 October 2011, in Warkworth, Ontario, Canada, by Leng. He flew the next model, named the BlackFly, in August 2014 and then relocated the company to Palo Alto, California in September 2014. In February 2016, the second BlackFly prototype was first flown. By September 2017, the prototype had flown 10,000 mi (16,093 km) in a series of flights of at least 30 mi (48 km) each. The first pre-production aircraft was flown in October 2017.

The design is intended for the FAR 103 Ultralight Vehicles category in the United States and the Basic Ultralight Aeroplane category in Canada. The American version and international versions will have different ranges, speeds and weights to comply with national regulations.

In discussing the design in person with Leng at AirVenture in July 2018, AVweb reviewer Paul Bertorelli indicated that it is "a terrific idea and I'm betting the concept itself has legs, whether Opener's version fails to gain a market or not", but expressed concern about the lack of pricing and "cost/value relationship" marketing overreach. However, he did indicate that "It's early in their game and they have a long developmental road ahead before selling these things." Bertorelli also expressed concern that the company did not allow journalists access to look over the aircraft and would not answer any technical questions.

The new CEO of Opener, Ben Diachun, stated in January 2020 that the BlackFly was close to being ready for manufacturing and sales.

The aircraft was flown with crew in demonstrations at AirVenture 2021 and was noted as the first aircraft in its category to do so. It was also reported by the company to be in full production in July 2021. Thirteen were sold over the following three years.

Pivotal is pricing the BlackFly's successor, the Helix, at $190,000 for the base model.

== Design ==
The BlackFly is made from carbon-fiber reinforced epoxy with all-electric battery-powered propulsion. It has two 13.6 ft (4.15 m) cantilevered tandem wings, on the front and rear of a short fuselage. The fuselage has a single-seat cockpit under a bubble canopy. The forward wing is low, and the rear wing high, giving the cockpit good forward visibility while cruising. Each wing has four tractor configuration contrarotating propellers powered by electric motors. The tractor configuration prevents the flexible propellers from contacting the airframe. Each wingtip has winglets to improve lateral stability and reduce vortex drag. The aircraft weighs 313 lb (142 kg) empty and can carry a pilot and baggage totaling 250 lb (113 kg). It can accommodate a pilot of up to 6.5 ft (1.98 m) in height. A ballistic parachute comes equipped with the aircraft for use by the aviator in emergency situations.

The aircraft is not a tiltwing or tiltrotor design. Instead, the entire aircraft changes pitch in order to fly in two modes: hovering and cruising. In hover mode, the aircraft is pitched roughly vertically and maintains its position and altitude by default, though it can move laterally and longitudinally, as well as change its heading, if commanded. In cruise mode, the aircraft is pitched roughly horizontally and maintains straight and level flight by default, though it can accelerate forwards and backwards, as well as make coordinated turns, if commanded. For efficient Cruise flight, the BlackFly cants the wings and propellers to an optimal angle of attack. The forward wing has a slightly lower angle of attack to aid stall recovery. At low speeds, the forward wing will stall first, causing the nose to fall, increasing air speed and automatically exiting a stall.

The BlackFly has a defined flight envelope and its controls are triple-redundant fly-by-wire. Takeoff and landing are vertical, and the aircraft can take off into Cruise or Hover modes. The landing gear consists of a rub strip on the bottom of an amphibious hull and a small rubber bumper on the rear of the fuselage. The lower edges of the winglets are skids that limit the vehicle's roll when parked. The vehicle is designed to fly from a grass surface, but can also be flown from asphalt, snow, ice, and fresh water (in potential emergencies).

Pilot controls consist of two identical joysticks (of which only one is necessary to fly the aircraft, with the other acting as a safety redundancy), each with a thumb control for altitude. The fly-by-wire controls manage all motors, as well as the dual elevons on the outer edges of both wings. Differential motor speeds provide control authority in pitch, roll, and yaw. The elevons are in the prop wash of the outer propellers, enhancing their roll and pitch authority at low speeds.

The BlackFly also can be flown in an unmanned configuration. Most flight testing has been unmanned, operated by software with a test weight in place of a pilot. Each motor weighs 4 lb (2 kg) and produces 130 lb (59 kg) of thrust. There are two batteries per motor, located in the wing behind each motor. Adjacent batteries can be cross-connected for redundancy. The batteries are software-monitored.

== Specifications (BlackFly International) ==
Data from O'Connor and manufacturer.

General characteristics

- Crew: one
- Length: 13 ft 5 in (4.09 m)
- Wingspan: 13 ft 7 in (4.14 m)
- Height: 5 ft (1.5 m)
- Empty weight: 313 lb (142 kg)
- Gross weight: 563 lb (255 kg)
- Fuel capacity: 12 kWh
- Powerplant: 8 × 112 lb thrust/engine electric motors, 42.0 hp (31.3 kW) each
- Propellers: 2-bladed, 3 ft (0.91 m) diameter composite, high aspect ratio

Performance

- Cruise speed: 80 mph (130 km/h, 70 kn)
- Range: 40 mi (64 km, 35 nmi) plus reserves
- Rate of climb: 1,000 ft/min (5.1 m/s)

Avionics

- Full authority autopilot
- Remote controls
- VHF airband radio

== Applications ==
In 2026, a BlackFly ultralight plane was used to carry first-response gear and a paramedic to stabilize patients before an ambulance can reach the scene.

== See also ==
- eVTOL – Type of aircraft
- List of electric aircraft
