= Amazon Prime Air =

Conceptual drone-based delivery system currently in development

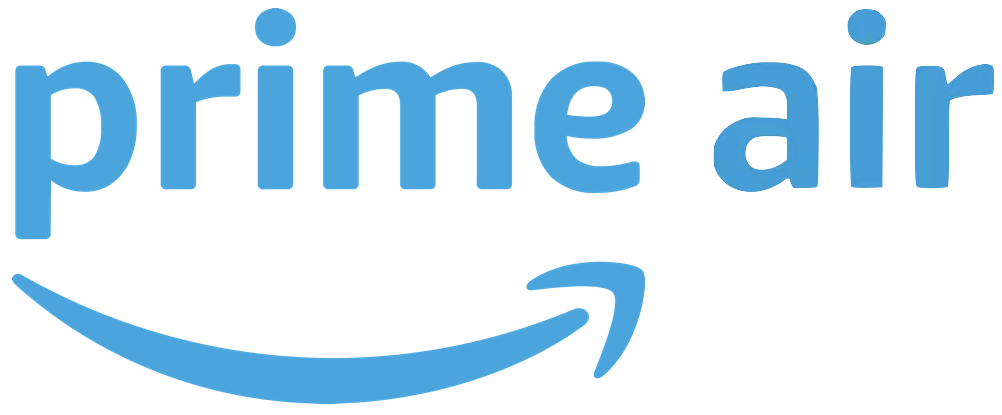
- Type: Subsidiary
- Industry: Logistics
- Founded: 2014; 12 years ago
- Area served: Lockeford, California; College Station, Texas
- Parent: Amazon
- Website: aboutamazon.com/news/tag/drone

Amazon Prime Air (or simply Prime Air) is a drone delivery service operated by Amazon. The service launched in 2022 and uses its custom MK30 delivery drones to autonomously fly individual packages to customers, typically within 60 minutes of ordering. As of February 2026 the service had made roughly 16,000 deliveries and had operations in Texas, Michigan, Arizona, Florida, and Kansas. Prime Air operates with an FAA Part 135 air carrier certification.

== History ==
=== Concept ===
In 2013, Amazon CEO Jeff Bezos revealed plans for Amazon Prime Air in an interview on 60 Minutes. The Amazon Prime Air team worked with NASA and Single European Sky ATM on trials using the Amazon air traffic management system. For additional safety, drones will fly at low altitudes (below 400 feet). There are no roads or fixed routes so there are many more options to get from point A to point B, which makes navigating a drone through the air very different from driving a car on a road. Amazon claims their traffic management system is easy to use for various operators in the same airspace because it will connect via the internet.

In 2020 the company, along with Zipline, Wingcopter and 7 others were selected by FAA to participate in a type certification program for delivery drones.

As of 2022, the cost for a single drone delivery in Amazon's ongoing U.S. trials was at least $484, which the company anticipated to reduce to $63 by 2025 - still almost 20 times as high as its average ground delivery cost. At the time, customers participating in the trials were required to install a physical marker in their backyard to specify the drop-off location, and to designate a person responsible for observing the drone's flight path. The drones cost $146,000 to build per unit, and had a reach of five kilometers.

In November 2024, Amazon began delivery operations using its MK30 delivery drone in Tolleson, Arizona for eligible items weighing five pounds or less. In October 2025 a collision between two Prime Air MK30 drones and a construction crane in Arizona led to a temporary pause in the service and probes by the FAA and NTSB.

=== United States regulations and testing under waiver program ===
In the FAA Modernization and Reform Act of 2012, Congress issued the Federal Aviation Administration a deadline of September 30, 2015 to accomplish a "safe integration of civil unmanned aircraft systems into the national airspace system." In August 2016 commercial use of UAV technology was legalized by the United States Congress.

In March 2015, the FAA granted Amazon permission to begin U.S. testing of a prototype under a waiver to the then regulations. Amazon reported that the vehicle cleared for use was obsolete. In April 2015, the FAA allowed Amazon to begin testing current models. In the interim, Amazon had begun testing at a Canadian site close to the United States border.

In June 2019, the FAA granted Amazon Prime Air a Special Airworthiness Certificate for training and research of its MK27 drone. In August 2020, the company received an FAA Part 135 air carrier certificate. The same year, Amazon began trials in several rural areas in Oregon and California, which were still ongoing as of April 2022, with about 30 different products available for delivery.

As of 2023, U.S. FAA Part 107 regulations required drones fly no higher than 400 ft. (122 m), no faster than 100 mph (161 km/h), and remain within the pilot's line of sight. Amazon has stated it intends to move towards operating above 200 ft. (61 m) and beneath 500 ft. (152 m). Amazon has stated it plans to fly drones weighing up to 55 lbs. (25 kg) within a 10 mi (16 km) radius of its warehouses, at speeds of up to 50 mph (80.5 km/h) with packages weighing up to 5 lbs. (2.26 kg) in tow.

=== United States ===
==== Launch in Lockeford, California ====
On June 13, 2022, Amazon announced that they would be delivering products using Prime Air drones to customers residing in the small town of Lockeford, California. The announcement did not provide a specific launch date other than "later this year", as Amazon was still awaiting permission from the FAA and Lockeford officials. As of April 22, 2024, this service is no longer offered in Lockeford.

==== Launch in College Station, Texas ====
College Station City Council approved a zoning change to allow Amazon to put its Prime Air facility in July 2022. The Amazon Prime Air facility in College Station, Texas, in addition to Lockeford, California, announced it was ready to begin Prime Air deliveries in a press release on December 23, 2022.

==== Launch in West Valley Phoenix, Arizona ====
In November 2024, Amazon commenced drone delivery operations in the West Valley Phoenix Metro Area, with eligible customers having access to over 50,000 products under the program.

==== Launch in Richmond, Texas ====
In May 2026, Amazon began its first drone delivery operations in a Greater Houston market from its fulfillment center in Richmond, Texas.

=== Europe ===
==== Tests in Cambridge, England ====
Amazon has patented a beehive-like structure to house delivery drones in cities, allowing Amazon to move from large single-story warehouses that temporarily store packages before they are shipped. Fulfillment centers designed to accommodate drone deliveries and operations within a certain radius are currently required.

On December 7, 2016, Amazon successfully delivered a Prime Air parcel to Cambridge, England from a fulfillment center in the Cambridge area. Amazon posted a video of the delivery on their official YouTube channel, later that month. Also in December 2016, Amazon began its first publicly available trial of Amazon Prime Air to those within several miles of Amazon's depot in Cambridge.

==== 2024 launch in UK and Italy ====
In October 2023, Amazon announced that drone deliveries will start in the United Kingdom and Italy in 2024, beginning in one site and then expanding over time. In the same announcement, Amazon also indicated that they will start operating drones in a third city in the United States.

In December 2024 Amazon announced successful initial deliveries in San Salvo, a town in the central Abruzzo region of Italy. In December 2025 Amazon ended its commercial drone delivery operations in Italy following a strategic review of the program.

== See also ==
- Wingcopter
- Wing (company)
- Zipline (drone delivery)
