= TCab Tech =

TCab Technology Co., Ltd.
- Type: Private
- Industry: Aerospace, Advanced Air Mobility
- Founder: Yon Wui Ng
- Headquarters: Shanghai, China
- Area served: Worldwide
- Key people: Yon Wui Ng (chief executive)
- Products: Manned eVTOL aircraft E20 eVTOL
- Website: www.tcabtech.com/en/

TCab Technology Co., Ltd. (also known as TCab Tech) is a company based in Shanghai, China that develops and manufactures electric vertical take-off and landing (eVTOL) aircraft. The name "TCab" stands for "time taxi." The company produces zero-emission eVTOL aircraft for public use in advanced air mobility (AAM) air ridesharing services.

== History ==
TCab Tech was founded in May 2021 by Yon Wui Ng and other engineers with backgrounds in traditional aviation and eVTOL technology.

In August 2021, the E20 25% sub-scale eVTOL prototype aircraft completed its transition flight. By December 2021, the E20 50% sub-scale eVTOL prototype aircraft successfully completed its maiden flight.

The E20 50% sub-scale eVTOL prototype aircraft successfully completed a tilt transition flight in March 2022. By May 2022, TCab Tech had partnered with Safran to equip the E20 with intelligent electric motors.

In June 2023, the E20 eVTOL prototype rolled off the production line. TCab Tech completed the frame machine test in August 2023.

In October 2023, the E20 eVTOL prototype completed its first flight. On October 27, the Civil Aviation Administration of China (CAAC) accepted its application for type certificate.

During the 7th China International Import Expo (CIIE), TCab Tech signed a memorandum of understandingwith Autocraft. The agreement aims to jointly explore the commercial applications and operations of the E20 eVTOL in the UAE, focusing on initiatives such as aerial sightseeing and urban air taxi services.

In February 2023, the company announced a Pre-A round of $15 million, and raised an additional $20 million from a strategic fund to introduce the air-taxi application in the Middle East region in 2024.

In October 2024, TCab Tech raised the hundreds of millions of yuan during its Series B financing round, with investments from HongTai Aplus, AnTai Fund, and GuoTou Group. At the same time, the company announced plans to establish a manufacturing plant in the Wanzhi District of Wuhu, Anhui Province. The local government agreed to provide financial facilitation and operational support for the E20 eVTOL project.

In January 2025, the European Union Aviation Safety Agency (EASA) awarded type certification to Safran's ENGINeUS 100 motor. TCab Tech had signed a cooperation agreement with Safran in 2022 to integrate this motor into the E20 aircraft, making it the first tilt-rotor eVTOL equipped with the certified propulsion system.

In March 2025, the E20 eVTOL completed its structural validation campaign, which tested ground operations, flight maneuvers, gust loads, and system failure conditions. Later that month, TCab Tech secured Series B+ funding, co-led by Grand Neo Bay Venture Capital and Chiforturne Venture Capital, to fund operations in Shanghai and the Yangtze River Delta region.

In April 2025, BOC Leasing placed a purchase order for 100 E20 aircraft.

In July 2025, TCab Tech signed a memorandum of understanding (MoU) with Autocraft, a technology enterprise based in the United Arab Emirates. The agreement covered the potential delivery of up to 350 electric aircraft for aerial sightseeing and air mobility operations in the Middle East and North Africa (MENA) region.

In October 2025, TCab Tech conducted the first manned flight test of the E20 eVTOL. The flight was piloted by the company's Chief Test Pilot, with founder and CEO Yon Wui Ng on board as a passenger. The E20 subsequently completed its transition flight tests in December 2025.

In November 2025, the company announced a partnership with China Simulation Sciences (CSS) to develop an aviation simulation and training system for the E20.

At the 8th China International Import Expo (CIIE) that same month, TCab Tech launched the "Air Silk Road Global Pioneer Partnership" and signed an MoU with the Singapore-based firm NexAvian to support expansion into Southeast Asia.

In November 2025, TCab Tech raised RMB 300 million in a Series B++ funding round, with participation from Meridian Capital, HuaHan Capital, and Puhua Capital.

In July 2026, TCab Tech appointed PT Intercrus Aero Indonesia (Intercrus) as its authorized partner in Indonesia to support the development of Advanced Air Mobility (AAM) opportunities in the country. The collaboration includes regulatory engagement with Indonesian aviation authorities, ecosystem development, and feasibility studies for potential future deployment of TCab's E20 eVTOL aircraft.

In October 2026, TCab Tech signed an MOU with the Selangor Information Technology & Digital Economy Corporation (Sidec) to explore commercialisation of the E20 eVTOL in Malaysia. Under the agreement, Sidec would facilitate engagement with government agencies and industry partners to support certification and commercialisation. During the same month, TCab Tech launched a month-long public showcase of the E20 eVTOL at IOI City Mall in Putrajaya, marking the aircraft's first public appearance in Malaysia.

== Aircraft ==
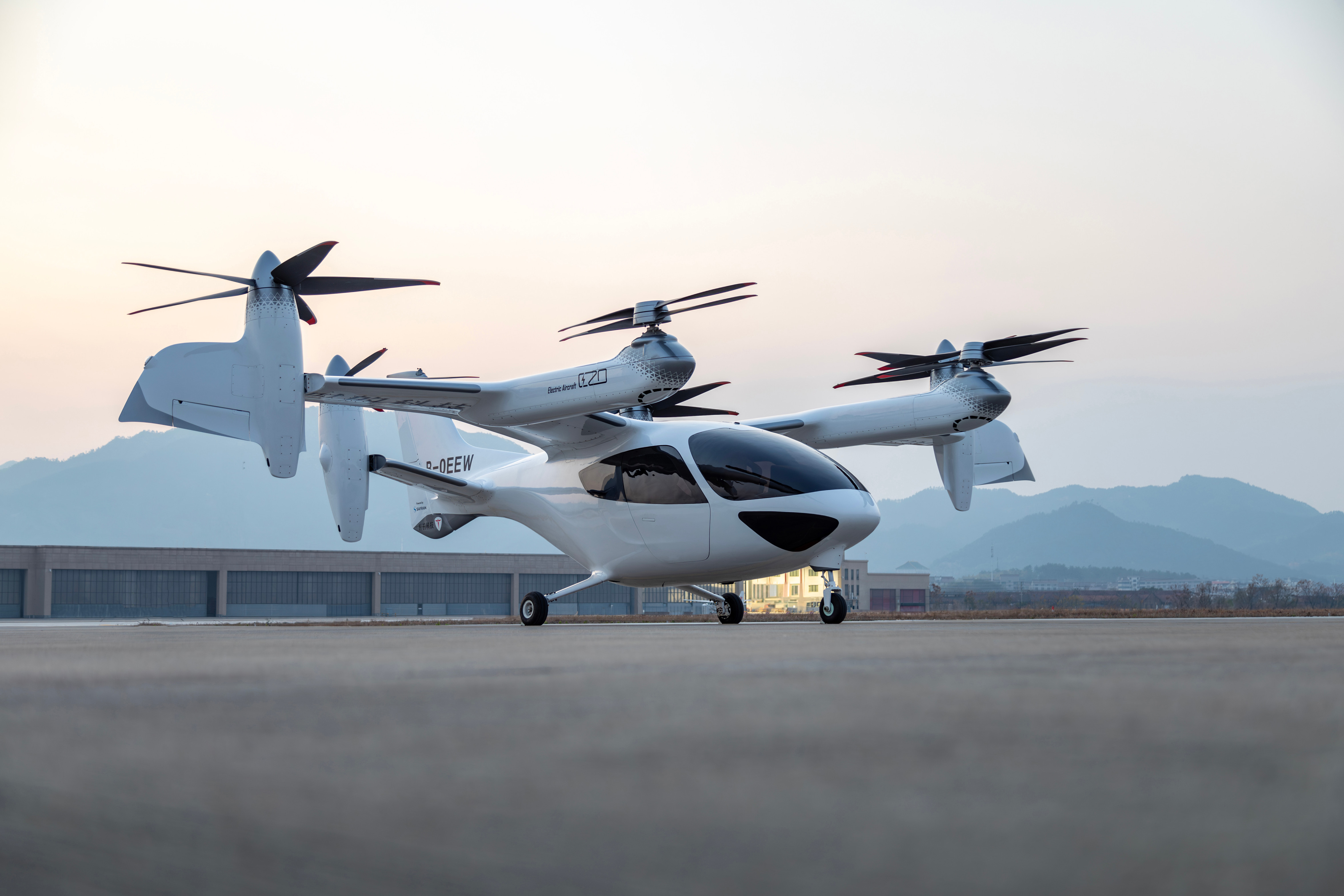
The E20 eVTOL demonstrates flight at the flight center

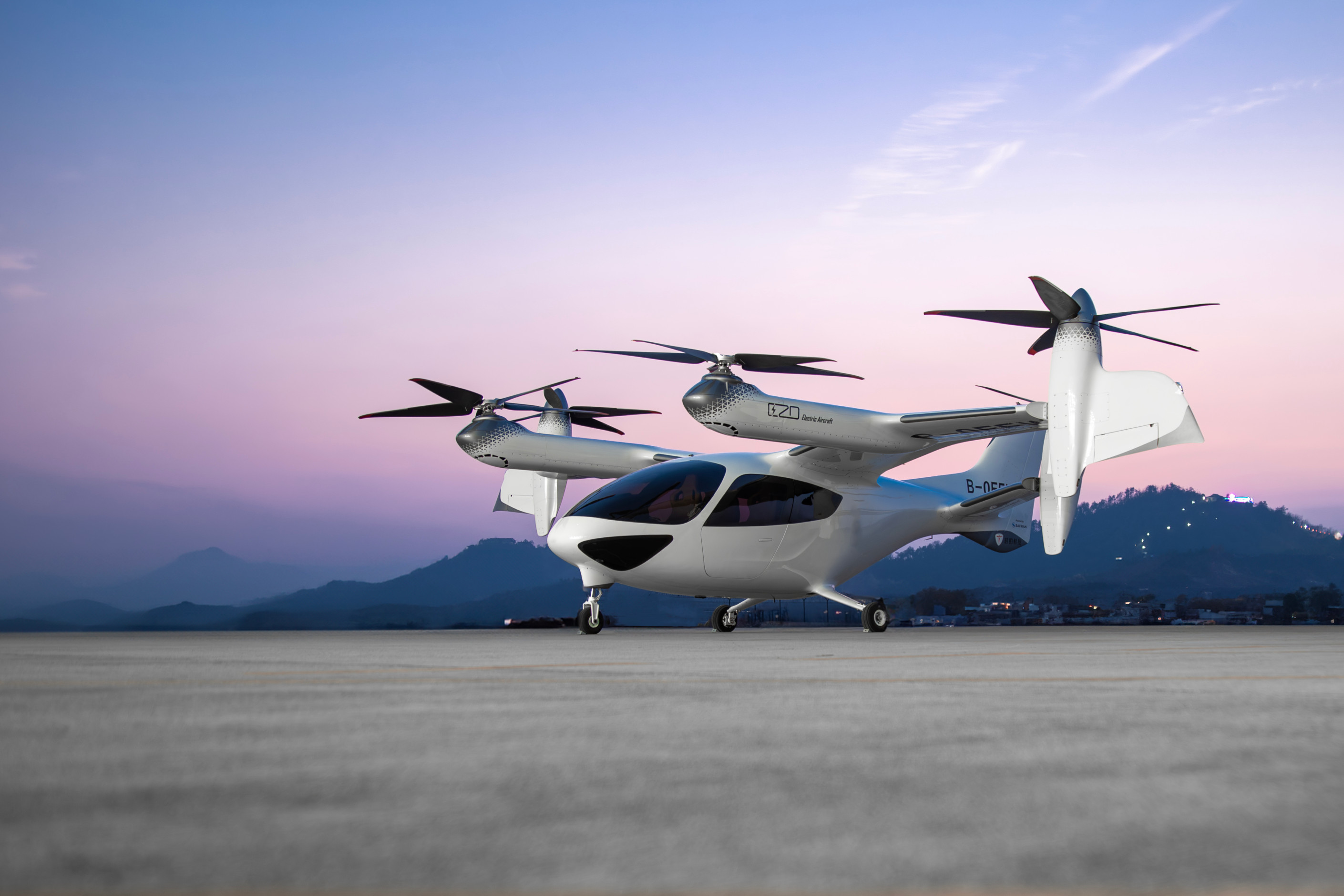
E20 eVTOL parked on the taxiway after completing its flight demonstration at the testing center

E20 eVTOL

TCab Tech is currently focusing on developing a passenger-carrying vectored thrust eVTOL aircraft that adopts a tilt-rotor configuration, called the E20 eVTOL.

Specifications:

- Piloting: 1 pilot
- Capacity: 4 passengers
- Cruise speed: 260 km/h (162 mph)
- Maximum speed: 320 km/h (199 mph)
- Range: 200 km (125 miles)
- Cruise altitude range: 300–600 m (984–1,969 ft)
- Maximum payload: 450 kg (992 lb)
- Propellers: 6 propellers (4 tilt-propellers, 2 double-stacked VTOL propellers)
- Electric Motors: 6 electric motors

== See also ==
- eVTOL
- Flying car
- Electric aircraft
- Urban air mobility
- Air taxi
