= Personal aircraft =

Personal aircraft may refer to:

- Flying platform, a VTOL capable personal aircraft
- General aviation, which includes privately owned aircraft for personal use
- Personal air vehicle, a proposed on-demand air taxi class of service
