= Volocopter VC2 =

German experimental air vehicle

VC-2
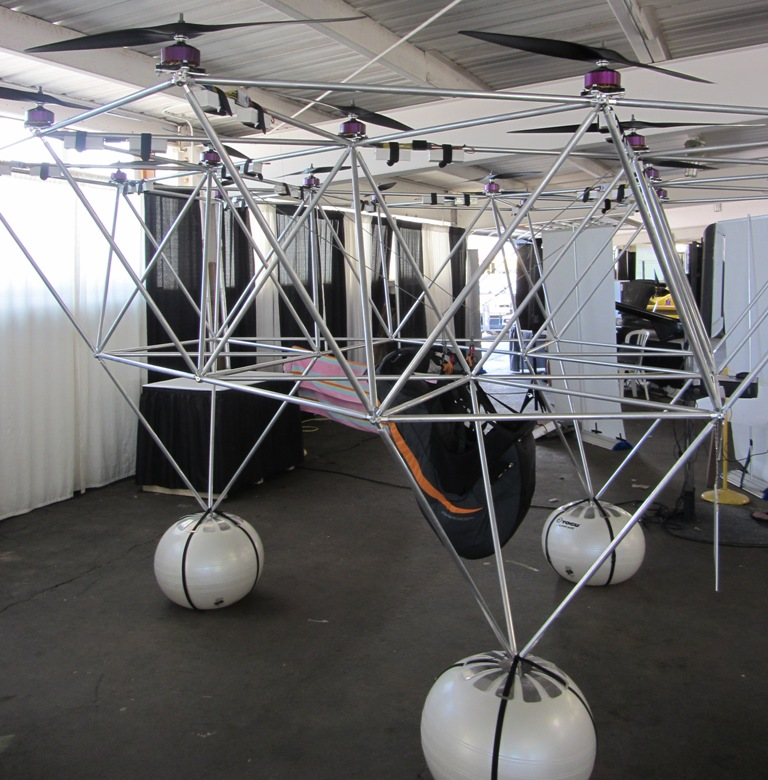

General information
- Type: Multirotor, personal air vehicle
- National origin: Germany
- Manufacturer: Volocopter GmbH
- Status: In development

History
- Introduction date: 2012
- First flight: November 2013
- Developed from: E-volo VC1
- Variant: Volocopter 2X

The Volocopter VC2 is a German single-place experimental electric multirotor personal air vehicle that was built by Volocopter GmbH (formerly called E-Volo) of Bruchsal, Germany.

== Design and development ==
The VC-2 is the second in a series of multirotor designs from the German company e-volo. The single-place, 16 motor, all-electric e-volo VC1 "Volocopter" was demonstrated on 21 October 2011. The VC2 is the next follow-on with 18 engines suspended around an aluminum truss frame that includes a center-mounted seat, battery, and Battery Management Unit. The proof-of-concept aircraft will be used to develop the E-volo VC Evolution 2P, a two-passenger enclosed volocopter with extended range and weight capabilities.

The VC200 was demonstrated unmanned in November 2013 at an enclosed arena in Karlsruhe, Germany. Two prototypes performed unmanned flight tests, with the first manned flight made on March 30, 2016, by Alexander Zosel.

== Specifications ==
Data from EAA, Manufacturer

General characteristics

- Crew: one
- Powerplant: 18 × Direct drive electric, 2 kW (2.7 hp) each
- Propellers: two-bladed

External image
- VC200 Video

== See also ==
- List of rotorcraft
