= Urban air mobility =

Urban transportation using air travel

Urban air mobility (UAM) is the use of small, highly automated aircraft for the transportation of passengers or cargo at low altitudes within urban and suburban areas. This development has emerged as a response to increasing traffic congestion. The term generally refers to existing and emerging technologies such as traditional helicopters, vertical-takeoff-and-landing aircraft (VTOL), electrically propelled vertical-takeoff-and-landing aircraft (eVTOL), and unmanned aerial vehicles (UAVs). These aircraft are characterized by the use of multiple electric-powered rotors or fans for lift and propulsion, along with fly-by-wire systems to control them. The concept of urban air mobility has been explored by inventors since the early days of powered flight. However, advances in materials, computerized flight controls, batteries, and electric motors improved innovation and designs beginning in the late 2010s. Most UAM proponents envision that the aircraft will be owned and operated by professional operators, as is currently the case with taxi services, rather than by private individuals.

Urban air mobility is a subset of the broader advanced air mobility (AAM) concept that includes other use cases than intra-city passenger transport; According to NASA, AAM includes a variety of technologies, such as small drones, electric aircraft, and automated air traffic management, that perform a wide variety of missions, including cargo and logistics operations. This definition is also supported by the drone market consulting firm Drone Industry Insights, who also includes vertiports into its definition of AAM and UAM.

== History ==
=== Pre-history ===
The development of the earliest predecessors of UAM aircraft began in the early 1900s with early concepts of "flying cars" such as Glenn Curtiss's Autoplane, developed in 1917. Three years later, Henry Ford began prototyping "plane cars" as single-seat aircraft, but halted development after a fatal crash in early tests. One of the first vertical-takeoff-and-landing aircraft (VTOLs) was the 1924 Berliner No. 5. It recorded its best performance when it reached a height of 4.57 m (15 ft) during a one-minute, thirty-five second flight. Pitcairn, Cierva, Buhl and other manufacturers developed autogyros prototypes. The Avrocar was a disk-shaped aircraft designed for military use. Initially funded by the Canadian government, the project was dropped due to costs until the U.S. Army and Air Force took over the development of the Avrocar in 1958. The Avrocar encountered issues with both thrust and stability and the project was eventually canceled in 1961.

=== Helicopters and air taxi services ===
Beginning in the early 1950s, air operators offered UAM air taxi services via helicopters in a handful of U.S. cities, including New York, Los Angeles, and San Francisco. In 1964, New York Airways (NYA) and Pan American offered more than 30 flights between John F. Kennedy International Airport and Newark Liberty International Airport with stops in Manhattan such as Wall Street. The average cost for a one-way fare was $4–11.

From 1964 to 1968, PanAm offered regular helicopter connections between midtown Manhattan and John F. Kennedy International Airport, allowing passengers to connect directly to their flights from the New York City Pan American building. The service was halted in 1979 after a crash in 1977 killed four people on the roof and one on the ground below. In the 1980s, Trump Shuttle offered helicopter service between Wall Street and LaGuardia Airport, utilizing Sikorsky S-61 helicopters. The service was discontinued in the 1990s after Trump Shuttle was acquired by US Airways. In 1986, Helijet began as a helicopter airline with routes between Vancouver and Victoria in British Columbia.

BLADE, launched in 2014 in New York City, providing helicopter-based air taxi services. BLADE has since launched similar services in the San Francisco Bay Area and Mumbai. In 2017 Voom, a subsidiary of aircraft maker Airbus, flew more than 15,000 passengers in São Paulo, Brazil using Airbus helicopters. The Voom UAM demonstration program operated for four years and was shut down in March 2020. In 2019, Uber began to offer Uber Copter in Lower Manhattan New York to John F. Kennedy International Airport. Some cities have encouraged the idea of inexpensive, point-to-point air travel as a way of reducing traffic congestion and moving goods.

=== VTOLs and eVTOLs ===
By the mid-2000s, aircraft designers were incorporating technologies pioneered in small drones into new aircraft designs for passengers. These technologies included distributed propulsion (the use of multiple rotors or fans), lithium ion batteries, inexpensive accelerometers, miniaturized navigation systems and carbon-fiber construction.In 2010, Kitty Hawk Corporation, funded by Google Co-founder Larry Page, began development of the Kitty Hawk Flyer. On October 5, 2011, Marcus Leng, Founder of Opener, piloted the first manned flight of a fixed-wing all electric VTOL aircraft. On October 21, 2011, the co-founder and primary designer of Volocopter, Thomas Senkel, flew the first manned flight of an electric multicopter, the Volocopter VC1 prototype. In 2012, Joby Aviation and NASA partnered to prototype an experimental eVTOL. In 2014, The Leading Edge Asynchronous Propeller Technology (LEAPTech) project was launched as a collaboration of NASA Langley Research Center and NASA Armstrong Flight Research Center along with Empirical Systems Aerospace (ESAero) and Joby Aviation.

Lockheed Martin debuted their optionally piloted helicopter, the S-76B Sikorsky Autonomous Research Aircraft (SARA) in 2019, in downtown Los Angeles. In 2018, the Wisk Cora eVTOL test flight occurred in Mountain View, CA. That same year, Opener flew the BlackFly a personal air vehicle, after nine years of development. Joby Aviation tested its tilt-rotor UAM vehicle in flight in March 2021. In June 2021, EHang completed the first pilotless test flight of the AAV EHang216 in Honshu, China. In the same month, Volocopter demonstrated its first public flight of an electric air taxi in France along with remote-controlled flight of its eVTOL, the Volocopter 2X. In July 2021, Joby completed a flight of its eVTOL that flew a 150-mile flight on a single battery charge by flying in a 14-mile circle 11 times for a total flight time of one hour and 17 minutes.

Air mobility is progressing in both manned and UAV directions. In Hamburg, the WiNDroVe project – (use of drones in a metropolitan area) was implemented from May 2017 through January 2018. In Ingolstadt, Germany the Urban Air Mobility project began in June 2018, involving Audi, Airbus, the Carisma Research Center, the Fraunhofer Application Center for Mobility, the THI University of Applied Sciences (THI in the artificial intelligence research network) and other partners. Envisioned was use of UAM in emergency services, transport of blood and organs, traffic monitoring, public safety and passenger transport.

The German, Dutch and Belgian cities Maastricht, Aachen, Hasselt, Heerlen and Liège joined the UAM Initiative of the European Innovation Partnership on Smart Cities and Communities (EIP-SCC). Toulouse, France, is participating in the European Urban Air Mobility Initiative. The project is coordinated by Airbus, the European institutional partner Eurocontrol and EASA (European Aviation Safety Agency).

=== Voom implementation ===
The concept was realized in São Paulo, Brazil, with over 15,000 passengers flown by Voom. There, urban air mobility was provided by helicopters. Helicopter air taxis are already available in Mexico City, Mexico. Fast air connections are still associated with high costs, and cause considerable noise and high energy consumption.

The Voom UAM demonstration program operated for four years, and was shut down in March 2020.

== Aircraft ==
Aircraft type	Description
Short take-off and landing (STOL)	STOL aircraft have shorter runway requirements for both takeoff and landing.
Small unmanned aircraft (SUA)	SUAs are unmanned aircraft with a total weight (including cargo) under 55 pounds (25 kg).
Unmanned aerial vehicles (UAV)	UAVs are more commonly referred to as "drones" and can be piloted remotely or autonomously. While most UAVs are used to transport cargo, larger UAVs could transport passengers with no ability to intervene in the craft's operation.
Unmanned aircraft (UA)	UAs generally refer to aircraft without the possibility of human intervention in the craft's operation, from either pilots or passengers.
Vertical take-off and landing (VTOL)	VTOL aircraft can take off and land vertically, as well as hover. eVTOLs are electrically powered VTOL aircraft.

Personal air vehicles (PAVs) are under development for urban air mobility. These include projects such as the CityAirbus demonstrator, the Lilium Jet or the Volocopter, the EHang 216 and the experimental Boeing Passenger Air Vehicle.

In the concept phase, urban air mobility aircraft, having VTOL capabilities, are deployed to take off and land vertically in a relatively small area to avoid the need of a runway. The majority of designs are electric and use multiple rotors to minimize noise (due to rotational speed) while providing high system redundancy. Many of them have completed their first flight.

The most common configurations of urban air mobility aircraft are multicopters (such as the Volocopter) or so-called tiltwing convertiplane aircraft (e.g. A³ Vahana). The first type uses only rotors with vertical axis, while the second additionally have propulsion and lift systems for horizontal flight (e.g. pressure propeller and wing).

== Power source ==
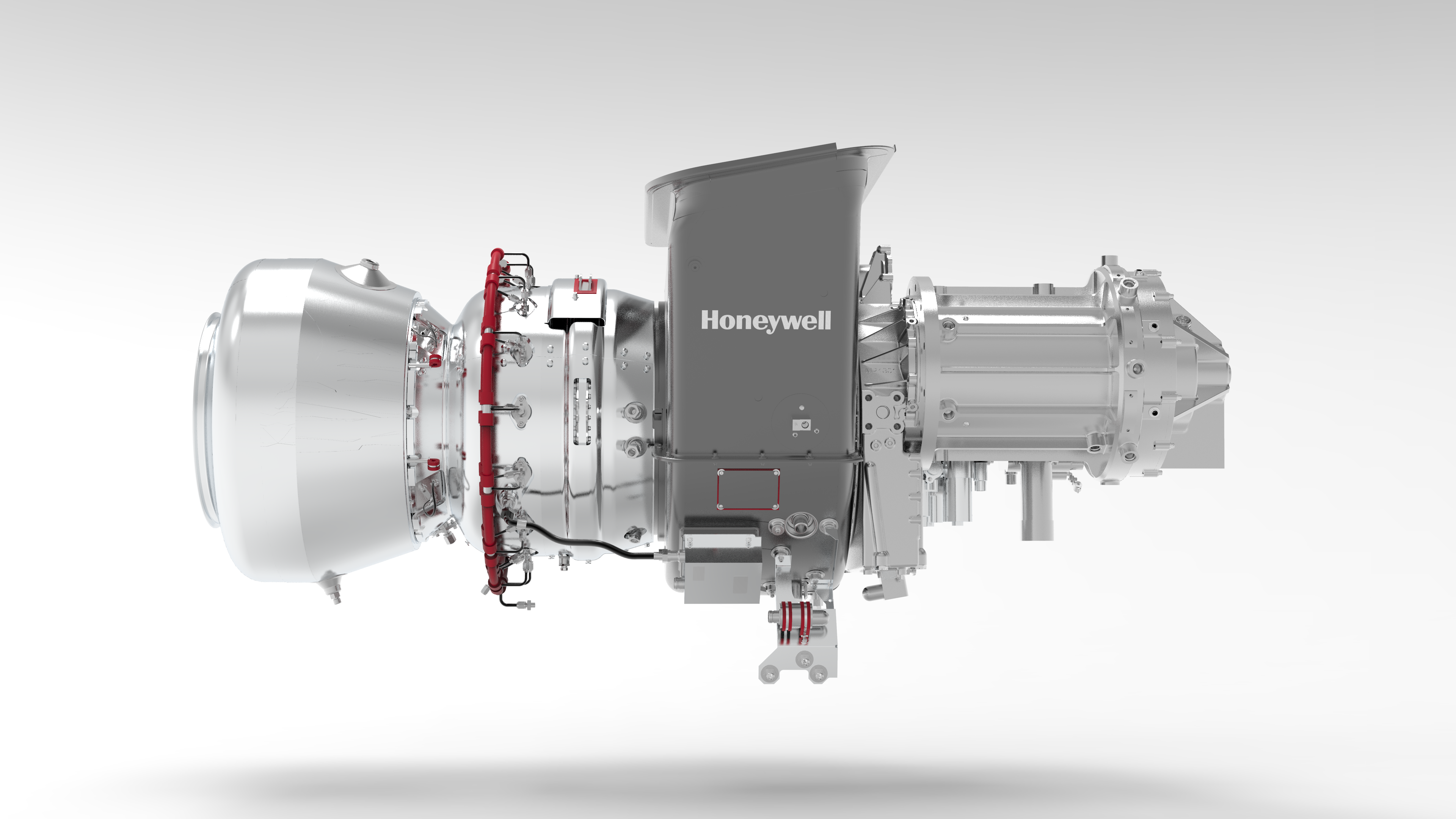
1MW turbogenerator

In order for UAM aircraft to be most efficient, recharging and refueling must be done as quickly as possible, whether that is swapping batteries, fast recharging batteries, or hydrogen refueling.

=== Conventional fuel ===
Conventional fossil fuels are readily available and offer high power density (the amount of power produced per kilogram of fuel). However, traditional piston or turbine engines emit smoke and noise. The heavy mechanical linkages needed to distribute power limit the number and configuration of rotors on an aircraft.

=== Sustainable or synthetic aviation fuel ===
Synthetic fuels have the potential to produce nearly CO_{2}-neutral energy while utilizing existing refueling infrastructure. But they pose the same challenges as conventional fuel in terms of noise and mechanical limitations.

=== Electric ===
Rechargeable batteries are often used in UAVs and eVTOLs. Emerging eVTOL vehicles are limited by the relatively low energy density to weight ratio in current battery technology, as well as the lack of infrastructure required for recharging stations.

=== Hybrid-electric ===
Hybrid-electric systems use a combination of internal combustion engine (ICE) and electric propulsion system components. Different combinations are possible. These systems can provide combined advantages from different energy sources, but still must be viewed in terms of the overall system's efficiency.

=== Hydrogen fuel cells ===
Hydrogen fuel cells generate electricity by circulating hydrogen gas through a catalytic membrane. Small fuel cells can power light drones for three times longer than equivalent batteries. Fuel cells are in development for larger aircraft. Experimental regional aircraft retrofitted with fuel cell-electric propulsion systems have flown in 2023. In January 2023, ZeroAvia flew a Dornier 228 with one original Honeywell TPE 331 turboprop engine on the right wing and a proprietary ZeroAvia hydrogen-electric engine on the left wing. In March 2023, Universal Hydrogen's electric Dash 8-300 made its maiden flight.

== Propulsion ==
Common VTOL and eVTOL configurations include:

=== Multirotor or multicopter ===
Multirotor aircraft have small wings, or no wings at all. They use downward-facing propellers or fans to generate the majority of their lift.

=== Lift-plus-cruise ===
Lift-plus-cruise aircraft utilize vertically mounted propellers for take-off and landing, but a horizontal propeller and wings for sustained cruise flight.

=== Ducted fans ===
Ducted fans are a type of propeller mounted within a duct, which optimizes the thrust from the tips of the blades.

=== Tiltrotors ===
Tiltrotor aircraft lift exclusively by rigid propeller and have no other horizontal propulsion type. They generate horizontal thrust by physically tilting the rotors into a horizontal position once airborne.

=== Tiltwing ===
Tiltwing aircraft are similar to tiltrotor aircraft, but rather than independently rotating the rotors, the entire wing is rotated.

== Flight controls ==
Flight controls consists of flight control surfaces, cockpit controls, and operating mechanisms to control an aircraft's direction in flight. Honeywell, Pipistrel, Vertical Aerospace, Lilium and other companies are collaborating to create new flight controls for a variety of eVTOL aircraft. Honeywell developed a fly-by-wire computer that controls multiple rotors, a detection and avoidance radar to navigate traffic, and software to track landing zones for repeatable vertical landings.

=== Fly by wire ===
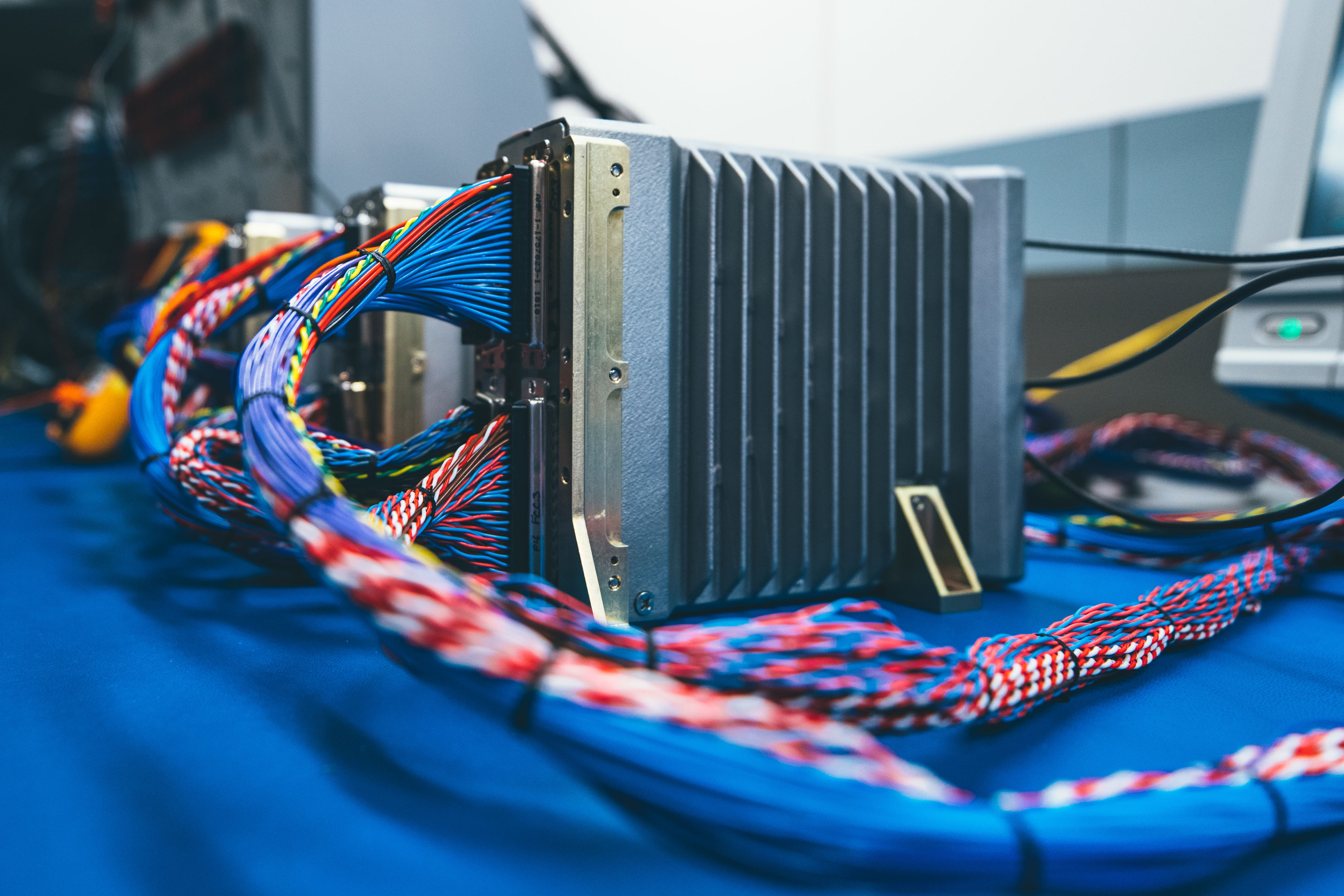
Compact fly-by-wire system workbench

Fly-by-wire systems translate a pilot's inputs into commands sent to an aircraft's motors, propeller governors, ailerons, elevators and other moving surfaces. They are essential in multirotor designs because human pilots cannot control multiple propellers without computer assistance. In June 2019, Honeywell introduced a miniaturized computer specifically designed for UAM aircraft.

=== Software ===
Advanced autonomous eVTOL fleets require management software to scale to profitable levels. Pilot training is costly and expensive, and pilots themselves take up much of an aircraft's payload. So many manufacturers are designing aircraft that can fly autonomously as automation technology improves. Sikorsky is developing MATRIX technology, while Honeywell is partnered with Pipistrel and other manufacturers to develop automatic landing systems for their respective aircraft. Artificial intelligence (AI) and machine learning are necessary to develop autonomous craft, but pose a complication to certification because they are non-deterministic, i.e. they may behave differently given the same input in the same scenario.

=== Avionics ===
Avionics are electronic systems designed for aircraft. Honeywell is developing integrated avionics systems comprising a vehicle management system, autonomous navigation, a fly-by-wire control system, and compact satellite connectivity. The avionics are modular and able to integrate with third-party applications. The architecture can also incorporate simplified vehicle operations, which replaces traditional pilot displays with imagery that is similar to a car GPS system or smartphone app.

== Infrastructure ==
UAM requires infrastructure for vehicles to take off, land, be repaired, recharge or refuel, and park. The size of the physical infrastructure determines the market size, as trips can only be completed between established landing areas. While some components can be integrated into existing aviation and aerospace infrastructure, additional facilities need to be constructed. For large cities it is estimated that there could be 85–100 take-off and landing pads to accommodate a UAM environment.

=== Vertiports ===
According to the FAA, a vertiport is an identifiable ground or elevated area, that can be associated with various equipment and facilities, used for the take off and landing of tiltrotor aircraft and rotorcraft. The industry has used different terms for describing the various levels of equipment and sizes of these facilities. Vertipads are simple landing pads designed to be used by one aircraft at a time. Vertiports or vertibases can feature one or more final approach and takeoff (FATO) and touch-down and lift-off (TLOF) areas, as well as several VTOL stands and other aircraft and passenger facilities. Vertihubs are larger aviation facilities serving the largest structure in the UAM environment. They can offer services such as FBOs and MROs. Vertihubs would serve concentrated high-traffic regions.

In 2020, Lilium announced their plans to construct a vertiport near Orlando International Airport. Joby has partnered with REEF Technology and Neighborhood Property Group (NPG) to use the rooftops of parking structures as take-off and landing areas.

=== Helipads ===
Existing helipads, or helicopter landing pads, can be used to accommodate UAM aircraft. Helipads are insufficient to sustain the industry without construction of additional infrastructure or modification of existing helipads.

=== Airports ===
Airports are already being used in limited locations to facilitate on-demand helicopter and eVTOL services. Such airports include John Wayne Airport, John F. Kennedy International Airport, and Portland International Airport.

=== Air traffic management ===
Unmanned aircraft systems (UAS) traffic management (collectively UTM) is a specific air traffic management system designed around the unique needs of unmanned and low-altitude aircraft. UTM provides airspace integrations necessary for ensuring safe operation through services such as design of the actual airspace, delineations of air corridors, dynamic geofencing to maintain flight paths, weather avoidance, and route planning without continuous human monitoring. Airspace Link developed AirHub, a system to connect cities, states, drone operators, and the FAA into a single space to map out the safest routes for autonomous drones using publicly available flight data.

=== Regulations ===
Governments around the world have begun debating changes to their airspace rules to accommodate high numbers of autonomous or semi-autonomous aircraft operating at low altitudes. NASA and EASA have proposed concepts for the requirements of a UAM system. NASA's concept of operations, or ConOps, relies on defined corridors for UAM craft which must then abide by specific protocols when inside the corridor. EASA's regulatory approach leaves local decision to "local actors" and will instead seek to certify the aircraft themselves for safety. They developed the VTOL special condition to certify the specific class of aircraft that were previously undefined.

== Certifications ==
=== Aircraft ===
Aircraft need to be certified as airworthy, as well as registered with the appropriate governing body. Regulations for UAM aircraft are most similar to helicopter regulations but will need additional regulations for electric and/or autonomous craft. FAA established certification basis for its eVTOL craft. eVTOLs are classified with the FAA as an airplane that can take off and land vertically. EASA released special condition VTOL certification to separate VTOLs and eVTOLs from conventional rotorcraft or fixed-wing aircraft. Archer Aviation uses a blend of the FAA Part 23, 27, 33, 35, and 36 requirements to certify its eVTOL. BETA applied for eVTOL certification under Part 23 with the FAA. BETA was the first manned eVTOL to receive military airworthiness from the Air Force.

=== Operations ===
All VTOL and eVTOL aircraft that carry persons or property for hire must be flown by an appropriately certificated operator. Joby applied for a FAA Part 135 certificate to operate their own aircraft for UAM projects. Lilium partnered with Luxaviation to operate eVTOL jets in Europe.

=== Pilots ===
Pilots need to be certified to operate an eVTOL and remote eVTOLs. Pilots can obtain a commercial pilot license (CPL(H)) or an air transport pilot license (ATPL(H)) for manned craft. CAE is developing training programs utilizing data analytics with complex simulators. CAE and BETA partnered to offer eVTOL pilot and maintenance technician training for ALIA eVTOLs. CAE and Volocopter partnered to develop a pilot training program for Volocopter eVTOLs.

=== Mechanics ===
Mechanics also need to be certified, but as this is an emerging industry, there are not yet regulations in place to do so for the relevant aircraft and technologies.

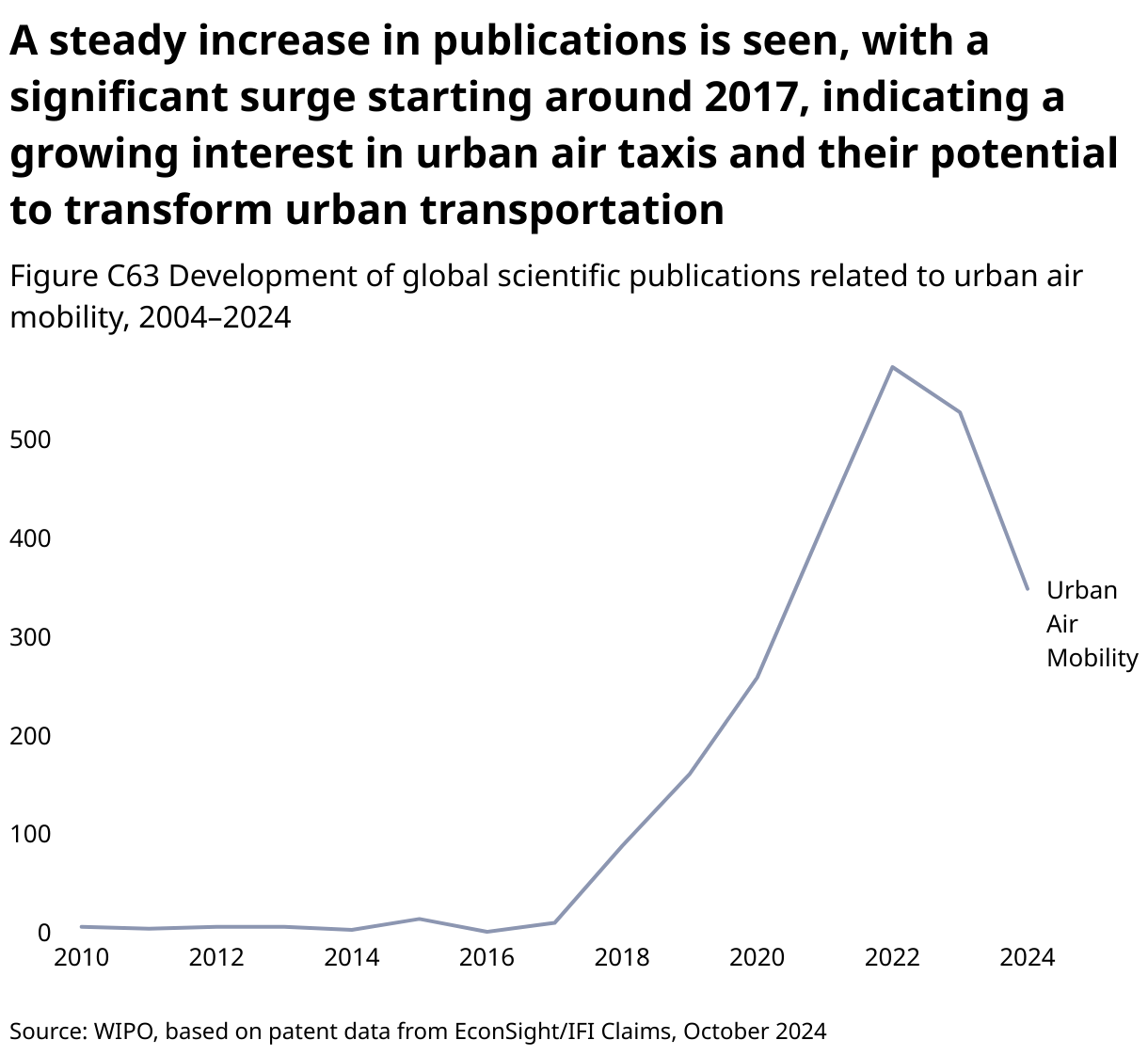
Scientific publications related to urban air transport

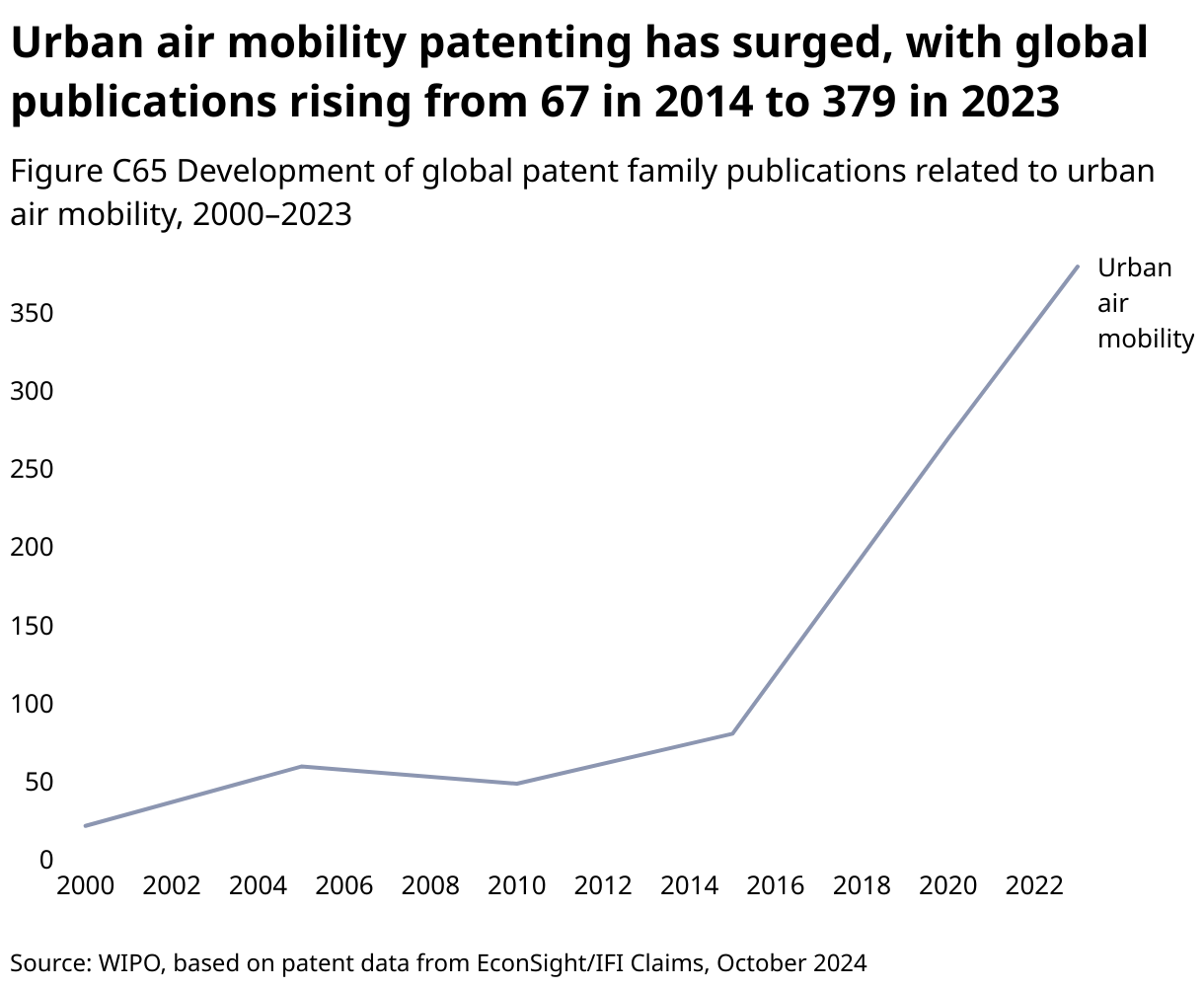
Registered patents related to urban air transport

== Innovation and development ==
Despite their potential advantages, urban air mobility has several current limitations. The development and certification of eVTOLs is complex and requires significant investment. Additionally, there are technical challenges related to battery technology, flight safety and noise reduction. Ensuring the reliability and safety of urban air taxis in various operating conditions is critical. Urban air taxis have limited range and payload capacity compared to traditional aircraft, primarily due to battery constraints. The infrastructure required for urban air taxi operations, such as vertiports and charging stations, is in the early stages of development as of early 2025. Regulatory frameworks and air traffic management systems need to be established to support the safe integration of urban air taxis into the existing airspace.

A report published by WIPO in 2025 show a recent but steady increase of patents publication in Urban air mobility.The scientific community has shown an increasing interest in urban air taxis, as evidenced by the growing number of publications on the topic, with a significant surge starting around 2017. Research focuses on improving eVTOL technology, assessing environmental impacts and enhancing the safety and efficiency of urban air mobility. In 2023, the United States leads with a significant number of publications, followed by Germany, South Korea, China, the United Kingdom, Italy, France, the Netherlands, Canada, and India.

Besides, patenting activity in the field of urban air mobility has picked up speed significantly over the last 10 years. The number of global patent family publications has jumped from 67 in 2014 to 379 in 2023. The key patentees are Textron, Beta Technologies and Boeing.

== Applications ==
Applications include commute, law enforcement, air medical, fire, private security, and military.

== Public acceptance ==
Public acceptance of UAM relies on a variety of factors, including but not limited to safety, energy consumption, noise, security, and social equity.

Safety risks overlap with most current aircraft risks, including the potential for flights outside of approved airspace, proximity to people and/or buildings, critical system failures or loss of control, and hull loss. In the case of autonomous or remote-piloted aircraft, cybersecurity becomes a risk as well. The type of and volume of the noise caused by aircraft and rotorcraft are two leading factors regarding the public perception of eVTOL craft in UAM applications.

Specific security concerns include the physical security of passengers in the absence of crew members and the cybersecurity of both the craft and the systems governing it. In regard to social equity, the high initial costs of UAM services could prove to be detrimental to public opinion, especially as the affordability of services and technologies is not guaranteed. In the NASA UAM market study, respondents with higher incomes were more likely to take UAM trips. An EASA survey showed that 83% of respondents had a positive attitude towards UAM, while 71% were ready to try UAM services. Projects underway include Lilium announcing to create the first U.S. vertihub in Orlando for its on-demand electric jet service and EHang created an UAM pilot program in Spain in the city of Seville.

=== Training and education ===
Volocopter and CAE partnered to create the first eVTOL pilot training and development program in July 2021.

== See also ==
- Lists of aviation topics
- List of aviation, avionics, aerospace and aeronautical abbreviations
- Index of aviation articles

== Sources ==
- This article incorporates text from a free content work. Licensed under CC-BY-4.0. Text taken from WIPO Technology Trends: Future of Transportation, WIPO.
