= EHang =

Company

Guangzhou EHang Intelligent Technology Co. Ltd.
- Logo
- Formerly: Beijing Yi-Hang Creation Science & Technology Co., Ltd. Chinese: 北京亿航创世科技有限公司
- Type: Public
- Traded as: Nasdaq: EH
- Industry: Aerospace, Advanced Air Mobility
- Founded: 2014; 12 years ago
- Founder: Huazhi Hu, Yifang (Derrick) Xiong
- Headquarters: Guangzhou, China (headquarters)
- Area served: Worldwide
- Key people: Huazhi Hu
- Products: Autonomous aerial vehicles Ghost, Hexacopter, Ehang 184, Ehang 216
- Revenue: ▼CN¥418 million (2025)
- Net income: ▼ −CN¥276 million (2025)
- Number of employees: 233 (2020)
- Website: www.ehang.com

Guangzhou EHang Intelligent Technology Co. Ltd. (Chinese: 广州亿航智能技术有限公司) is a company based in Guangzhou, China that develops and manufactures autonomous aerial vehicles (AAVs) and passenger AAVs which have entered service in China for aerial cinematography, photography, emergency response, and survey missions.

== History ==
EHang announced the Ehang 184, introduced at the Consumer Electronics Show in January 2016, as the world's first AAV capable of carrying passengers.

The company announced plans with Dubai's Road & Transportation Agency in 2017 to launch an autonomous flying-taxi service starting in the summer of 2017, but didn't succeed. The company has also worked on a project with Nevada's Institute for Autonomous Systems for an AAV taxi that can transport a single passenger for up to 23 minutes with the EHang 184.

In November 2018, an agreement was signed with the city of Lyon, France, to open a research center there. At the same time, a cooperation agreement was concluded with the Austrian aerospace group FACC to further develop, certify and produce for EHang in Europe as well.

On December 12, 2019 EHang was listed on the NASDAQ with the symbol EH. On March 18, 2020, EHang decided to go into a strategic partnership with Llíria, a Spanish city, using the marketing term urban air mobility. This includes tourism as well as logistics. The City Council and EHang will also work with the Spanish Aviation Safety and Security Agency. Llíria is the second city in Spain where EHang has an agreement.

The EH216-S was approved for commercial flights in 2023. Approval was extended to unpiloted flights (limited to taking off and landing at the same vertiport) by the Civil Aviation Administration of China (CAAC) in March 2025.

== Aircraft ==
=== Ghost ===
Ghost is a quadcopter developed by Ehang in a typical quadrotor layout with a pair of skids as landing gear. However, Ghost has an unusual feature: the rotors are mounted below the tips of the arms, instead of being mounted on top of the tips of the arms like most other multirotors. Ghost is mainly intended for aerial photography missions, and it is controlled by a smartphone. Its complete name is Ghost Intelligent Aerial Robot (Chinese: Ghost智能空中机器人; pinyin: Ghost zhìnéng kōngzhōng jīqìrén).

Data from mobile geeks

General characteristics

- Wingspan: 0.35 m (1 ft 2 in)
- Gross weight: 0.68 kg (1 lb)
- Propellers: 4-bladed

Performance

- Maximum speed: 60 km/h (37 mph, 32 kn)
- Endurance: 25 min
- Service ceiling: 914 m (2,999 ft)
- Rate of climb: 2.5 m/s (490 ft/min)

=== Hexacopter ===
Ehang Hexacopter is a UAV developed by Ehang and it has not yet been named. The existence of this hexacopter was revealed for the first time to the public when it made its public debut in August 2014 at TechCrunch Beijing. The yet-to-be-named hexacopter is constructed of carbon fiber composite material with a pair of skids as landing gear. The arms of this hexacopter are curved, as opposed to the straight arms of most multi-rotors currently on the market. The hexacopter is controlled by laptop computer.

Data from engadget

General characteristics

- Capacity: 10 kg
- Propellers: 6-bladed

Performance

- Range: 5.0 km (3.1 mi, 2.7 nmi)
- Endurance: 30 - 40 min

=== EHang 184 ===
EHang 184
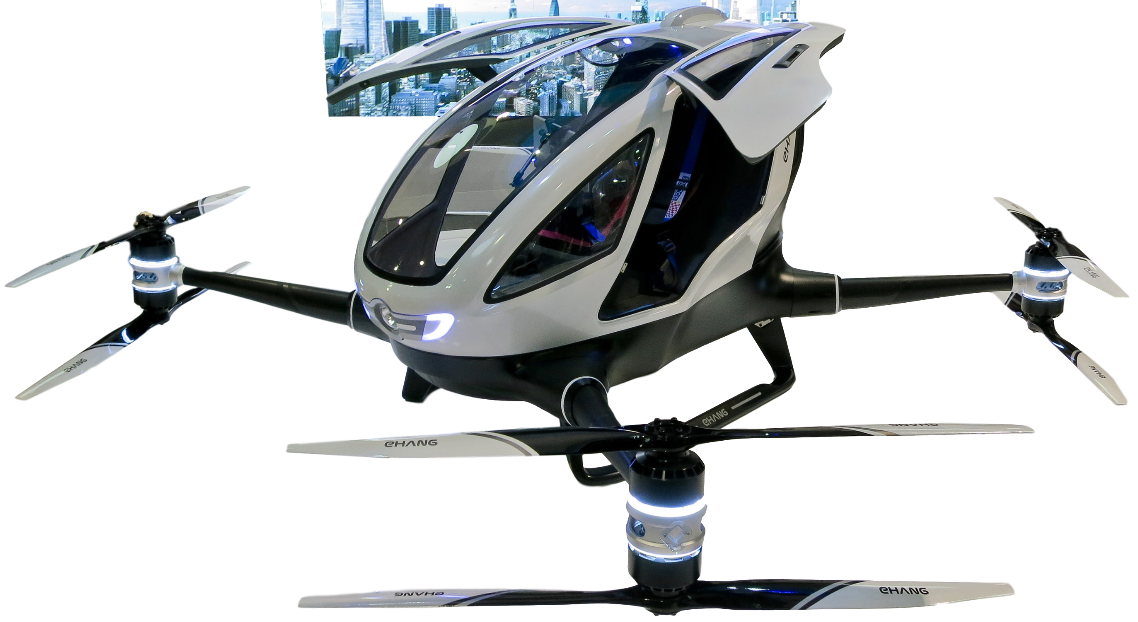
- Passenger drone

General information
- Type: Personal air vehicle PAV
- National origin: China
- Manufacturer: EHang
- Designer: EHang Holdings Limited
- Status: Unknown
- Primary user: China

History
- Introduction date: 2014
- First flight: 2016

The EHang 184 is an autonomous passenger drone capable of reaching over 62 mph (100 km/h). EHang says it started carrying passengers in 2015 and since made 40 journeys till releasing footage in February 2018. In three years, more than 1,000 test flights were conducted, including some "violent" ones with dummies, in storm-force winds, in low visibility, at night and 1,000 ft (300 m) above the ground. It has eight propellers on four arms and by July 2018, 30 to 40 single pilot EHang 184 have been built.

Data from Electric VTOL News and AEROSPACE TECHNOLOGY

General characteristics

- Crew: None (self-piloted)
- Capacity: 1 passenger
- Length: 3.86 m (12 ft 8 in)
- Wingspan: 5.5 m (18 ft 1 in)
- Height: 1.44 m (4 ft 9 in)
- Propellers: 8 2-bladed fixed pitch

Performance

- Cruise speed: 130 km/h (81 mph, 70 kn)
- Range: 16 km (9.9 mi, 8.6 nmi)
- Service ceiling: 500 m (1,600 ft)

=== EHang 216 ===
The 216 is a two-seater with 16 propellers in a coaxial double-baled design. It made over 1,000 manned flights by July 2018 and its maximum trip length was 8.8 km (5.5 miles). It could fly 25 min for a range of 30–40 km (16–22 nmi). The aircraft is targeted for autonomous flying, to be monitored from an EHang or its customer command-and-control center. Austrian aerostructures supplier FACC AG partnered with EHang to certify and produce the aircraft in Europe, within simpler certification requirements for takeoff weights below 600 kg (1,320 lb).

In October 2018, the CAAC approved initial passenger operations at specific locations to develop urban air taxis regulations. EHang began taking preorders since, for island-hopping and to a Chinese coastal resort for aerial sightseeing within their site. A 1 km (0.54 nmi) shuttle across the river of its home city of Guangzhou should avoid a 30 min drive due to traffic congestion on the downtown bridge. US biotechnology company United Therapeutics, manufacturing organs for human transplants, should test rapid automated delivery from laboratory to hospital by the end of 2019.

In March 2020, the Norwegian Civil Aviation Authority issued a permit for manned test and certification flights. It is the first such approval in Europe.

On May 27, 2020, EHang obtained the world's first commercial pilot operation approval from the Civil Aviation Administration of China (“CAAC”) to use EHang 216 passenger-grade AAVs for air logistics purpose. The EHang 216 received a special flight operations certificate (SFOC) from Transport Canada Civil Aviation (TCCA) for test flights in Québec, Canada.

=== Ehang 216-S ===
Data from Electric VTOL News

General characteristics

- Crew: Unpiloted
- Capacity: 2 passengers (260 kg)
- Length: 5.61 m (18 ft 5 in)
- Height: 1.76 m (5 ft 9 in)
- Propellers: 16-bladed

Performance

- Maximum speed: 130 km/h (81 mph, 70 kn)
- Cruise speed: 100 km/h (62 mph, 54 kn)
- Minimum control speed: 70 km/h (43 mph, 38 kn)
- Range: 35 km (22 mi, 19 nmi)Uses 5G wireless connectivity to communicate. Maximum altitude: 9,843 ft (3,000 m).21-minute flight time. Charge time: ~2 hours. Payload: 485 lb (220 kg).

==== Firefighting ====
The EHang 216F is a version designed for aerial firefighting, particularly in high-rise buildings. It has a maximum flight altitude of 600 meters and can carry up to 150 liters of fire extinguishing agent. Equipped with a camera, it can independently locate fires.

The pilotless aircraft navigates preset routes using 5G wireless connectivity to communicate with the command center. It can reach an altitude of 9,843 feet (3,000 meters), and its onboard batteries provide a range of 22 miles (35 kilometers) or a flight time of 21 minutes per charge. Recharging is reported to take approximately 2 hours. The payload capacity is said to be 485 pounds (220 kilograms). Passengers enter through gull-wing doors, and the eVTOL features fixed landing gear.

== See also ==
- Flying car (aircraft)
- List of unmanned aerial vehicles of the People's Republic of China
- List of electric aircraft
- Archer Aviation
- Horizon Aircraft
- Joby Aviation
- Lilium
- Vertical Aerospace
- Volocopter
- Wisk Aero
