= Passenger drone =

Autonomous aircraft designed to carry passengers

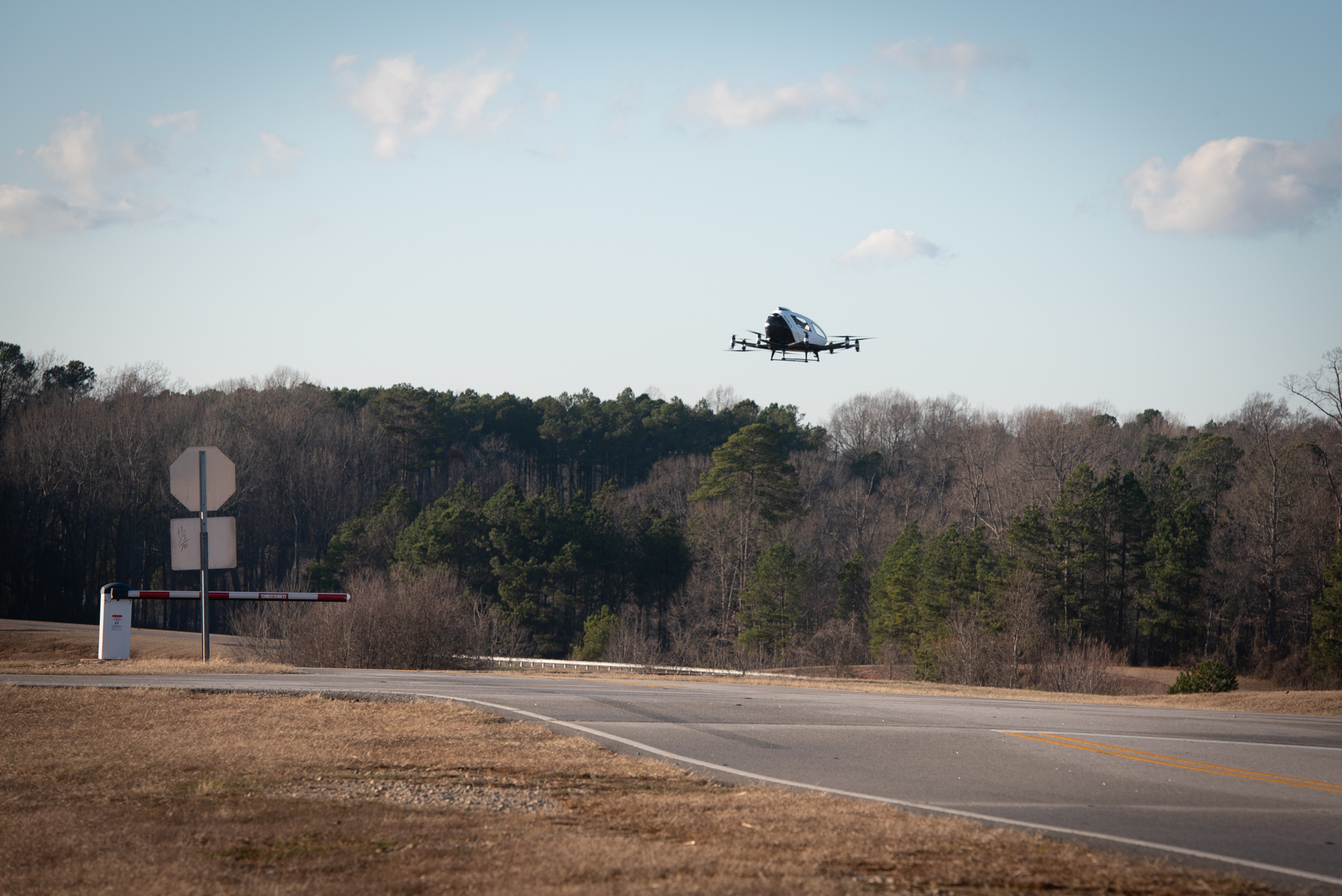
Ehang 184 passenger drone demonstration

A passenger drone is an autonomous aircraft that is designed to carry a small number of passengers to a destination.

In 2021, Ehang, a technology company based in Guangzhou, China, developed the Ehang 184, the world's first passenger drone.

== History ==
Unmanned aerial vehicles were first introduced in World War 1, when Britain first developed the Aerial Target, an aircraft controlled remotely through radio signals. A year later in the United States, testing of Kettering Bug, a 3.7-metre-long (12-foot) biplane attached with a bomb and that launched via a "slingshot-like rail", was also under progress. Both their unreliable test results and their possibility of endangering friendly troops in deployment caused neither aircraft to be used during the war. Production of UAVs continued after World War I and into World War II and the Vietnam War, where they would be invaluable in assisting with training as well as reconnaissance.

Late 20th century also saw the proposition and development of unique methods of travel, including personal jetpacks and even flying cars. While the previously mentioned are not drones, they serve as a precursor and foundation for the passenger drones of today.

The first passenger drone was unveiled on 6 January 2016 at the international Consumer Electronics Show (CES) in Las Vegas. Produced by Ehang, a Chinese company based in Guangzhou, the 184 was a one passenger drone equipped with four propellers that could fly for approximately 23 minutes at a top speed of 101 km/h (63 mph). Since then, many new companies have entered the market, but none yet have been accessible by the public.

== Technological development ==
Since 2013, improvements in designs to wing structures have contributed to the economic feasibility of passenger drones. New structural advancements, such as the flapping-wing propulsion system based on the mechanisms of birds’ wings, are more available as they have proven their capabilities in laboratory testing. As of 29 September 2015, most market-ready drones are delivery drones with a carrying capacity limited to small packages – with a typical maximum capacity of under 2.3 kg (5 pounds).

However, while the technology exists for drones with larger carrying capacities, specifically those capable of carrying multiple humans, the execution of this technology is not yet market accessible. This capacity limit must be addressed for passenger drones; given current designs strive to carry a maximum of 5 people. However, some estimates believe that passengers drones could become a reality, specifically for paid transportation and emergency purposes, as early as 2026. With implementation of this technology, there could be significant effects on ground traffic including reducing gridlock in heavily congested areas and conserving up to 15% of the fuel currently used in heavy traffic patterns.

However, extensive growth of the passenger drone market also risks clouding the low-altitude airspace and causing new safety risks. However, this concern is being addressed by recent advancements in the Internet of Drones (IoD) which links drones together to ensure appropriate pathing and reduce mid-air collisions. While this brings additional security issues, including maintaining reliable communication channels in the case of technological failure, researchers hope that this will help reduce crashes that can result in damage to passengers, buildings, and people in and around the airspace.

== Notable companies ==
Ehang is a Chinese company that has developed numerous drones including passenger plane Ehang 184. EHang 184 was their first model, developed as an eight dual rotor wing blade drone that can carry two passengers. The model was retired in 2020 and is replaced by the Ehang 216. Ehang also released a one passenger drone, Ehang 116. Ehang in 2021 unveiled the model VT-30. VT-30 is designed to have eight dual rotor wing blades to complement its fixed wing platform.

Flyastro, a Texas-based drone company, developed the Astro ALTA, with two and four person passenger models. The company is known for being the first to develop a solar-powered airplane. The development team initially began with the model, Elroy. It was a two passenger drone with similar design to the ALTA. Once flight was achieved, the model Astro ALTA began development.

Joby Aviation is a California based company that has developed a five passenger drone, with one seat for the pilot. The company expects to complete its FAA certification process 2022. Joby in 2020 acquired a 75 million dollar investment from service provider Uber Technologies Inc., leading to Uber Elevate and Expands partnership.

Archer Aviation is a California-based company that has developed a two passenger model called Maker. It has fixed wings with twelve rotor wings. Archer is developing five person model. United Airlines has partnered with Archer for commercial sale of the model, Maker. Maker is expected to be released within Los Angeles and Miami by 2024.

CityAirbus is a drone project developed by Airbus, a European multinational aerospace company, based in the Netherlands. CityAirbus has developed a four- person passenger drone with fixed wings that include rotor wing blades. Its expected certification for public flight is in 2025.

Boeing, an American multinational aviation corporation is developing a passenger drone model called the Passenger Air Vehicle (PAV). The model is a fixed wing with eight rotor blade wings attached onto a platform underneath the base structure. The model can hold two passengers and is still in development.

Volocopter is a German aircraft manufacturer that is developing a passenger drone called Volocity. The model consists of eighteen rotor wings above the cockpit on a circular ring. Japan Airlines, an investor of Volocopter planned to have a public test in Japan as early as 2023.

== Future use ==
=== Potential benefits ===
Passenger drones can greatly reduce the time for travel. As passenger drones flight paths are not restricted by conventional roads, the travel distance is shortened. Current ventures such as Joby Aviation, after acquiring Uber Air, plan to take advantage of this technology in the form of air taxis. Other potential benefits include the use of passenger drones by emergency services such as search and rescue missions and the delivery of life saving goods. Companies like Ehang have already begun using passenger drones as emergency vehicles as a response to the potential river collapses during the flood season in China.

=== Concerns ===
Passenger and air traffic safety remains at the forefront of concerns. Regulations for air traffic centered around passenger drones are still underway and would continue to develop with increasing use cases for passenger drones. Remote security threats on commercial drones such as Man-In-The-Middle (MITM) attack have also exposed the vulnerabilities in current drone systems. Among American adults, 54 percent say that they would feel unsafe flying inside a passenger drone. Passenger drones can be very noisy; a single passenger drone such as Joby Aviation’s all-electric vertical take-off and landing (“eVTOL”) aircraft has an estimated noise production of 70 dB, a noise level equating to “loud traffic”.

== See also ==
- Index of aviation articles
- eVTOL – Type of aircraft
- Flying platform – Class of VTOL aircraft
- Personal air vehicle – Type of aircraft
