= Volocopter VoloRegion =

Proposed personal air vehicle

VoloRegion
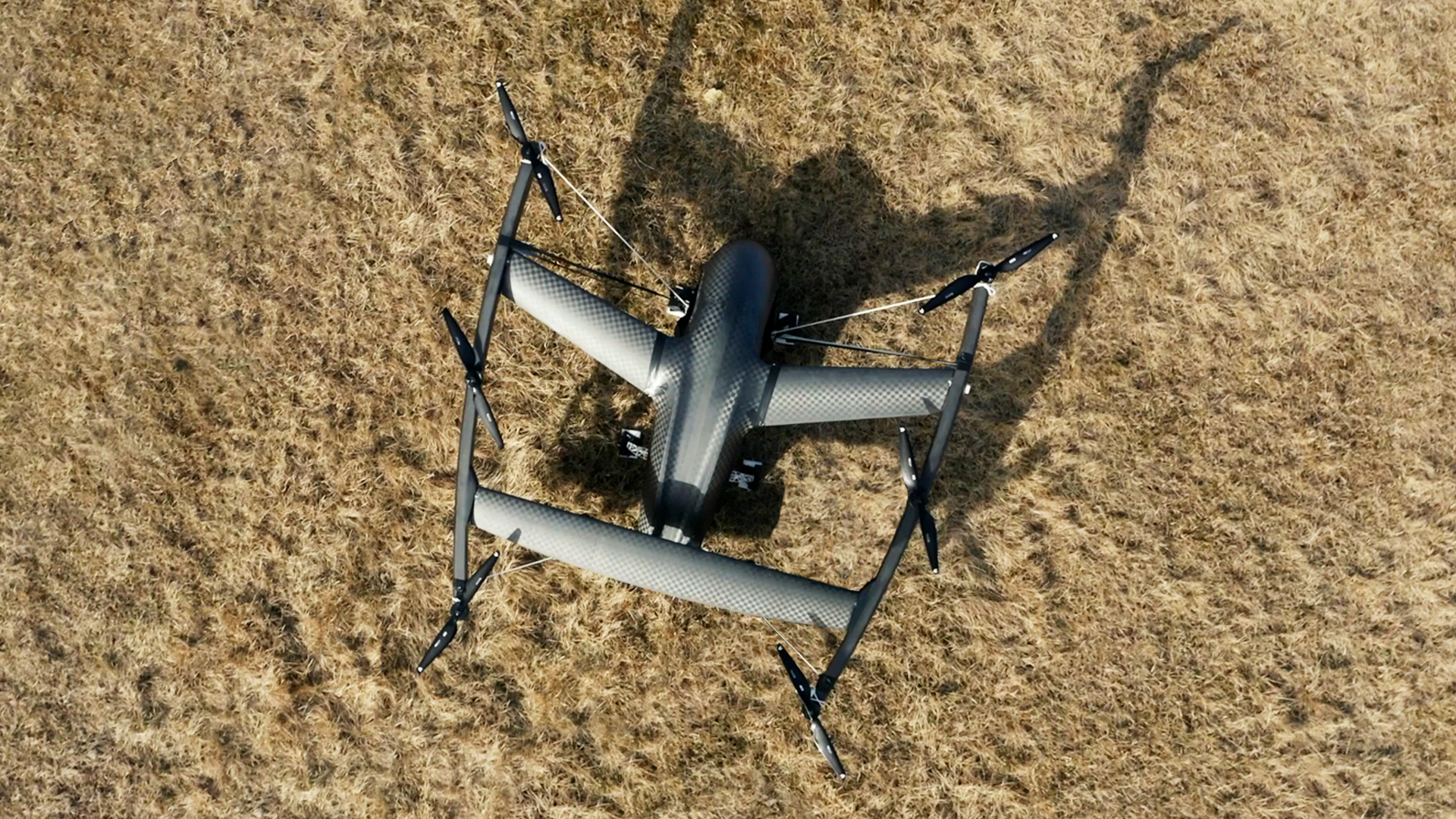
- model 2021

General information
- Type: eVTOL
- National origin: Germany
- Manufacturer: Volocopter GmbH
- Status: Under development

History
- Introduction date: Planned for 2026

The VoloRegion is an electrically powered aircraft that can take off and land vertically (eVTOL). It is being developed by the German company Volocopter.

== History ==
The concept of the VoloConnect was presented first on May 17, 2021 at the EBACE Connect conference. The prototype was developed within two years in Munich under the direction of chief engineer Sebastian Mores. So far, only scaled-down prototypes have been tested in flight. The certification SC VTOL enhanced (10^{−9}) shall be reached within the next 5 years. The VoloRegion will be linked to the Volocopter software platform VoloIQ. In cooperation with Fraport, take-off and landing areas are planned which are necessary for the implementation of the urban air mobility concept. In October 2022 the VoloConnect was renamed and is now called the VoloRegion.

== Design ==
The VoloRegion has a multi-rotor system. It uses a hybrid lift and push design with a purely electric drive. It's equipped with 8 individual motors, 6 of which are connected to free propellers generate the lift and two to ducted propellers providing the forward thrust. There is a main high-wing wing with two outriggers for the 6 VTOL propellers. The stern is V-shaped. The lift of the VoloRegion is not only generated by propellers, as is usual with Volocopter, but also with its wings. This is energetically better.

== Specifications ==
Data from VoloRegion / Electric VTOL News by the Vertical Flight Society

General characteristics

- Crew: None (autopilot)
- Capacity: 2 - 3 passengers, 300–400 kg (660–880 lb) payload
- Powerplant: 6 × Vertical Electric
- Powerplant: 2 × Horizontal Electric

Performance

- Maximum speed: 160 mph (250 km/h, 130 kn)
- Cruise speed: 110 mph (180 km/h, 97 kn)
- Range: 62 mi (100 km, 54 nmi)

== Usage ==
The VoloRegion is designed for short range personal transport, it's connecting the suburbs to cities.

== See also ==
- List of rotorcraft
- Air taxi
- Boeing Passenger Air Vehicle
- Wisk Cora
