= NSTS =

NSTS is a four-letter abbreviation which may refer to:

- The National Space Transportation System, known usually as the Space Shuttle program
- National STandard Scenario, special flight plans for multirotors and other small airships.
- The National Talent Search Examination, an Indian scholarship program.
