= Volocopter Technologies =

German Air Mobility Company

Volocopter Technologies GmbH
- Type: Privately held company
- Industry: Aerospace, Advanced Air Mobility
- Founded: 2011; 15 years ago
- Founders: Alexander Zosel; Stephan Wolf
- Headquarters: Bruchsal, Baden-Württemberg, Germany
- Key people: Dieter Zetsche (CEO); Stefan Klocke (Chairman)
- Products: Electric VTOL aircraft
- Website: www.volocopter.com

Volocopter Technologies GmbH (formerly called E-Volo GmbH then Volocopter GmbH) is a German aircraft manufacturer based in Bruchsal (near Karlsruhe) and founded by Alexander Zosel and Stephan Wolf. The company specializes in the design of electric multirotor helicopters in the form of personal air vehicles, designed for air taxi use. The CEO is Dieter Zetsche.

== History ==
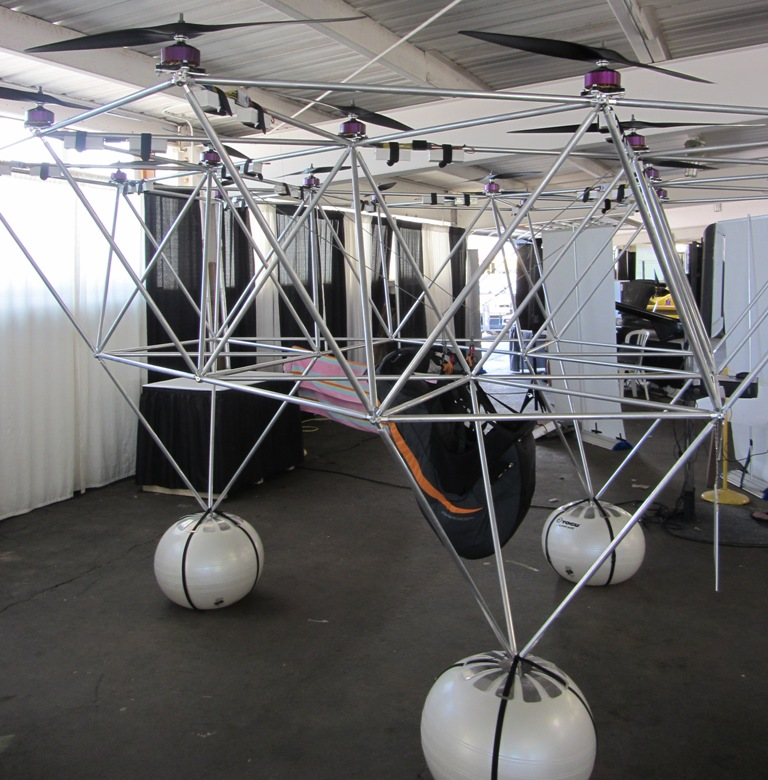
Volocopter VC2

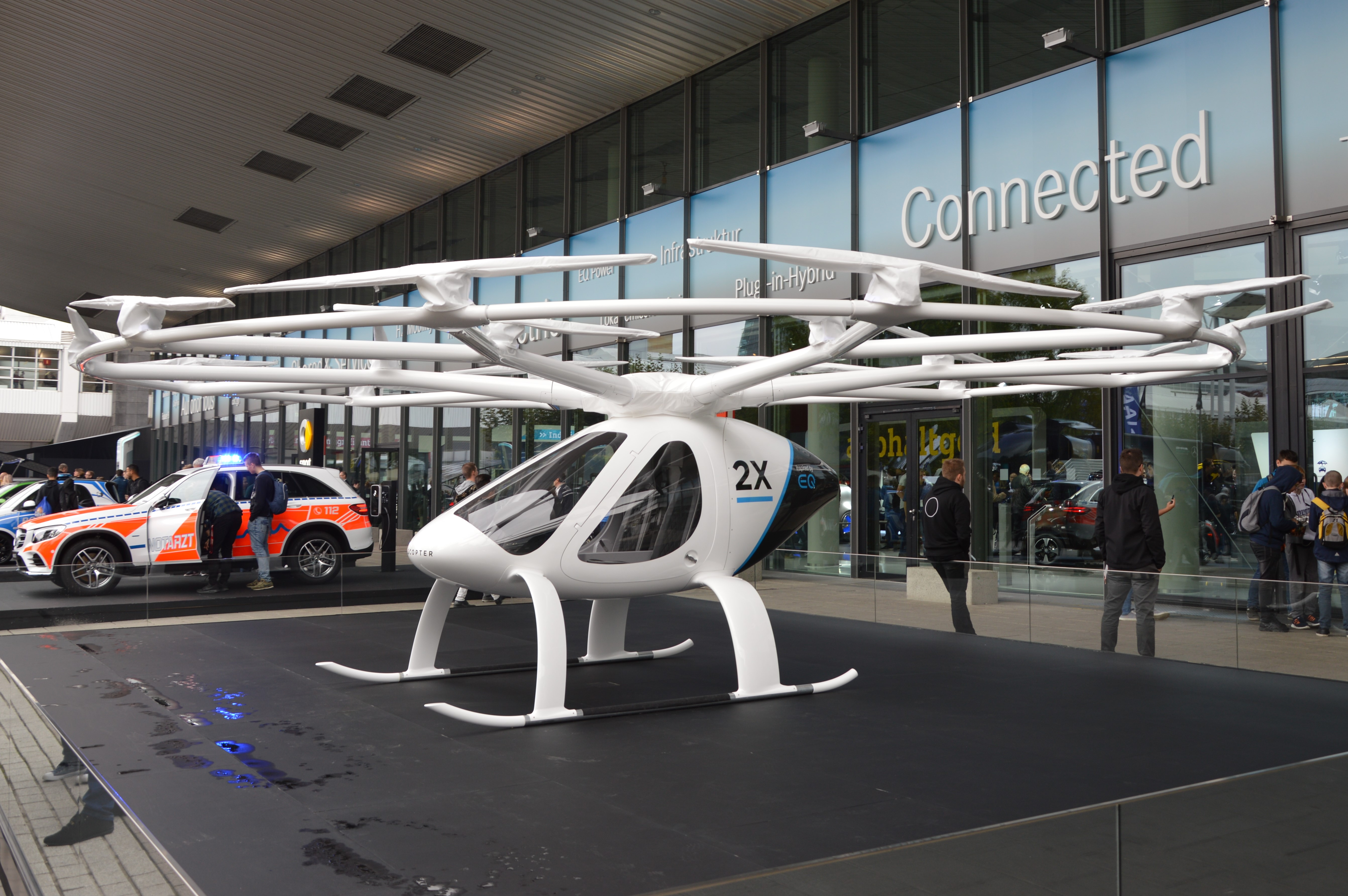
Volocopter 2X

The company flew the Volocopter VC1 and Volocopter VC2 technology demonstrators, followed by the two-seat Volocopter VC200 prototype. The VC1 was first flown on 21 October 2011.

The two-seat project that became the Volocopter 2X started in 2013, evolved from early single-seat Volocopter VC2 prototype flown in 2011. The two seat prototype was designated as the VC-200 and the derived production model the 2X.

An on-line fundraising effort in 2013 on the Seedmatch website raised €500,000 in 2 hours and 35 minutes, setting a new European Union record. The money was used to build the VC200 prototype.

The aircraft entered serial production in April 2018 and will be built under contract by the German sailplane manufacturer DG Flugzeugbau.

On 9 September 2019, Geely, which is also the parent company of Volvo Cars, Terrafugia and Lotus Cars, led a round of funding that raised $55 million in private investments for Volocopter. In September 2020, Volocopter started flying pre-sales promotional trips for Volocity, the company's prospective electric air taxi service.

On 21 October 2019, Volocopter unveiled its "world first air taxi airport", and the company also demonstrated the use of its VoloCity eVTOL aircraft around the Marina Bay vicinity of southern Singapore. The company also conducted a feasibility survey with Singaporean mega ride-hailing company Grab. The demonstration was well-received and supported by the Singapore government. The company worked closely together with various government authorities like MoT, CAAS and EDB to allow test flights for their 'air taxi' service in the area and to fly its first proposed flight route to Sentosa. The demonstration also shed light to promote greater public visibility on the new transportation service to come in the next few years. There was extensive media coverage of the flight testing and the demonstrator vertical airport that Skyports built in collaboration with Volocopter within the Marina Bay area in Singapore, and attracted many people to witness the test flight even though the weather was a little gloomy then. The eVTOL prototype airport is called the "Voloport". After the demonstration, the prototype was dismantled, and moved for redeployment at subsequent launches. However, by Nov 2023, it was announced that the launch of Volocopter's air taxi operations in Singapore had been put on hold indefinitely, due to lack of ability to secure local partners who can share the burden of funding the technology involved.

In January 2021, the company confirmed that the ADAC had reserved two of its VoloCity aircraft for operational testing in 2023.

Also in January 2021, the company announced that the FAA had accepted its application to concurrently validate the European Union Aviation Safety Agency type certification it expects secure within the next three years. In the same announcement, the company claimed it was exploring launching Volocity within the United States to provide intra-city air taxi services in major metropolitan areas such as New York, Los Angeles, San Francisco, and Washington, DC.

In 2022, Volocopter raised $170 million in funding to launch its first air taxi services.

In October 2022 demonstration flights were performed also in Italy, in a temporary vertiport near Rome Fiumicino airport, as preparation for an intended airtaxi service to downtown Rome during the 2025 Jubilee.

In 2023, VoloCity hoped it would be flying athletes for the 2024 Summer Olympics in Paris but that did not happen as it had not obtain the certification for the engine.

In September 2023, the Bristow Group announced that it had ordered two Volocopter VoloCity eVTOLs with an option to purchase 78 more. The helicopter company plans use the VoloCitys to establish a commercial passenger and cargo service in the US and UK.

On November 13, 2023, the company flew its Volocopter 2X in New York, marking the aircraft's first flight in the city. The demonstration took place at the Downtown Manhattan Heliport (DMH) as part of an announcement by the city of its intention to electrify the facility.

On 30 December 2024, Volocopter filed for insolvency as the company was unable to maintain proper funding to continue operations. The company will remain in operation during the proceedings.

== Products ==
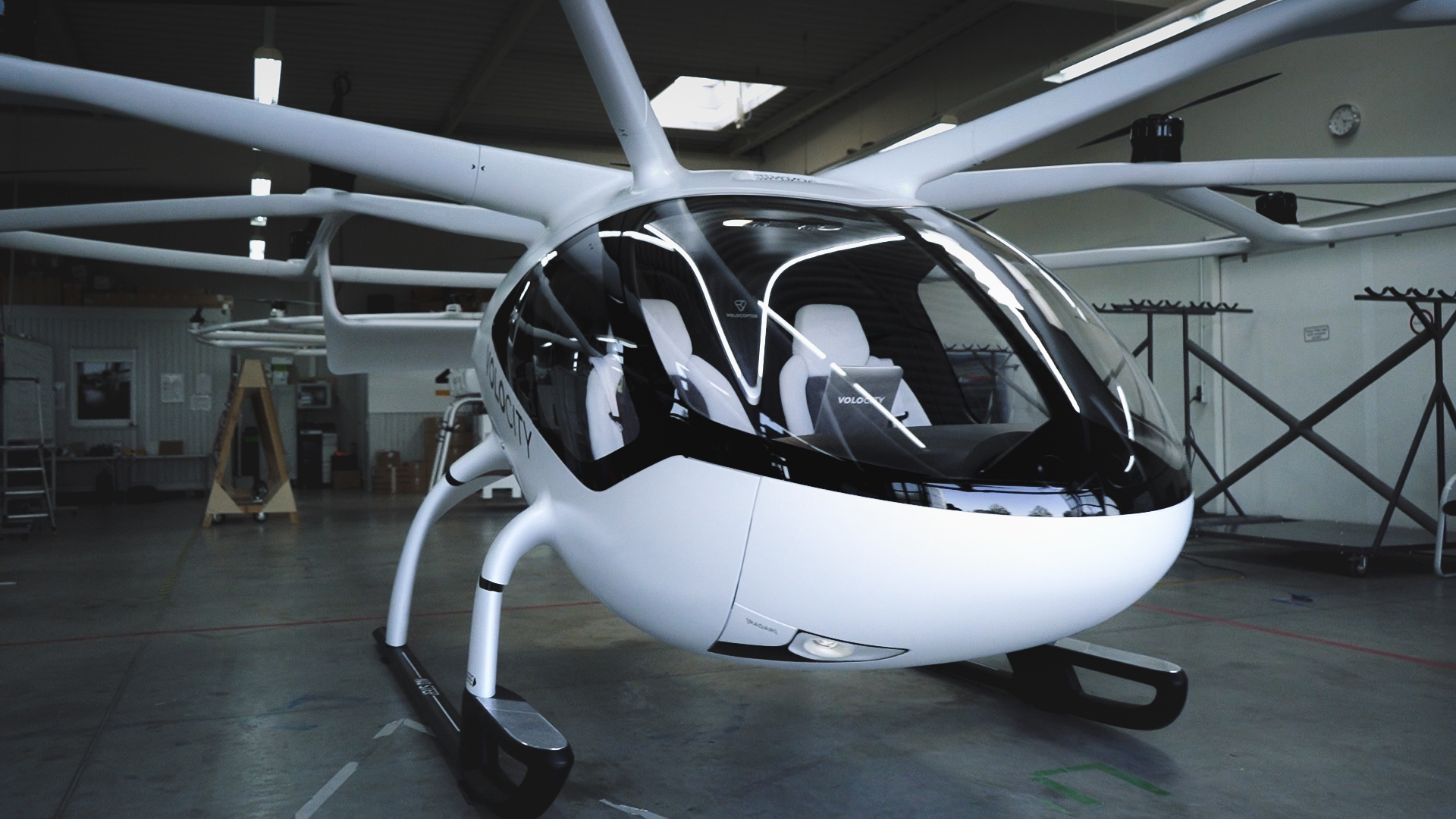
VoloCity

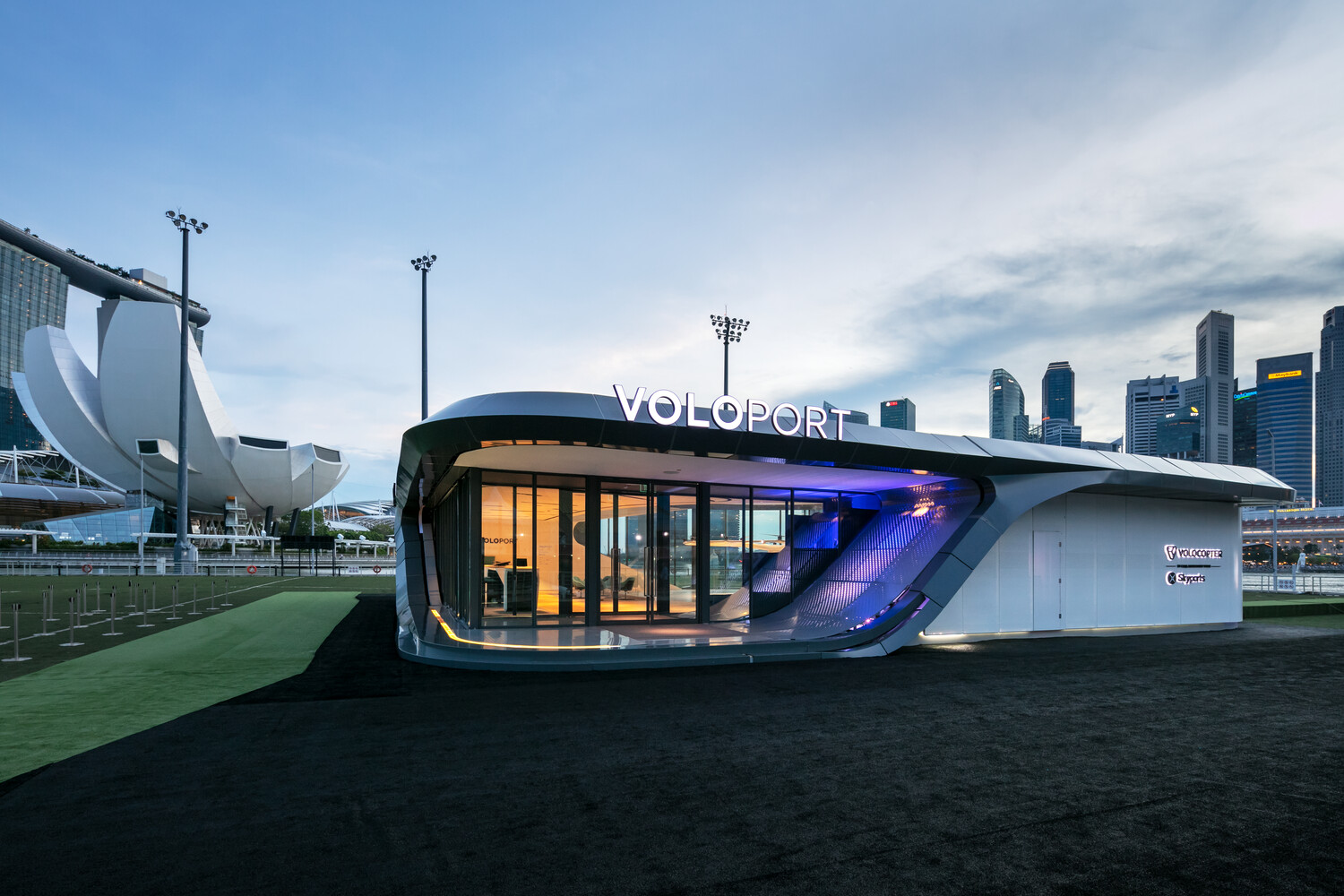
VoloPort

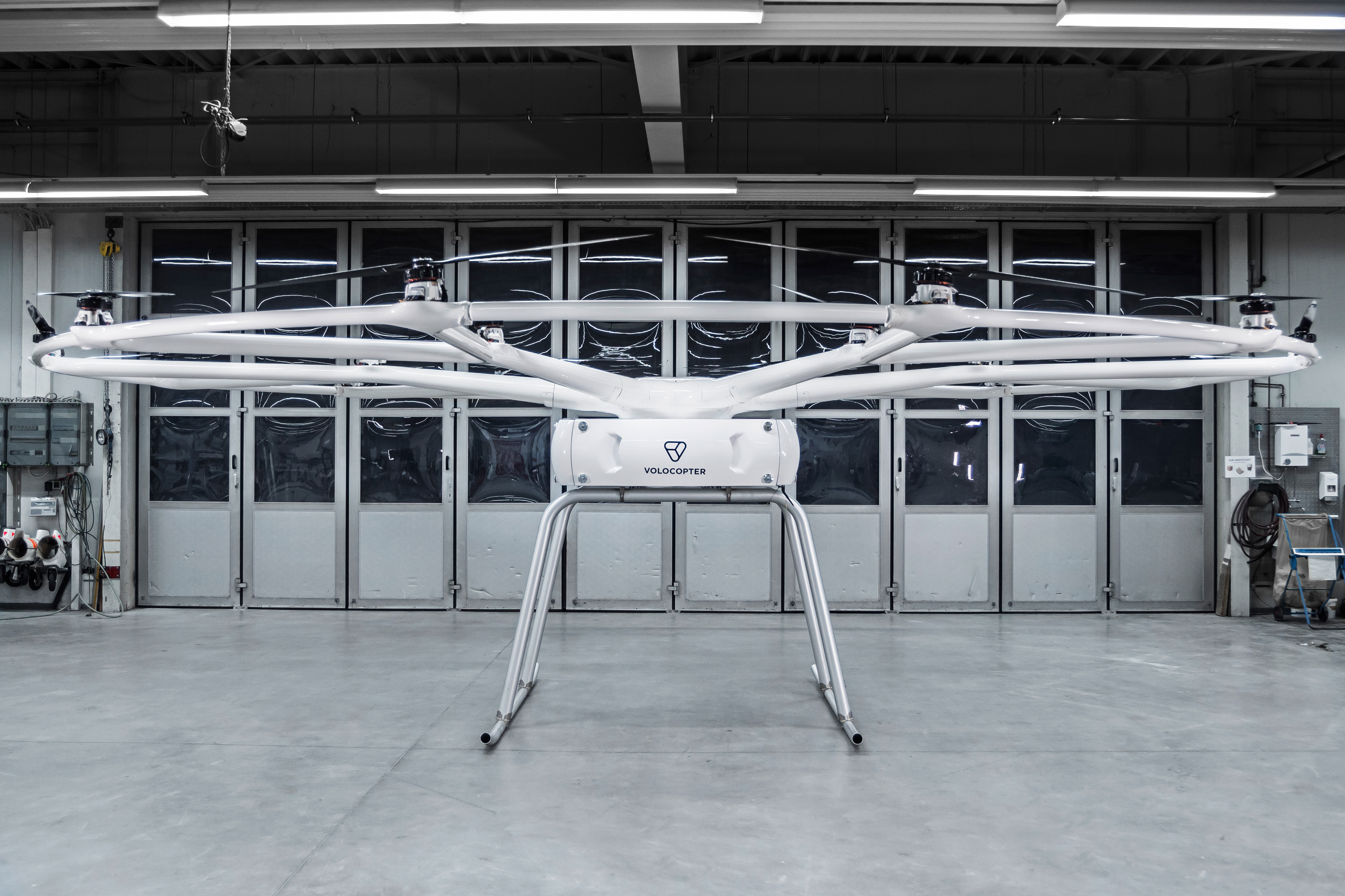
VoloDrone

Summary of all products designed and built by Volocopter GmbH:

eVTOL aircraft

- Volocopter VC1 (prototype)
- Volocopter VC2 (prototype)
- Volocopter VC200 (prototype)
- Volocopter 2X (prototype)
- Volocopter Volocity (2021 two-seater eVTOL aircraft)
- Volocopter VoloRegion (2021 announced new eVTOL aircraft)

Vertical take off and landings eVTOL aircraft specialised airport

- VoloPort

Drones

- Volodrone

Digital products

- VoloIQ

== Research ==
At the EfeuCampus in Bruchsal, Volocopter is testing with partners such as KIT, SEW Eurodrive or Schenker on emission free and autonomous for urban freight logistics. The Living lab is funded by the European Union and the state Baden-Württemberg.

== See also ==
- Air taxi
- Flying car (aircraft)
- List of electric aircraft
- Passenger drone
