= Volocopter Volocity =

Proposed personal air vehicle

VoloCity
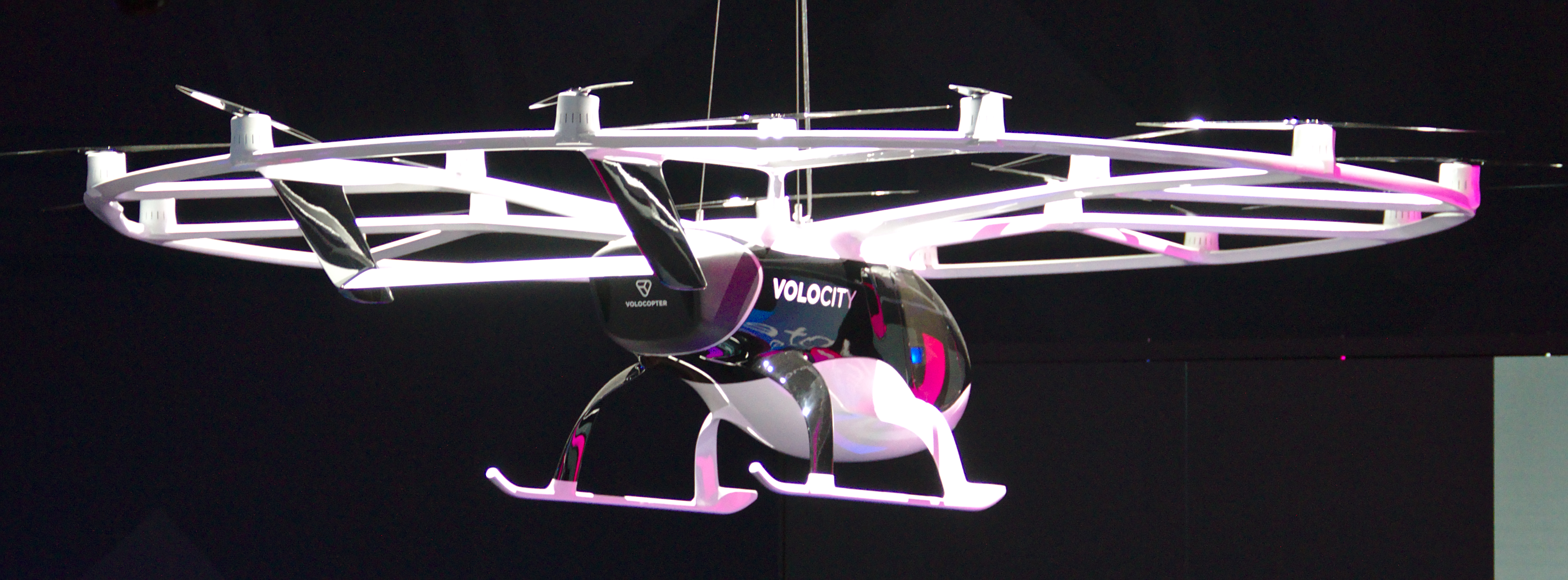
- model 2021

General information
- Type: eVTOL
- National origin: Germany
- Manufacturer: Volocopter GmbH
- Status: Under development

History
- Introduction date: Planned for 2024

The VoloCity is an electrically powered aircraft that can fly autonomously and take off and land vertically. It is produced by the German manufacturer Volocopter and is its first series model.

== History ==
The VoloCity, Volocopter is the fourth generation and first series model of its flying machine after the Volocopter VC200 / 2X. It is equipped with two vertical stabilisers to keep the flight direction more stable. The device is aligned with the SC-VTOL regulations published by EASA in July 2019. In June 2021, the model 2X performed a three-minute flight at Le Bourget. From September 2021, the VoloCity will be tested in Pontoise near Paris for possible use during the 2024 Olympic Games. An uncrewed one-minute remote-controlled maiden flight of the VoloCity production version in December 2021 was followed by the first crewed flight on 13 April 2022.

== Design ==
The VoloCity is equipped with 18 individual motors. The goal of the development in January 2013 was a certifiable two-seat Volocopter, based on the VC Evolution 2P concept study. The VC200 and 2X models are equipped with a total rescue system, which is a first for helicopters. In normal helicopters and gyrocopters (autogyros), the way up is blocked by the main rotor and the use of a total rescue system is not possible. Previously, only Kamow helicopters could be rescued by jettisoning the two main rotors and then using an ejection seat. For maximum safety, all flight-critical systems are designed with multiple redundancy.

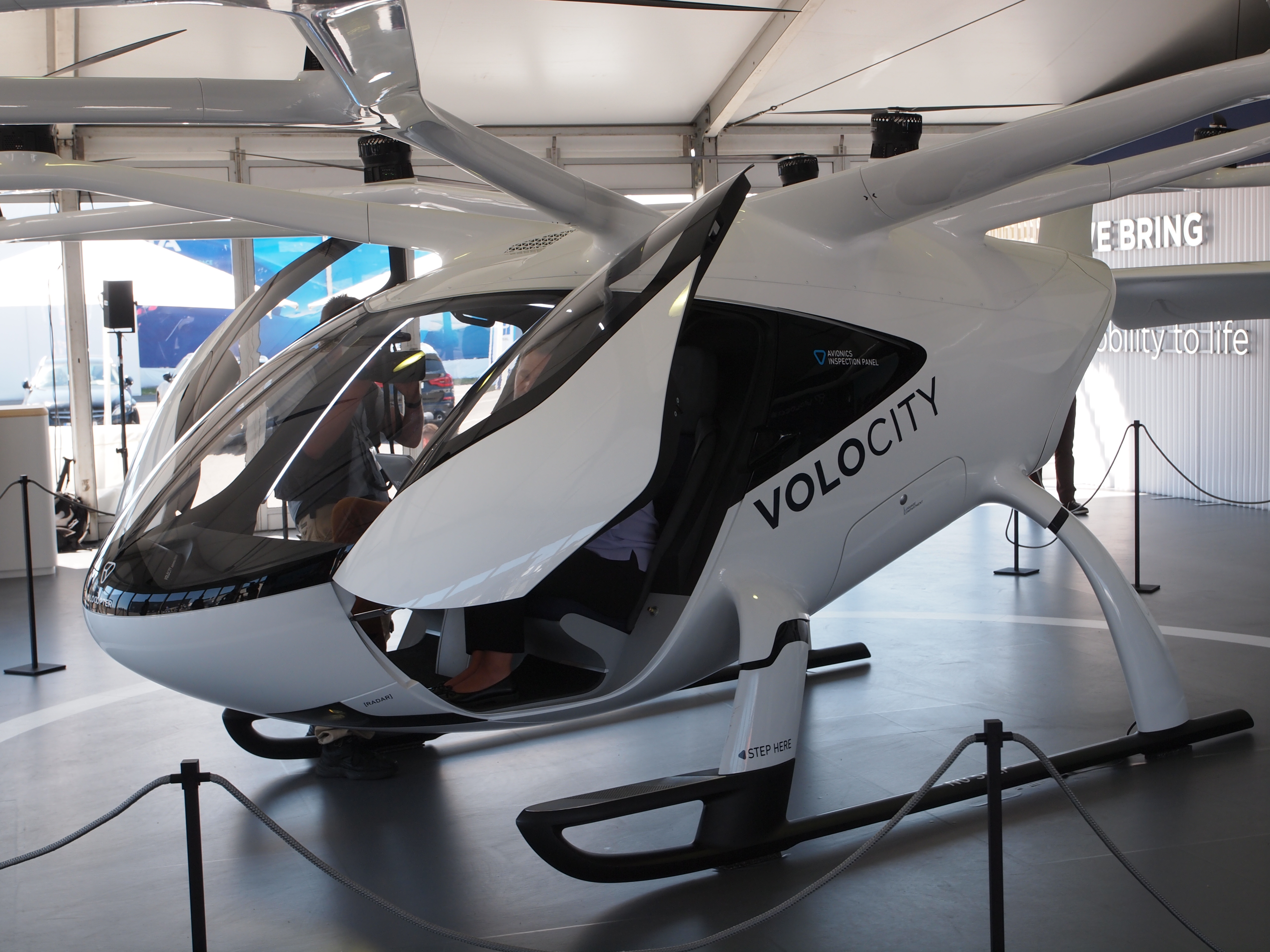
Volocity, ILA Berlin 2022

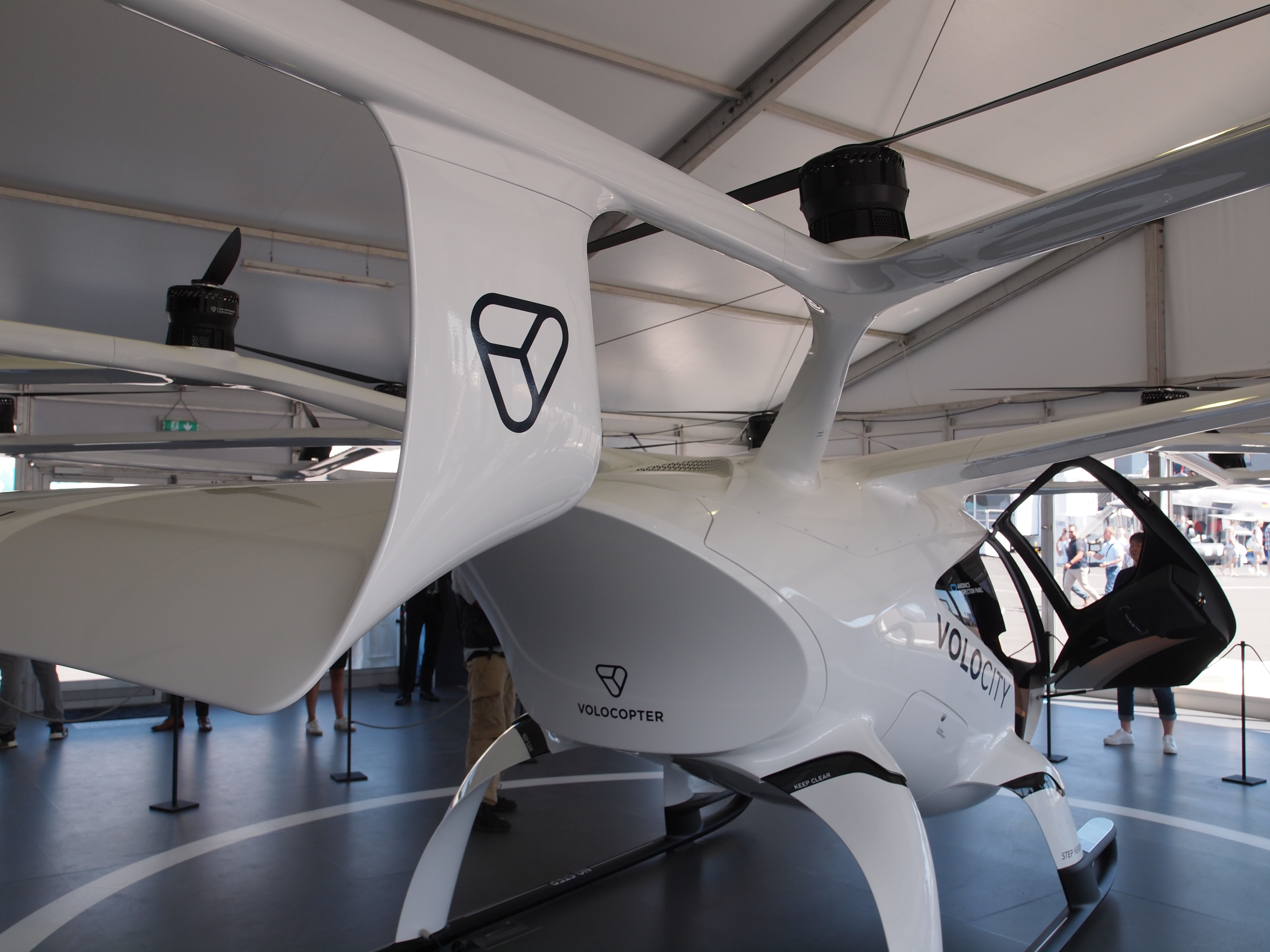
Volocity, back side

== Specifications ==
Data from VoloRegion / Electric VTOL News by the Vertical Flight Society

General characteristics

- Crew: 1 pilot / None (autopilot)
- Capacity: 1 passenger, 150–200 kg (330–440 lb) payload
- Length: 31 ft 2 in (9.5 m)
- Wingspan: 37 ft 1 in (11.3 m)
- Height: 8 ft 2 in (2.5 m)
- Empty weight: 1,543 lb (700 kg)
- Max takeoff weight: 1,984 lb (900 kg)
- Powerplant: 18 × Vertical Electric

Performance

- Maximum speed: 68 mph (110 km/h, 59 kn)
- Cruise speed: 62 mph (100 km/h, 54 kn)
- Range: 22 mi (35 km, 19 nmi)
- Service ceiling: 6,500 ft (1,980 m)

The first planned use is the introduction of an air taxi service in Singapore within the next three years. As the eVTOL air vehicle does not emit exhaust gases and the noise emissions are low, Volocopter wants to offer services especially in urban areas. It's to reduce congestion and complement urban mobility.

In an initial phase, the VoloCity will have a pilot on board. But, it is designed to fly fully autonomously. It's possible once the regulatory requirements for autonomous flight have been issued by the aviation authorities. In addition to passenger flight, Volocopter also sees the use for the VoloCity in air rescue. An initial study with ADAC Luftrettung, the operator of the largest fleet of rescue helicopters in Germany, concluded that the use of multicopters such as the VoloCity would be beneficial and could improve emergency care.

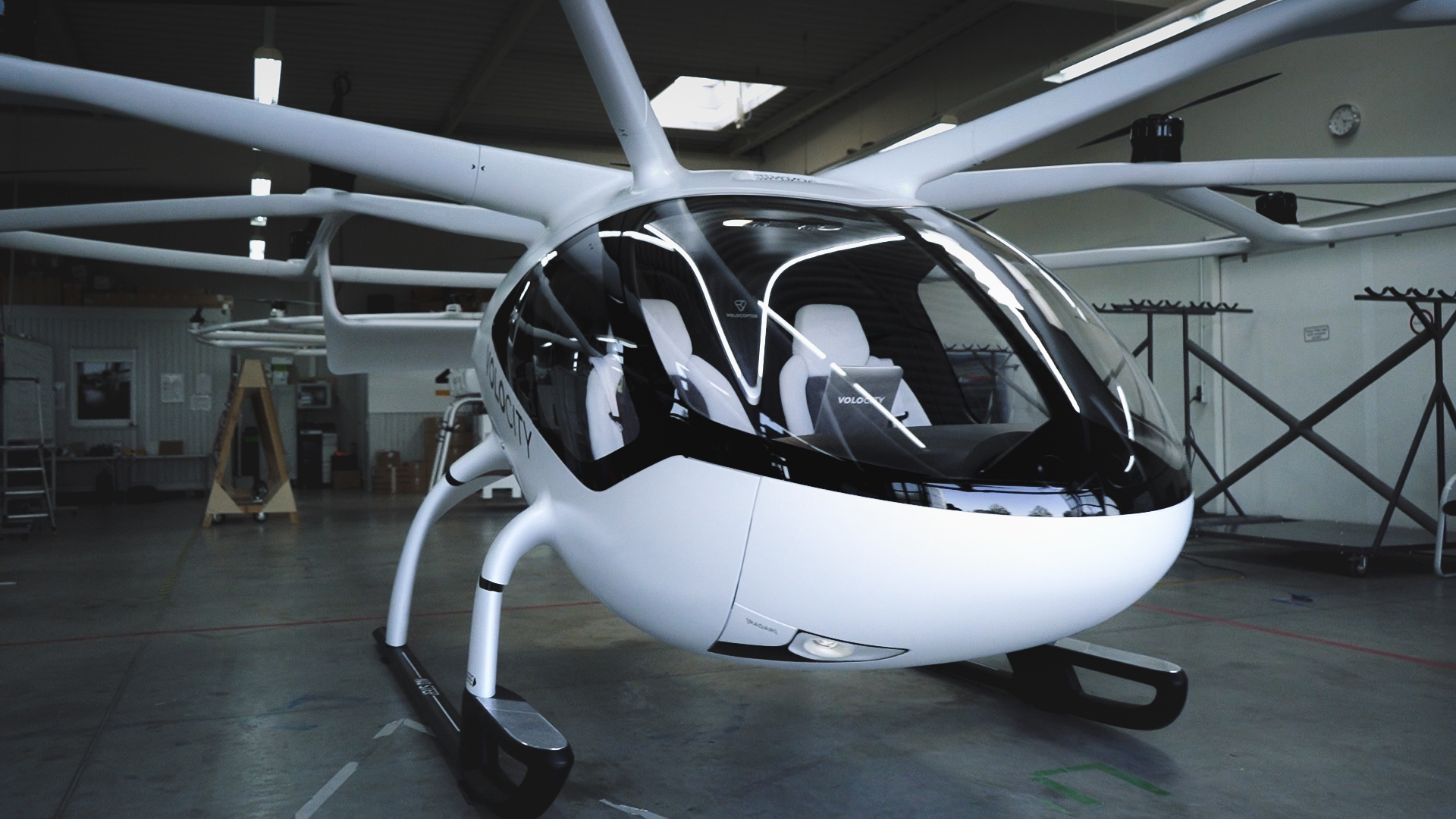
Volocity

== See also ==
- List of aircraft
