= Volocopter 2X =

German helicopter

2X
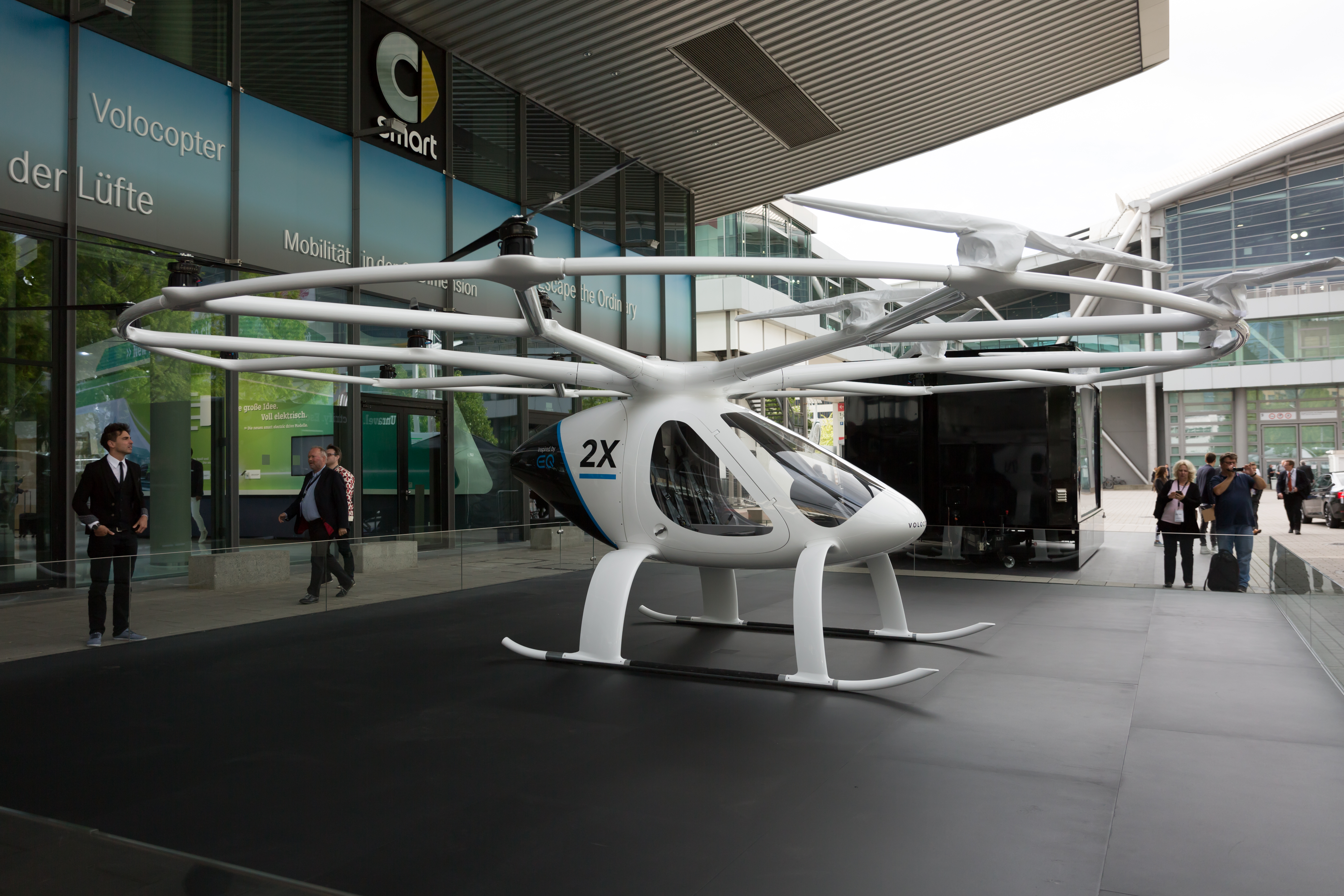

General information
- Type: Helicopter, personal air vehicle
- National origin: Germany
- Manufacturer: Volocopter
- Status: In production (2018)

History
- First flight: 17 November 2013
- Developed from: Volocopter VC2

The Volocopter 2X is a German two-seat, optionally-piloted, multirotor eVTOL aircraft. The personal air vehicle was designed and produced by Volocopter GmbH of Bruchsal, and first introduced at the AERO Friedrichshafen airshow in 2017. The aircraft is sold complete and ready-to-fly. Volocopter was formerly known as E-volo.

The design had its first flight on 17 November 2013.

== Development ==
The two-seat project started in 2013, evolved from early single-seat Volocopter VC2 prototype flown in 2011. The two seat prototype is the VC-200 and the derived production model the 2X.

An initial on-line fundraising effort in 2013 on Seedmatch raised €500,000 in 2 hours and 35 minutes, setting a new European Union record. The money was used to build the prototype, designated as the VC200.

The company received investments of €25M in 2017 to bring the design to production, including from Daimler AG.

A contract for serial production was placed with German sailplane manufacturer DG Flugzeugbau in April 2018.

== Design ==
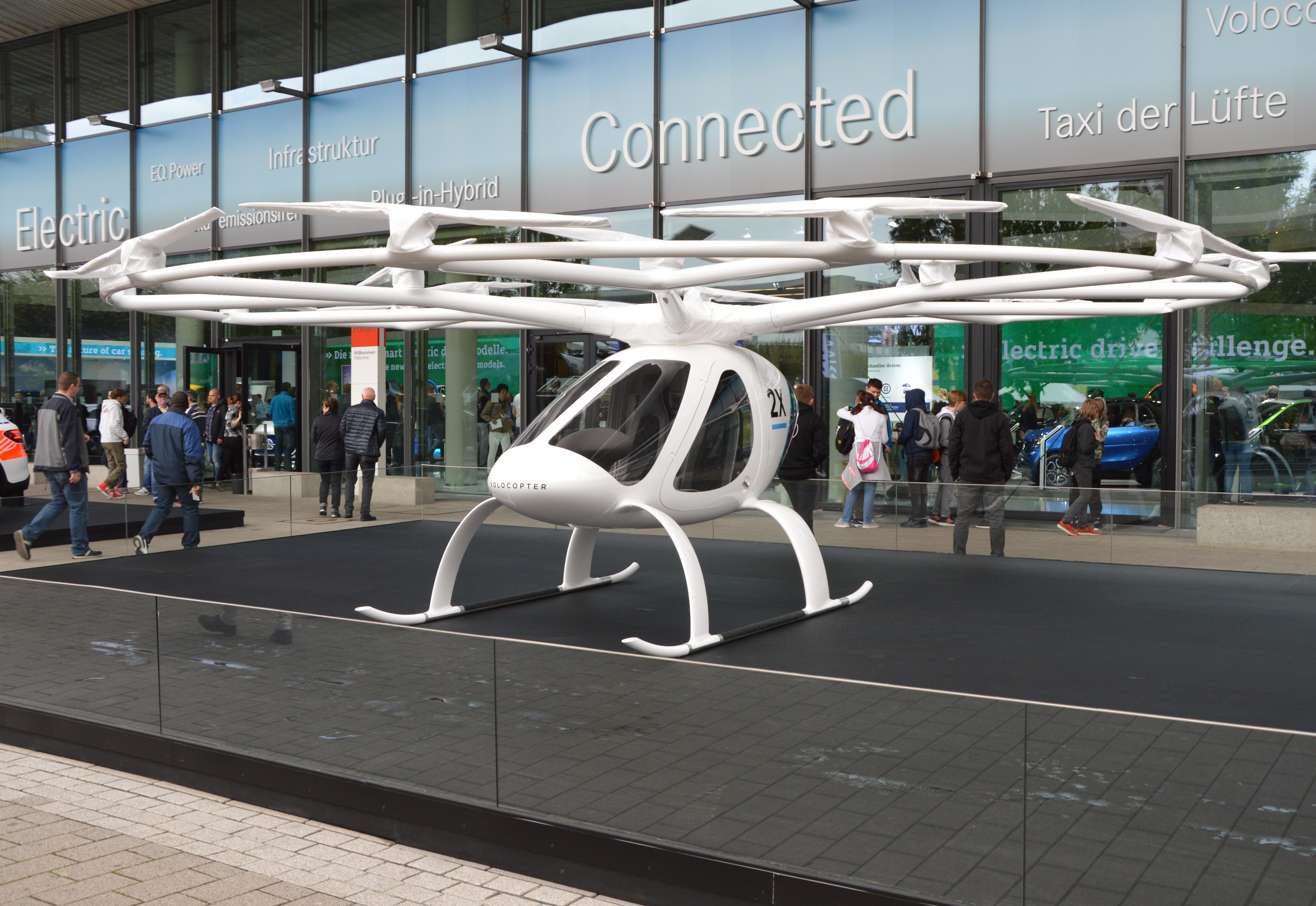
Volocopter 2X

The aircraft was designed to comply with the European Class 6 microlight helicopter rules and be employed in air taxi service in urban areas. It features 18 fixed-pitch propellers, each powered by its own electric motor. Accommodation is two-seats-in side-by-side configuration in an enclosed cockpit with a windshield. It uses skid landing gear.

The aircraft is made from carbon fibre composites. The controls operate through a mesh polymer fibre optic network fly-by-light system. The controls are a triple-redundant primary flight control unit, plus a dissimilar backup flight control unit and a joystick control. The stabilization system employs gyroscopes, acceleration sensors, magnetic field measurement sensors and manometers. Autonomous and remotely piloted control systems are under development.

The propellers are powered by three-phase PM synchronous brushless DC electric motors and are mounted on a spoked composite wheel mounted above the cabin. The motors are powered by nine independent quick-change lithium ion batteries, each one powering two motors. The batteries can be charged in 120 minutes normally or 40 minutes on quick-charge from the municipal power supply. The batteries use active air cooling. The propeller system can be dismantled for storage or ground transport. The propeller system has a diameter of 9.15 m (30.0 ft).

The aircraft has a typical empty weight of 290 kg (639 lb) and a gross weight of 450 kg (992 lb), giving a useful load of 160 kg (353 lb) for pilot, passenger and baggage. The aircraft includes a ballistic parachute.

The 2X has a service ceiling of 2,000 m (6,562 ft) and a hover ceiling of 1,650 m (5,413 ft). It produces an overflight noise level of 65 dB(A) at 75 m (246 ft) distance.

The aircraft's price has not been announced.

=== Test flying ===
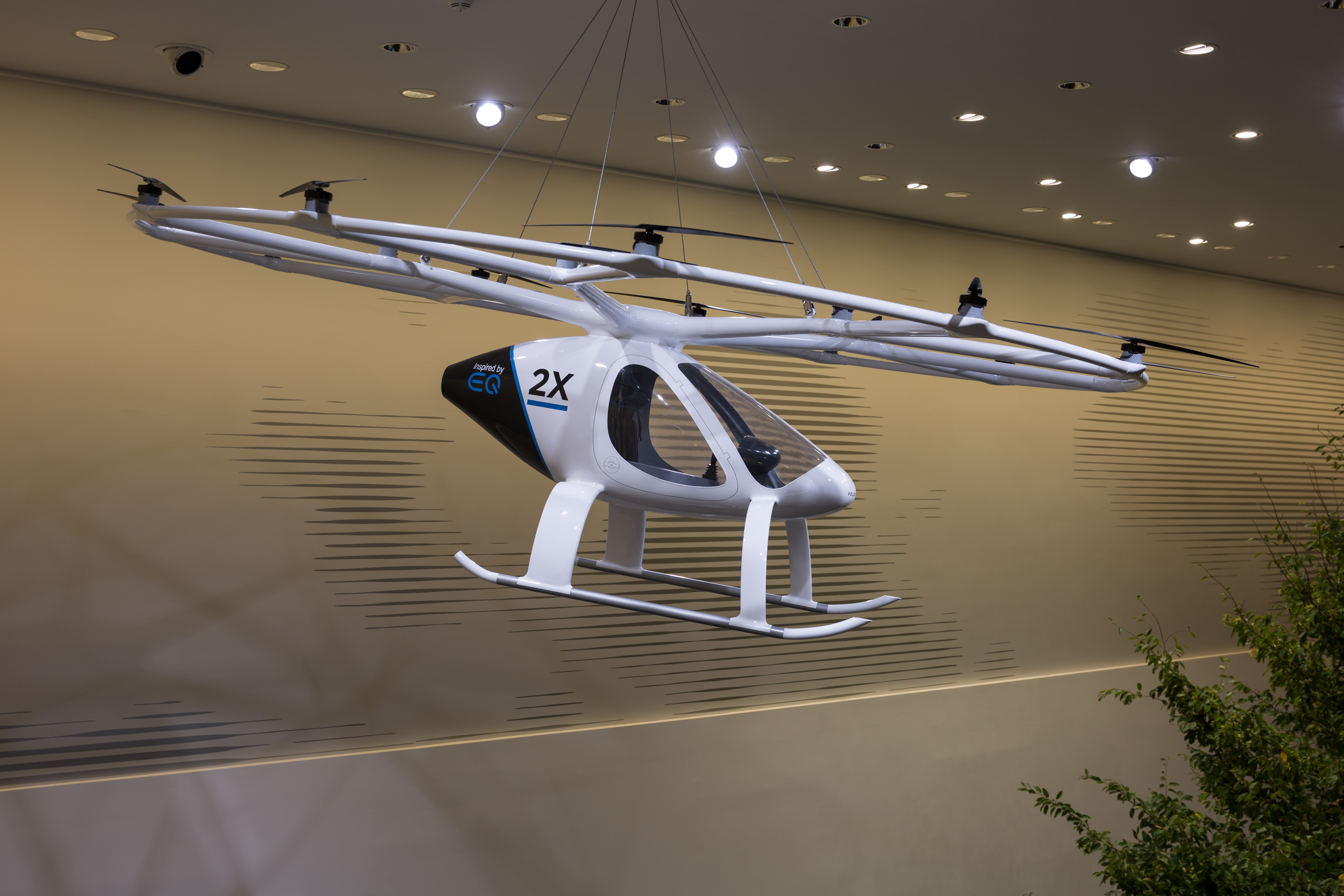
Volocopter 2X display model

The design first flew uncrewed and indoors in an arena in Karlsruhe, Germany, on 17 November 2013. The flight proved the design to have very low vibration levels.

The prototype was shown at AERO Friedrichshafen in April 2015.

The VC200 version was first flown outdoors, uncrewed and tethered, in November 2015. It was remotely controlled by CEO and company co-founder Alexander Zosel.

The first crewed flight was in April 2016, flown by Alexander Zosel. He reported, "the flight was totally awesome. The machine was absolutely reliable, there were no vibrations, it was tremendous. The Volocopter immediately converted every movement I made with the joystick."

Testing of the aircraft and software continued in 2016, establishing flight limits for the software.

The design was employed in Dubai in 2017, conducting uncrewed tests of a proposed air taxi service. Officials in Dubai were drafting the air taxi standards and specifications for operations in Dubai.

A short uncrewed indoor demonstration flight was conducted at the US Consumer Electronics Show in January 2018.

== Specifications (2X) ==
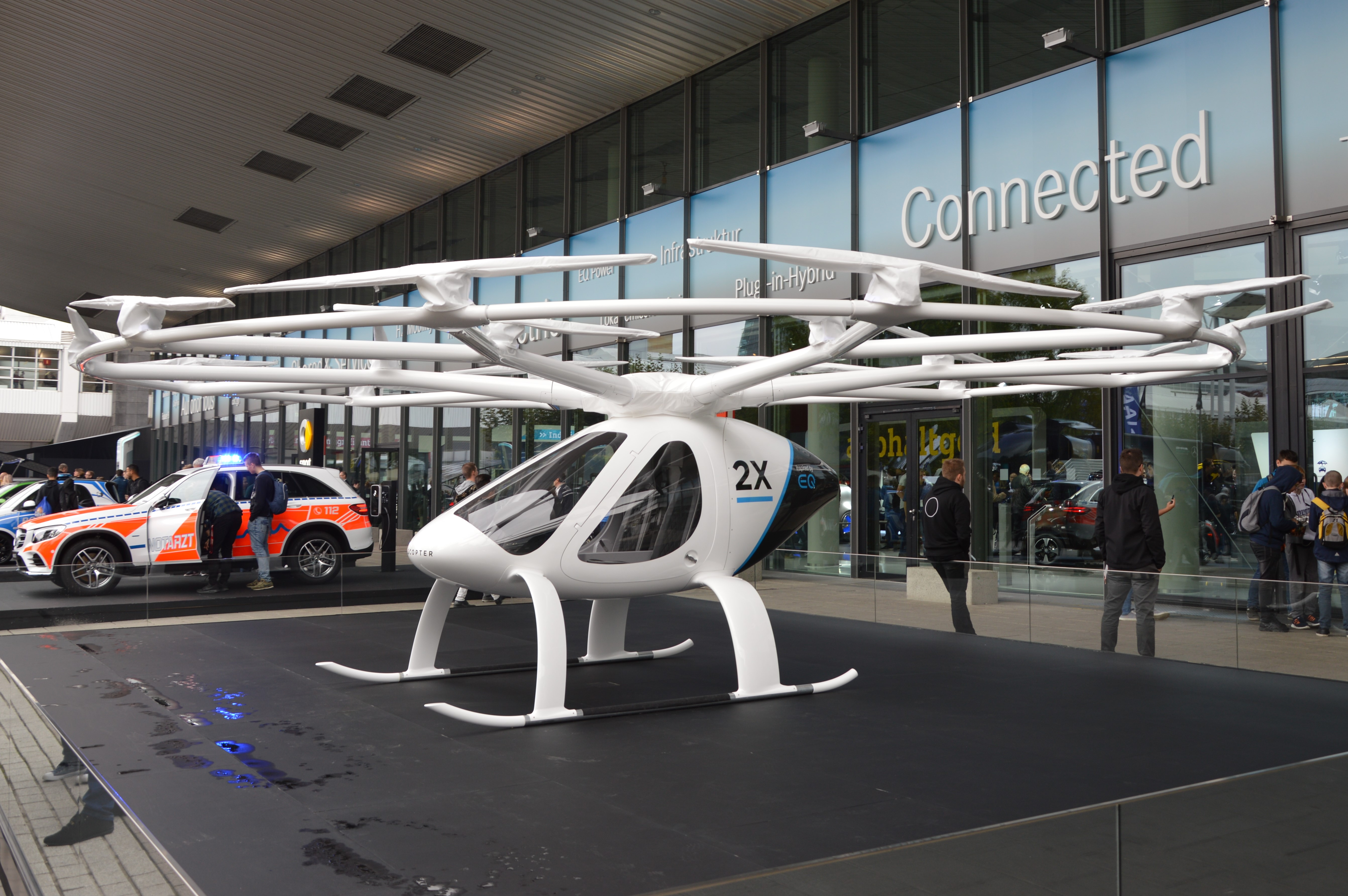
Volocopter 2X

Data from the manufacturer

General characteristics

- Crew: one
- Capacity: one passenger
- Length: 3.20 m (10 ft 6 in) excluding propeller ring
- Width: 9.15 m (30 ft 0 in) including propellers
- Height: 2.15 m (7 ft 1 in)
- Empty weight: 290 kg (639 lb)
- Gross weight: 450 kg (992 lb)
- Powerplant: 18 × three-phase PM synchronous brushless DC electric motors
- Main rotor diameter: 18 × 1.80 m (5 ft 11 in)
- Main rotor area: 45.8 m^{2} (493 sq ft) (total)

Performance

- Maximum speed: 100 km/h (62 mph, 54 kn)
- Range: 27 km (17 mi, 15 nmi) at 70 km/h
- Endurance: 27 minutes
- Service ceiling: 2,000 m (6,600 ft)
- Rate of climb: 3 m/s (590 ft/min)
- Disk loading: 9.8 kg/m^{2} (2.0 lb/sq ft)

== See also ==
- List of rotorcraft
