= Flying platform =

Class of VTOL aircraft

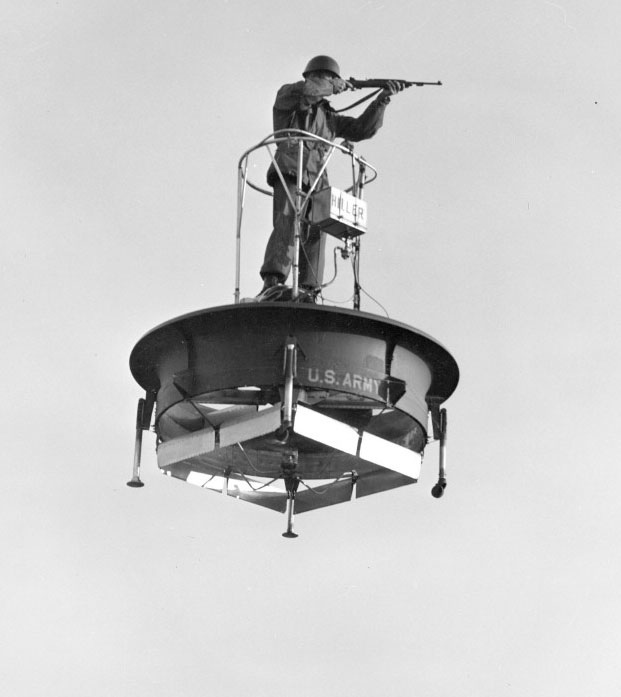
The Hiller VZ-1 Pawnee is an example of a flying platform

A Flying Platform is a type of VTOL aircraft for low cost individual usage for short range within an area. It is usually flown using kinesthetic control, similar to that of a surf board.

== Examples ==
- De Lackner HZ-1 Aerocycle – 1954 experimental personal helicopter model by de Lackner Helicopters
- Hiller VZ-1 Pawnee – 1950s experimental American flying platform
- PKZ-2 – Hungarian and Czech aeronautical engineers
- Williams X-Jet – Single-person lightweight aircraft

== See also ==
- Passenger drone – Autonomous aircraft designed to carry passengers
- Personal air vehicle – Type of aircraft
- Power trowel – Piece of light construction equipment
- Hoverboard – Self-levitating board
