= Multirotor =

Rotorcraft with more than two rotors

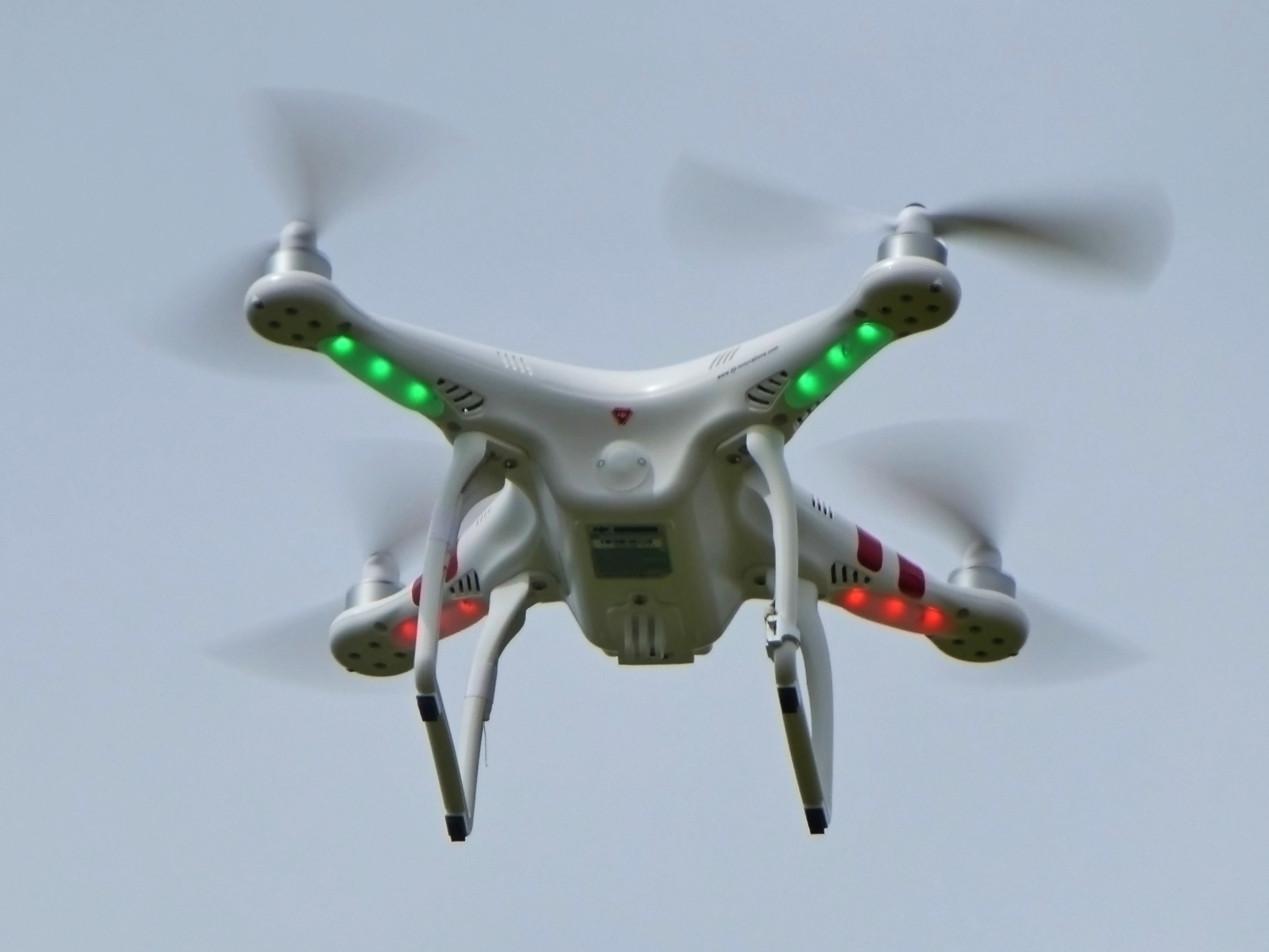
DJI Phantom, a quadcopter

A multirotor or multicopter is a rotorcraft with more than two lift-generating rotors separated horizontally. An advantage of multirotor aircraft is the simpler rotor mechanics required for flight control. Unlike single- and double-rotor helicopters which use complex variable pitch rotors whose pitch varies as the blade rotates for flight stability and control, multirotors often use fixed-pitch blades. They control vehicle motion by varying the relative speed of each rotor to change the thrust and torque produced by each. Some control the pitch of each rotor instead.

Due to their ease of both construction and control, multirotor aircraft are frequently used in radio control aircraft and unmanned aerial vehicle (UAV) projects in which the names tricopter, quadcopter, hexacopter and octocopter are frequently used to refer to 3-, 4-, 6- and 8-rotor rotorcraft, respectively. There is also the X8 (also called octo-quad) configuration that is similar to the quadracopter design, except that it has eight rotors; the lower of which have a reversed rotation direction.

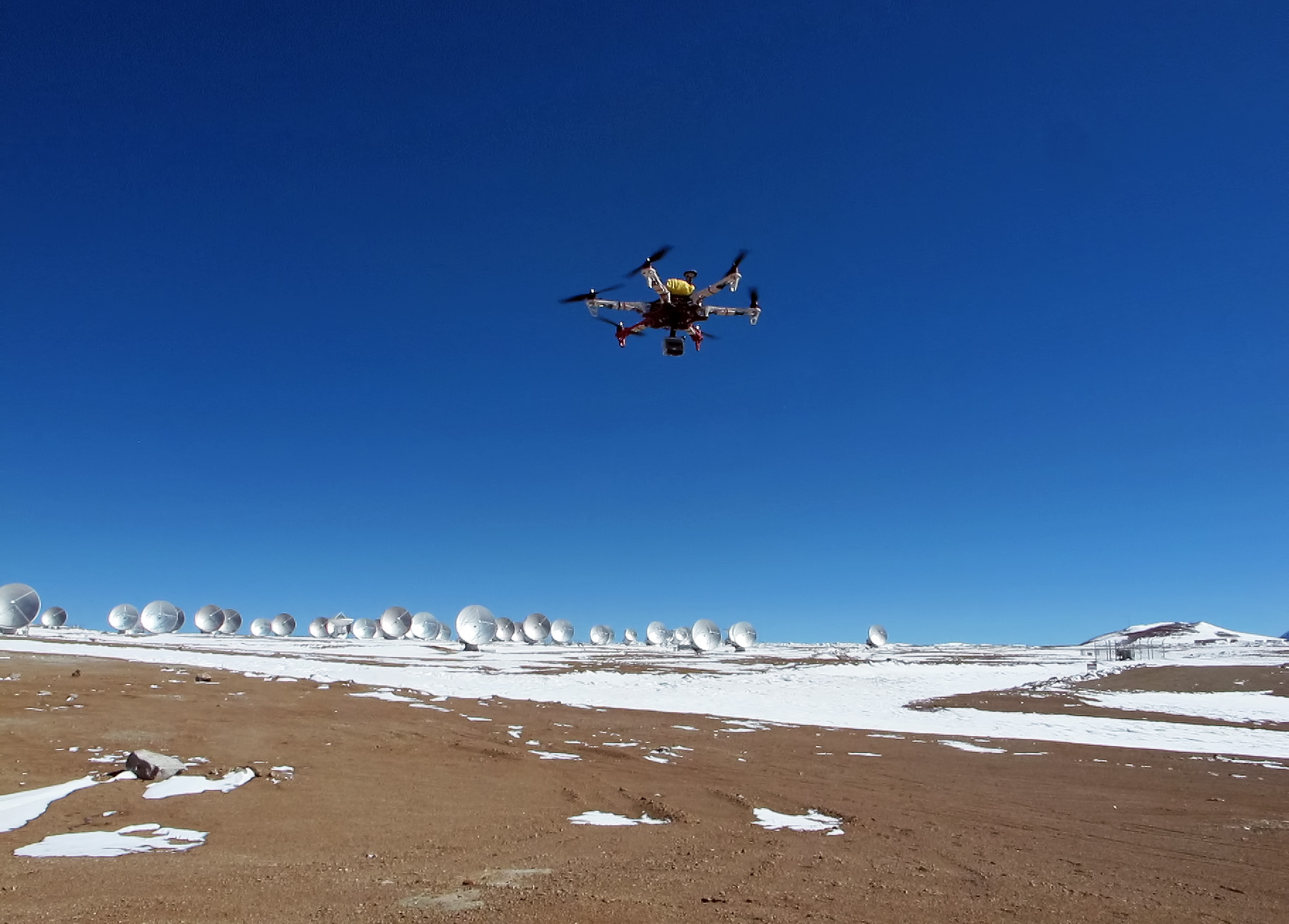
Hexacopter

In order to allow more power and stability at reduced weight, coaxial rotors can be employed, in which each arm has two motors, running in opposite directions which cancels out rotational torque (one facing up and one facing down).

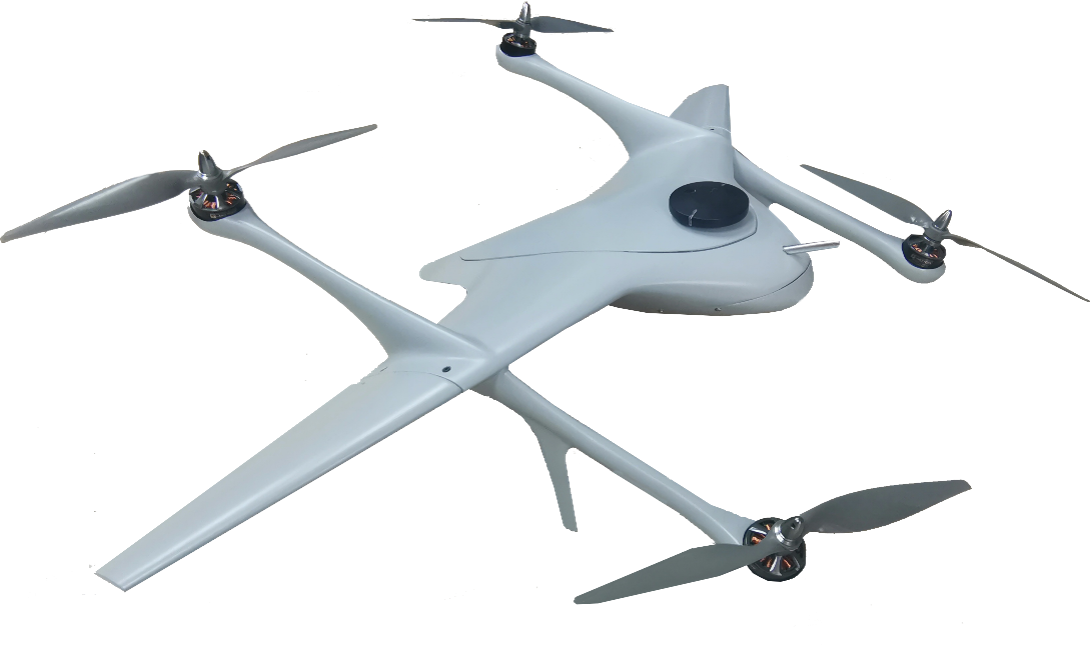
Lifting-wing multicopter

Also possible is the addition of horizontal propellers. These types of rotorcraft (which have just 4 vertical propellers) are called quadplanes. It can also be possible by adding additional nonhorizontal wings, which are called lifting-wing multicopters.

Most multirotors are small, with first-person view and battery power which limits their range, endurance, and payload.

== Military usage ==
On 20 October 2026, a Ukrainian soldier was medically evacuated by an aerial UAV, “the world’s first case of a soldier being evacuated directly from his position using a drone.” The soldier, Kostyantyn Vlasenko, was trapped in his position for 491 days having amputated his own foot and suffering leg injuries. A modified hexacopter, normally used for dropping munitions or cargo, was used because it was considered too dangerous for soldiers due to the presence of Russian drones.

== Manned examples ==
- de Bothezat helicopter - an American four-rotor helicopter that first flew on December 18, 1922, and was used for military evaluation.
- Cierva Air Horse - a British three-rotor "heavy lift" helicopter first flying in 1948. Three rotors were used to give a large lift without compromising rotor strength.
- Bensen B-12 - an American experimental ten-rotor personal helicopter first flown on November 2, 1961. The design was later changed to use eight rotors driven by sixteen motors
- "eVTOL" projects:
  - Airbus A³ Vahana - two American tiltwing octocopter prototypes. Development was ended in 2019 in favor of the CityAirbus project
  - Airbus CityAirbus - a series of experimental multinational ducted X8 helicopters, and now hexacopters
  - Boeing Passenger Air Vehicle - an American octocopter prototype fitted with a pusher propeller and three wings for horizontal flight
  - Jetson One - a Swedish-Italian ultralight X8 helicopter, with four coaxial rotor booms fitted to a motorcycle-like cockpit
  - Pivotal BlackFly - an American octocopter designed to fully rotate in orientation to transition between vertical and horizontal flight, much like more traditional tail-sitters
  - Volocopter designs - a series of German prototype electric multicopters, many such as the 2X & Volocity with 18 rotors, the first electric multicopter in the world to achieve crewed flight. The large number of low-cost motors make it economical, quiet and provide redundancy with ability to maintain control with up to four failed motors.

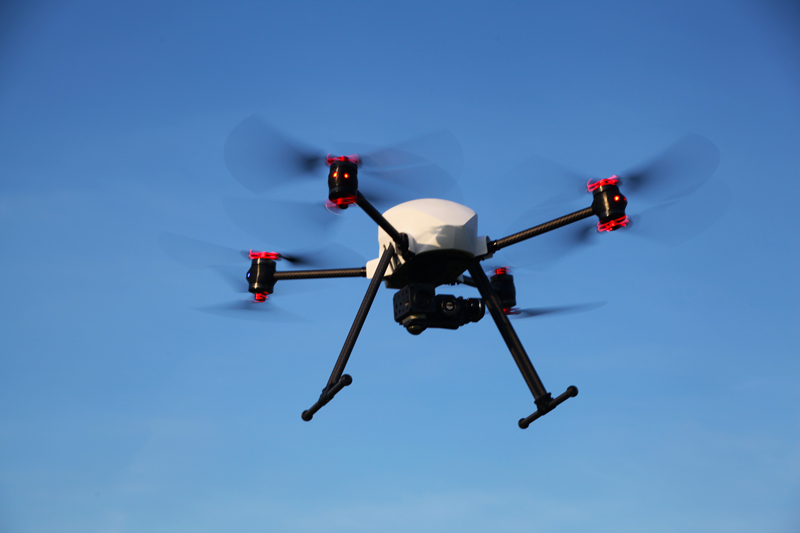
OnyxStar XENA-8F coax foldable drone from AltiGator
