= Personal air vehicle =

Type of aircraft

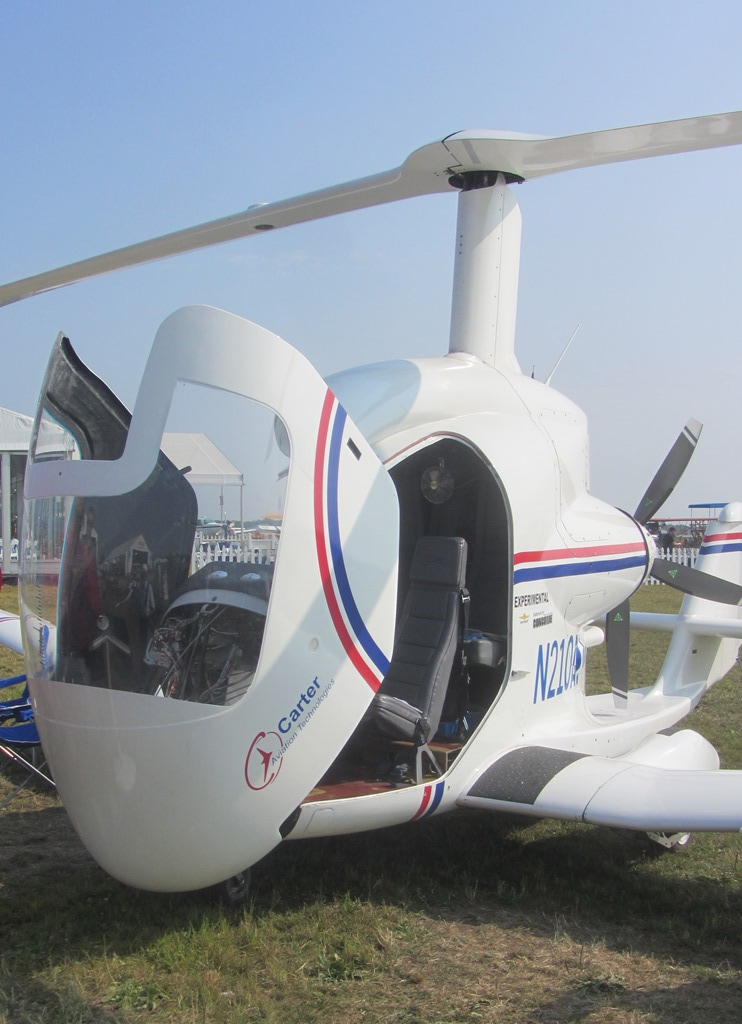
A Carter PAV from 2014

A personal air vehicle (PAV) is a proposed class of passenger aircraft providing on-demand air transport. Many are based on vertical take-off and landing (VTOL).

The emergence of this alternative to traditional ground transport methods has been enabled by unmanned aerial vehicle (UAV) technologies and electric propulsion. Barriers include aviation safety, airworthiness, operating costs, usability, airspace integration, aircraft noise and emissions. Its issues were tackled first by small unmanned aircraft systems (UAS) certification then experience.

== Definition ==
The personal air vehicle ise an autonomous electric aircraft with point-to-point VTOL capability. It may or may not be treated as a single-seat autonomous electric vehicle, as distinguished from the multi-seat eVTOL. It is intended to provide flight convenience similar to the private car in terms of accessibility and ease of operation, while also offering the speed and routing efficiencies made possible by direct point-to-point flight. The PAV differs from conventional general aviation types in being usable by people with no pilot qualifications.

== Characteristics ==
=== Autonomy ===
Besides the fabrication of personal air vehicles, the creation of autonomous systems for PAVs is also being researched. First off, synthetic vision electronic flight instrument systems (EFIS) as Highway in the sky (HITS) makes it much easier to control aircraft. Also, Phantom Works is working on designing a system that allows to automate PAVs. The PAVs are designated their own "lanes" in the sky, thereby ensuring the avoidance of possible collisions. In addition, the different PAVs are also capable of detecting each other and communicating with each other, further decreasing the risk of collisions.

== Issues ==
=== Air traffic control ===
The Federal Aviation Administration (FAA) infrastructure is not currently capable of handling the increase in aircraft traffic that would be generated by PAVs. The FAA plan to upgrade forms the Next Generation Air Transportation System, planned for 2025. An interim plan is to use smaller airports. Modeling by NASA and others have shown that PAVs using smaller community airports would not interfere with commercial traffic at larger airports. Currently there are over 10,000 public and private small airports in the United States that could be used for this type of transportation. This infrastructure is currently underutilized, used primarily by recreational aircraft.

=== Noise ===
Noise from PAVs could also upset communities if they operate near homes and businesses. Without lower noise levels that enable residential landings, any PAV must take off and land at an FAA-controlled airfield, where higher sound levels have been approved.

Studies have explored ways to make helicopters and aircraft less noisy, but noise levels remain high. In 2005 a simple method of reducing noise was identified: Keep aircraft at a higher altitude during landing. This is called a Continuous Descent Approach (CDA).

=== Range ===
Many proposed PAV aircraft are based on electric batteries, however they have low range due to the low specific energy of current batteries. This range may be insufficient to provide adequate safety margin to find a landing site in an emergency.

Fuel cell aircraft have been proposed as a solution to this issue, owing to the much higher specific energy of hydrogen.

=== Safety ===
Urban flight safety is a well-known problem for regulators and industry. On May 16, 1977, the New York Airways accident of a Sikorsky S-61 helicopter shuttle from John F. Kennedy International Airport, which landed on the roof of the Pan Am Building (now MetLife Building) when a landing gear collapsed and a detached rotor blade killed several people on the helipad and one woman on Madison Avenue, ending that business for decades almost around the world. Current helicopter accident rates would be insufficient for urban mobility. The Sikorsky S-92's safety-focused design still allows one fatal accident per million flight hours. This rate would lead to 150 accidents per year for 50,000 eVTOLs flying 3,000 hours a year.

For Sikorsky Innovations, the $30 billion urban air mobility market requires safety standards compliant with FAR Part 29, which governs over 7,000 lb (3.2 t) helicopters. By May 2018, Sikorsky flew an S-76 120 hours with full point-to-point, real time autonomous flight and terrain avoidance with Level A software and redundancy, with a safety pilot. Sikorsky Aircraft plans to reach a vertical flight safety of one failure per 10 million hours on high-utilization platforms by combining current rotorcraft experience with advances in autonomous flight, airspace integration and electric propulsion.

== History ==
NASA established the Personal Air Vehicle Sector Project in 2002, as part of their Vehicle Systems Program (VSP). This project was part of the NASA Vehicle Integration, Strategy, and Technology Assessment (VISTA) office, which also included sectors for Subsonic Transports, VTOL Aircraft, Supersonic Aircraft, and High Altitude Long Endurance Aircraft. The objective of each sector was to establish vehicle capability goals and the required technology investment strategies to achieve those breakthroughs.

The difference in vehicle characteristics between PAVs and existing General Aviation single engine piston aircraft was set out in 2003 at an American Institute of Aeronautics and Astronautics (AIAA) conference. Advanced concepts would be needed to dramatically enhance ease of use, safety, efficiency, field length performance, and affordability.

In 2006 the VSP was replaced by new NASA Aeronautics initiatives. PAV technology development efforts at NASA shifted to a prize-based investment, with NASA Centennial Challenge Prize funds of $250,000 being provided for a Personal Air Vehicle Challenge in 2007.

=== Studies ===
The European Union is funding a 3-leg €4.2m study (under the Seventh Framework Programme) of technologies and impacts for PAVs; Human-aircraft interaction, Automation of aerial systems in cluttered environments, and Exploring the socio-technological environment.

=== PAV challenge ===
NASA Langley has researched and prototyped the necessary PAV technologies and has dedicated the largest cash prize in the history of GA to the PAV that can demonstrate the best overall combination of performance. The PAV flight competition for this prize, known as the first annual PAV Challenge, was held Aug 4-12, 2007 and hosted the CAFE Foundation in Santa Rosa, California.

In 2008 the challenge was renamed as the General Aviation Technology Challenge.

The new prizes were:

- The Community Noise Prize ($150,000)
- The Green Prize ($50,000) (MPG)
- The Aviation Safety Prize ($50,000) (Handling, eCFI)
- The CAFE 400 Prize ($25,000) (Speed)
- The Quietest LSA Prize ($10,000)

The winners were:

- Community Noise Lambada N109UA $20,000
- Green Prize no winner n/a
- CAFE Safety Pipistrel N2471P $50,000
- CAFE 400 Pipistrel N2471P $2,000
- Quietest LSA Lambada N109UA $10,000
- Shortest Takeoff Pipistrel N2471P $3,750
- Best Angle of Climb Pipistrel N2471P $3,750
- Best Glide Ratio at 100 MPH Flightdesign CTSW N135CT $3,750
- Cabin Noise (tie) Lambada N109UA Pipistrel N2471P $3,750 ($1,875 each)

== List of personal air vehicles ==
| Type | Country | Class | Date | No. | Status | Notes |
|---|---|---|---|---|---|---|
| Airbus A³ Vahana | EU | Convertiplane | 2018 | 2 | Prototype | |
| AM-20 eVTOL | US | Lift-plus-cruise | 2019 | 1 | Prototype | Under development |
| Boeing Passenger Air Vehicle | US | Rotorcraft | 2019 | 1 | Prototype | |
| Carter PAV | US | Rotorcraft | 2011 | 2 | Prototype | |
| Volocopter 2X | Germany | Rotorcraft | 2016 | 2 | Prototype | Prototypes were the VC1 and VC200. |
| Wisk Cora | US | Rotorcraft | 2019 | 1 | Prototype | |
| Xplorair PX200 | France | Powered lift | | | Project | Hybrid jet powerplant |

== See also ==
- Flying car – Car that can be flown in much the same way as a car may be driven
- Flying platform – Class of VTOL aircraft
- Passenger drone – Autonomous aircraft designed to carry passengers
- Ultralight aircraft – Aviation field involving lightweight aircraft
