= Horizon Aircraft =

Canadian aerospace company

New Horizon Aircraft Ltd.
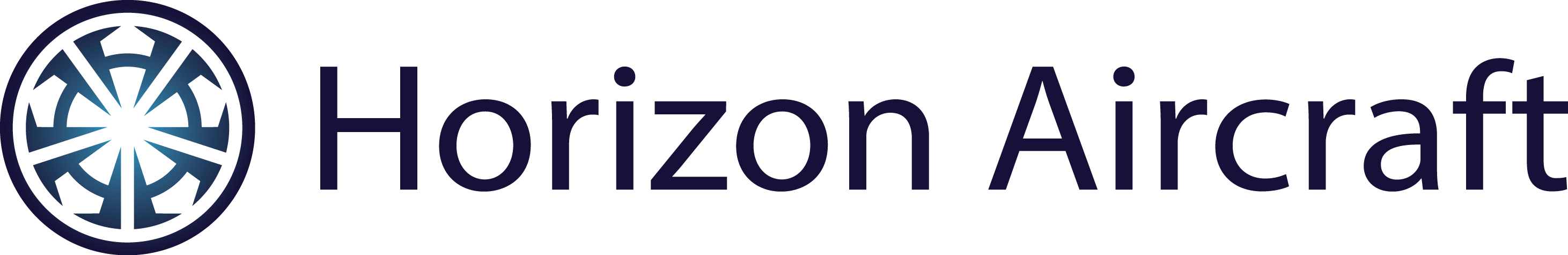
- Trade name: Horizon Aircraft
- Company type: Public
- Traded as: Nasdaq: HOVR
- ISIN: CA64550A1075
- Industry: Aviation, Advanced Air Mobility
- Founded: 2013; 13 years ago
- Founders: Brian Robinson; Brandon Robinson
- Headquarters: Lindsay, Ontario, Canada
- Area served: Worldwide
- Key people: Brandon Robinson (CEO), Brian Robinson (CTO), Jason O'Neill (COO), Brian Merker (CFO)
- Products: Electric Vertical Takeoff and Landing aircraft
- Net income: ▲$5.2 million (2025)
- Total assets: ▲$8.4 million (2025)
- Total equity: ▲$2.6 million (2025)
- Number of employees: 52 (2026)
- Website: horizonaircraft.com

New Horizon Aircraft Ltd. is a publicly traded company headquartered in Lindsay, Ontario, which is developing a hybrid eVTOL aircraft for regional air mobility.

It is designing the Horizon Cavorite X7 as a hybrid-electric 6-passenger aircraft that has electric fans for vertical takeoff and landing and a turboprop engine for forward flight. Horizon Aircraft expects that its hybrid architecture will result in greater range compared to electric-only VTOL aircraft, while having 70–80% lower operating costs and twice the speed of a traditional helicopter. Development of a full-scale prototype is ongoing with the intent of having the Cavorite X7 certified and flying.

== History ==
Horizon Aircraft was founded in 2013 by Brian and Brandon Robinson to develop an amphibious aircraft. After investigating available technologies, the company pivoted to developing an electric VTOL aircraft augmented by conventional propulsion.

In June 2021, Horizon was acquired by Astro Aerospace Ltd. in an all-stock deal. In August 2022, Astro and Horizon agreed to unwind the deal and Horizon was sold back to its original shareholders.

In September 2023, Horizon announced that their planned full-scale aircraft would be scaled up from the 5-seater Horizon Cavorite X5 to a 7-seater called the Horizon Cavorite X7 after positive results from flight tests.

In 2024, Horizon merged with special-purpose acquisition company Pono Capital Three to go public on the Nasdaq stock exchange, and signed a letter of intent to sell 50 Cavorite X7 aircraft to Indian private jet operator JetSetGo.

As of June 2026, Horizon Aircraft had approximately 52 employees.

== Design ==
The Cavorite X7 incorporates Horizon Aircraft's patented "fan-in-wing" configuration, which integrates multiple electric lift fans within the aircraft's wing structure. During vertical flight, sliding wing surfaces open to expose the lift fans, while during forward flight the surfaces close, allowing the aircraft to operate as a conventional fixed-wing airplane.

The Cavorite series uses a split-wing design. The Cavorite X7 uses 5 battery-powered vertical lift fans in each of two wings along with 1 fan in each of two nose canards. At altitude, a gas-powered propeller powers forward flight. The 6-passenger (plus one pilot) is planned to achieve 280 miles per hour (450 km/h) offer a 500 mile range.

The aircraft's configuration differs from several other eVTOL designs, including those developed by Joby Aviation and Archer Aviation, which utilize externally mounted propellers or tilt-prop systems for vertical lift.

FAA heliport design guidance specifies touchdown and lift-off areas (TLOFs), final approach and takeoff areas (FATOs), and safety areas based on aircraft dimensions and rotor clearances. Similar standards used by aviation authorities generally require FATO dimensions and associated safety areas to be determined by the size of the design aircraft and its rotor system.

Horizon Aircraft has stated that the fan-in-wing design was developed to improve compatibility with existing heliport infrastructure, including hospital heliports, rooftop landing facilities, and shipboard landing areas. The company has also stated that the aircraft's hybrid-electric architecture is intended to reduce dependence on dedicated charging infrastructure compared with fully battery-electric aircraft.

Industry observers have identified vertiport construction, electrical infrastructure requirements, and certification pathways as significant factors affecting the deployment of advanced air mobility aircraft and eVTOL networks.

In May 2025, Horizon Aircraft announced the successful transition of a large-scale prototype from vertical flight to wing-borne forward flight, which the company described as validation of its fan-in-wing technology.

== See also ==
- Archer Aviation
- EHang
- Joby Aviation
- Lilium
- Vertical Aerospace
