= Horizon Cavorite X7 =

Proposed hybrid-electric VTOL aircraft

Cavorite X7

General information
- Type: Hybrid-electric VTOL transport
- National origin: Canada
- Manufacturer: Horizon Aircraft
- Status: Full-scale prototype

History
- Introduction date: Late 2020s (expected)

The Horizon Cavorite X7 is a planned Canadian hybrid-electric vertical take-off and landing (eVTOL) aircraft designed by Horizon Aircraft. It is designed to use electric fans for vertical flight and a turboprop engine for horizontal flight, enabling a range of 800 km (500 mi) and a 450 km/h (280 mph) top speed. After successful flight tests with a sub-scale prototype, Horizon is building a full-scale prototype with the intent of having a certified aircraft fly before 2030.

== Design ==
Named after the fictional gravity-defying material in H.G. Wells' novel The First Men in the Moon, the Cavorite X7 is designed to be powered by a Pratt and Whitney Canada PT6 turboprop that also acts as a generator for 12 ducted electric fans embedded in the wing surfaces. After the aircraft lifts off the ground and obtains sufficient forward speed, panels will cover the fans to reduce drag and extend the range of the aircraft. While in forward flight, the turboprop engine will recharge the onboard battery array so that energy is available for the electric fans in the landing phase. The hybrid architecture is expected to increase range and top speed compared to multi-copter, purely electric VTOL aircraft.

The Cavorite X7 has forward-swept wings, rather than the zero-sweep or rear-swept wings that are more common. Forward-swept wings were chosen to provide the aircraft with improved low-speed handling ability, which is useful when transitioning between vertical and horizontal flight. Forward-swept wings have their lift change more gradually as the aircraft's angle of attack approaches its stall angle, improving handling predictability. The forward sweep also enables greater cabin room by pushing the main wing spar towards the rear of the aircraft. The main disadvantage of forward-swept wings is their tendency for their tips to bend upwards and twist during turns, requiring very stiff wings or tailored composite fabrication to avoid spin dives or structural failure from high G-loads.

Initially designed to carry 4 passengers in addition to the pilot as the Cavorite X5, the design was scaled up to carry 6 passengers after positive flight-testing results and feedback from prospective customers, making the Cavorite X7 more suitable for medevac, business aviation, and cargo transport.

== Orders ==
In July 2026, Horizon received a letter of intent from V-Star Powered Lift Aviation in Australia for five Cavorite X7 aircraft with options for additional 95 aircraft.

== Specifications ==
Data from Horizon Aircraft / Electric VTOL News by the Vertical Flight Society

General characteristics

- Crew: 1 pilot
- Capacity: 6 passengers, or 2 passengers and 1 stretcher
- Length: 11.6 m (38 ft 1 in)
- Wingspan: 15 m (49 ft 3 in)
- Height: 2.8 m (9 ft 2 in)
- Gross weight: 2,500 kg (5,512 lb)
- Max takeoff weight: 680 kg (1,499 lb) with vertical takeoff, max weight with horizontal takeoff is 815 kilograms (1,797 lb)
- Powerplant: 1 × Pratt & Whitney Canada PT6A turboprop engine
- Powerplant: 12 × electric lift fans

Performance

- Maximum speed: 450 km/h (280 mph, 240 kn)
- Range: 800 km (500 mi, 430 nmi)
- Ferry range: 1,450 km (900 mi, 780 nmi)

== See also ==
- Archer Midnight
- EHang 216
- Joby Aviation S4
- Lilium Jet
