= SkyDrive =

SkyDrive may refer to:

- OneDrive, a Microsoft file hosting service, which was renamed from SkyDrive in February 2014
- SkyDrive (company), a Japanese flying car company
