= Joby Aviation =

American aviation company

Joby Aviation, Inc.
- Formerly: Joby Aero (2009–2021)
- Type: Public
- Traded as: NYSE: JOBY
- Industry: Aerospace, Advanced Air Mobility
- Founded: September 11, 2009; 17 years ago
- Founder: JoeBen Bevirt
- Headquarters: Santa Cruz, California, U.S.
- Key people: JoeBen Bevirt (CEO); Paul Sciarra (Chairman)
- Products: Electric aircraft
- Revenue: ▲$53.43 million (2025)
- Operating income: ▼$-719.59 million (2025)
- Net income: ▼$-929.84 million (2025)
- Total assets: ▲$1.795 billion (2025)
- Total equity: ▲$1.409 billion (2025)
- Number of employees: 2,559 (2026)
- Website: jobyaviation.com

Joby Aviation, Inc. is an American venture-backed aviation company, developing an electric vertical takeoff and landing (eVTOL) aircraft that it intends to operate as an air taxi service. Joby Aviation is headquartered in Santa Cruz, California and has offices in San Carlos, California; Marina, California; and Munich, Germany.

== History ==
=== Beginnings ===
Joby Aviation was founded as Joby Aero on September 11, 2009 as one of several projects incubated by JoeBen Bevirt on his ranch in the Santa Cruz Mountains, using the proceeds from successful exits of previous companies. According to the company's website, the early years were spent exploring different components of electric aviation, including electric motors, flight software, and lithium-ion batteries. The research led Joby to participate in the NASA X-57 Maxwell and LEAPTech projects, before developing its own air taxi concept. Joby's early concept, publicly called the S2, had eight tilting propellers arrayed along the leading edge of its wing and four more tilting propellers mounted on its V-shaped tail. Later, the company moved to a configuration that features six rotating propellers.

By 2015, the company was operating subscale prototypes of its eVTOL aircraft, moving to full-scale unmanned prototypes in 2017, and a production prototype in 2019. In 2018, the company announced a Series B funding round of $100 million, led by Toyota AI Ventures. By 2019, the company was in active conversations with the FAA about certifying the aircraft and announced a partnership with Uber's Elevate division.

For its first ten years, Joby operated in stealth mode, sometimes leading to skepticism of the company's claims. The first journalist granted access to the aircraft in 2018 agreed not to disclose details about the aircraft. In 2020, however, the company began releasing significantly more information, starting with its January announcement of a $590 million funding round, led by Toyota Motor Corporation. At that announcement, the company revealed its production vehicle. In January 2020, Bevirt was a keynote speaker at the meeting of the Vertical Flight Society.

=== Development ===
In January 2020, Joby announced plans to manufacture the aircraft in Marina, California at the Marina Municipal Airport. The plans include building a 55,000 square foot production facility, followed by a 500,000 square foot factory. Late in 2020, Joby Aviation acquired Uber Elevate, and the U.S. Air Force announced that it had granted Joby its first eVTOL airworthiness certification as part of its Agility Prime program.

In February 2021, the company announced a partnership with Garmin to provide flight deck equipment and announced that it had obtained a 'G-1' certification basis for its aircraft with the FAA. In May, 2021, a NOVA episode on PBS featured Joby. The city of Marina and the FAA approved the company's plan for a production facility in June 2021. In August 2021, the company announced a 155-mile flight on a single charge in 77 minutes, comparative noise tests against other aircraft and its application for air Part 135 and Part 23 carrier certifications. The battery used an 811 NMC (nickel-manganese-cobalt oxide) cathode and a graphite anode. On August 11, the company went public using a special-purpose acquisition company.

In January 2022, the company registered what it claimed was the fastest eVTOL flight to date, traveling at a true airspeed of 205 mph (330 km/h).

On February 16, 2022, a remotely piloted prototype crashed during a test flight in rural California, sustaining substantial damage. The National Transportation Safety Board determined that the crash and subsequent fire were caused by an in-flight component failure. In April 2022, Joby acquired hydrogen-aviation pioneer H2Fly, a spinoff of the DLR Institute of Engineering Thermodynamics of the German Aerospace Center. In May 2022, Joby received Part 135 air service certification from the FAA, operating a fleet of Cirrus SR22s while it continues seeking certification for its eVTOL aircraft.

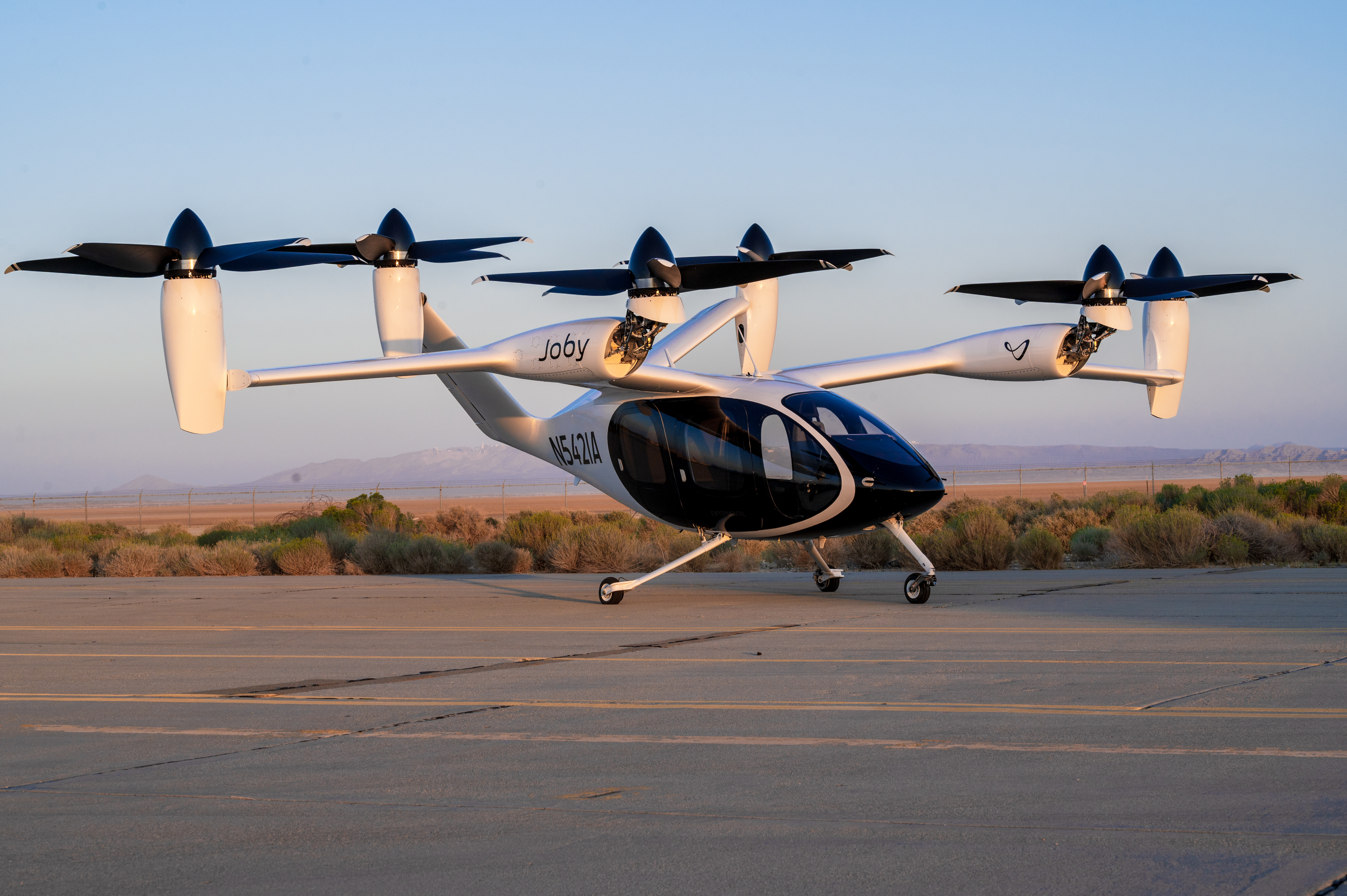
Joby S4 parked on a taxiway following ground testing at Edwards AFB

On June 28, 2023, the company rolled out the first production version of the aircraft and announced it had received FAA approval to flight test that version, sending its stock price as high as 42% above its previous close in midday trading. The company said the U.S. Air Force will receive early production units in 2024 as part of a $131 million contract, which would be the first ever eVTOL to be delivered to a paying customer.

In September 2023, Joby Aviation delivered its first eVTOL air taxi to Edwards Air Force Base in California. Joby flew its aircraft in Manhattan, New York on November 12, 2023, marking the first eVTOL flight in New York City and the first time Joby has flown in an urban setting. A demonstration flight was performed at the Downtown Manhattan Heliport in conjunction with an announcement by the city of its intention to electrify the facility. The autonomy division of Xwing was acquired by Joby Aviation in June 2024.

On June 24, 2024, Joby Aviation's S4 eVTOL demonstrator, converted to hydrogen-electric power in May, completed a record 523 miles non-stop flight, more than triple the range of the battery powered version. It landed with 10% fuel remaining in its cryogenic fuel tank that had a capacity of 88 lb of liquid hydrogen at 22 Kelvin. The H2Fly-developed ‘H2F-175’ hydrogen fuel cell system provided the power for the six electric rotors of the eVTOL during its flight; a small battery, charged by the fuel cell, provided added takeoff and landing power. The only in-flight emission was water vapor. The same aircraft later flew 561 miles non-stop including a vertical takeoff and landing.

In August 2025, Joby agreed to acquire Blade Air Mobility's passenger rideshare business for $125 million.

On November 7, 2025, Joby Aviation’s hybrid S4-T demonstrator, developed in collaboration with L3Harris Technologies, completed its first flight at the company’s Marina, California test facility. The demonstrator integrates a gas-turbine generator with Joby’s electric vertical take-off and landing platform and has been described as a hybrid aircraft with potential military applications, representing an expansion beyond the company’s all-electric S4 air taxi program.

In January 2026, it was announced that Joby had signed an agreement to acquire a second manufacturing facility in Dayton. The facility, spanning more than 700,000 square feet, is intended to support an increase in aircraft production capacity and to complement the company’s existing manufacturing operations in California and Ohio.

In March 2026, Joby Aviation announced the commencement of flight testing for its first FAA-conforming S4 eVTOL aircraft at its Marina, California facility, an important step toward Type Inspection Authorization (TIA) and eventual commercial certification. The aircraft, identified as N547JX, is the first in a fleet built to FAA-approved designs and will be used to support TIA testing by both Joby and FAA pilots.

=== eIPP (2026 - 2029) ===
The Federal Aviation Administration’s Electric Vertical Takeoff and Landing (eVTOL) Integration Pilot Program (eIPP) is a three‑year initiative established to accelerate the safe integration of advanced air mobility (AAM) aircraft into the U.S. National Airspace System and to gather operational data to inform future regulations. Proposals were solicited from state, local, tribal, and territorial governments in partnership with industry participants, with selected pilot projects involving use cases such as air taxi services, regional passenger flights, cargo and logistics operations, emergency medical response, and autonomous flight demonstrations.

In March 2026, Joby Aviation was selected to participate in five of the pilot projects under the eIPP, with opportunities to conduct early operations and demonstrations in regions including the New York/New Jersey area, Texas, Florida, North Carolina, and Utah.

On April 27, 2026, Joby Aviation operated the first point-to-point flight by an eVTOL aircraft in New York City. The demonstration flight took off from John F. Kennedy International Airport and landed at the West 30th Street Heliport. The flight lasted for about 15 minutes and was hosted by the Port Authority of New York and New Jersey, which is leading one of the projects the eIPP.

In September 2026, Joby Aviation began flight operations in Texas under eIPP, in partnership with the Texas Department of Transportation (TxDOT) through its Project Nexus initiative. The company conducted a week-long flight campaign across the Dallas–Fort Worth region, operating its electric aircraft from Perot Field Fort Worth Alliance Airport to destinations including Dallas/Fort Worth International Airport and urban locations across the region. The flights included operations in DFW's controlled airspace and a landing at the Toyota Motor North America headquarters in Plano, Texas. The campaign marked the launch of eIPP operations in Texas and was intended to demonstrate electric aircraft operations in real-world airspace environments and generate operational data to support their future integration into the national airspace system.

== Financing ==
The company was originally self-financed by Bevirt, after the sale of his previous companies, Velocity11 and GorillaPod. On February 1, 2018, Joby Aviation announced that it raised $100 million in a Series B round of funding, including from Intel Capital, Toyota AI Ventures, Jet Blue Technology Ventures, Tesla/SpaceX-backer Capricorn Investment Group, Allen & Company AME Cloud Ventures, Ron Conway, 8VC, CloudKitchens co-founder Sky Dayton, and Pinterest co-founder Paul Sciarra. On January 15, 2020, Joby Aviation announced a Series C round of funding, totaling $590 million, led by Toyota Motor Corporation and a manufacturing partnership with Toyota. In December 2020, Joby Aviation acquired Elevate, Uber's air taxi division, and also received a $75 million investment from Uber, bringing Joby Aviation's total funds raised to $820 million.

In January 2021, it was reported that Joby Aviation was exploring a special-purpose acquisition company (also known as "blank check corporation") to become a public company. In February 2021, the company entered into a business combination agreement with Reinvent Technology Partners, a SPAC funded by LinkedIn co-founder Reid Hoffman and Zynga founder Mark Pincus. Shares in the SPAC, incorporated October 2020 in the Cayman Islands in 2020, were traded on the New York Stock Exchange as the symbol RTP. Upon the closing of the transaction, the combined company will be named Joby Aviation, and become publicly traded, with its common stock to be listed on the New York Stock Exchange as the symbol JOBY.

In October 2022, Delta Air Lines announced a $60 million investment in Joby Aviation to offer “home-to-airport” flights, at first from New York City and Los Angeles.

== Air taxi service ==
Schematic illustrations of a top view of the aircraft in a hover configuration, from a Joby patent corresponding to the production prototype configuration

The Joby air taxi is intended to be a four-passenger commercial aircraft with a pilot, capable of traveling up to 150 miles (240 km) on a single charge at a top speed of 200 mph (320 km/h), with a maximum payload of 1,000 pounds. It is designed to take off and land vertically like a helicopter, and transition to horizontal cruise like a fixed-wing aircraft. Nearly silent in flight, the electric-powered aircraft is designed to operate with no emissions and to be 100 times quieter during takeoff and landing than a helicopter. Joby plans to mass-produce its eVTOL, with a plan to operate a piloted on-demand air-taxi service. The aircraft will be operated as a service with per-trip passenger pricing.

Joby described the Uber Elevate acquisition as a way to accelerate its commercial launch through Elevate's tools and personnel. Elevate had previously operated a service called Uber Copter, which allowed all Uber users in the New York area to book a trip to John F. Kennedy International Airport, with a car taking riders to a heliport and a helicopter then taking riders to the airport. While the service used Bell 430 helicopters with Uber branding, the aircraft were operated by a separate helicopter company, Heliflite. Joby Aviation cited Elevate's software tools enabling market selection, demand simulation and multi-modal operations as the reasons to purchase Elevate, suggesting the acquisition may play a significant role in Joby's commercial service. Joby has not commented on whether it will continue Elevate's plans to launch in Los Angeles, Dallas, and Melbourne.

In Dec 2024 Joby became the first company to fly in Korea’s K-UAM Grand Challenge.

== See also ==
- Archer Aviation
- Beta Technologies
- EHang
- Horizon Aircraft
- SkyDrive
- Vertical Aerospace
- Volocopter (restructured after insolvency)
- Lilium (defunct)
- Zunum Aero (defunct)
