= Advanced air mobility =

Next generation aviation

Advanced air mobility (AAM) systems incorporate support for next-generation aircraft transport such as remotely piloted, autonomous, or vertical take-off and landing (VTOL) aircraft. This includes those powered by electric and/or hybrid-electric propulsion (eVTOL).

The AAM's mission is to promote the development and integration of unmanned aerial systems (UAS) and sustainable aircraft. This requires the development of physical infrastructure for vertiports, as well as highly automated digital infrastructure, i.e. UAS traffic management (UTM).

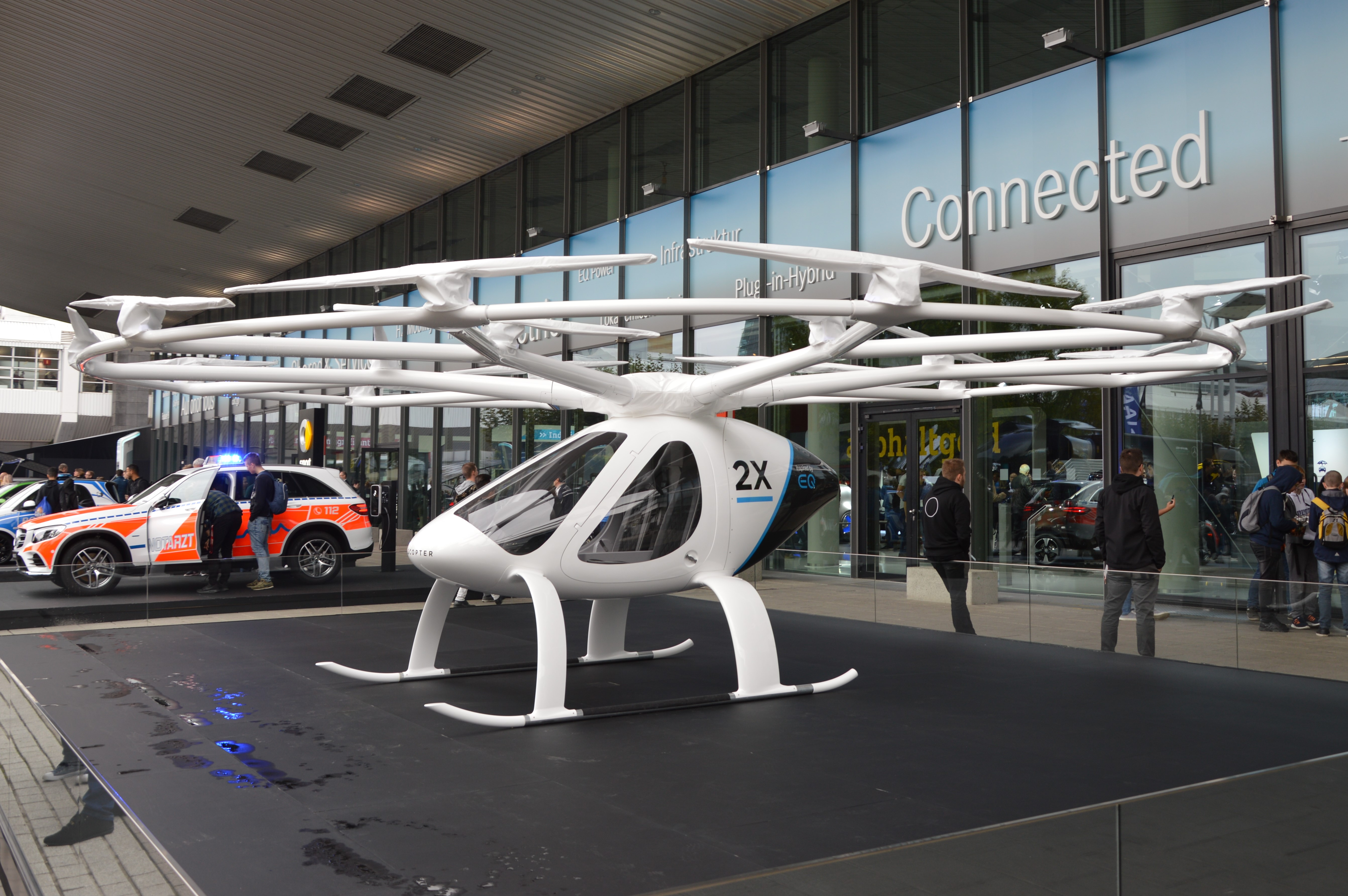
Volocopter eVTOL aircraft

AAM combines both urban air mobility (UAM), which involves transporting persons and cargo above the traffic within a city and regional air mobility (RAM), which is focused more on connecting suburbs, villages and rural towns as well as islands or adjacent communities separated by mountainous regions. UAM has attracted the majority of investment. AAM expands upon the principles of UAM to applications beyond the urban environment:

- Intra-city air transport
- Inter-city air transport
- Cargo delivery
- Public service
- Private vehicles

In February 2020, the National Academies of Sciences, Engineering, and Medicine expanded the scope of the developing UAM concept beyond Manhattan use cases. Since March 2020, UAM has been considered an element of AAM, as defined by the National Aeronautics and Space Administration (NASA). Four months later, the Federal Aviation Administration (FAA) formally adopted the term.

According to a May 2021 market valuation by Morgan Stanley, AAM is projected to be worth 1 trillion (1,000,000,000,000) USD by 2040 and up to $9 trillion a decade later. However, consulting firm Drone Industry Insights, which primarily focuses on the commercial drone market, offers a more conservative forecast of $20.8 billion by 2035, with a CAGR of 22.1%.

== History ==
A video depiction of a passenger-carrying eVTOL concept aircraft dubbed Puffin was shared online on November 11, 2009 by NASA scientist Mark Moore. Inspired by Moore’s papers Larry Page funded two eVTOL startups.

In fall 2016, Uber launched project Elevate following a white paper co-authored by Jeff Holden, Nikhil Goel, and Mark Moore, to explore on-demand air transportation. Three years later, Uber Copter services began in New York City using traditional helicopters. Elevate envisioned a multimodal ride service. Annual Elevate summits hosted from 2017-2019 helped develop the eVTOL and UAM markets pursued by dozens of OEMS.

In 2022 Volkswagen's Chinese subsidiary announced plans to build AAM aircraft in Beijing.

== Comparisons ==
NASA acoustic testing concluded that eVTOLs are "vastly quieter than helicopters". McKinsey aerospace expert Kersten Heineke noted that electric aircraft are "completely emission-free". During the COVID-19 pandemic, the number and value of related investments grew markedly.

== Activities by country ==
=== Australia ===
In 2022, the Australian Civil Aviation Safety Authority (CASA) set out its eVTOL roadmap. Infrastructure group, Skyportz, has been selected to build Australia's first vertiport in Melbourne by 2026.

=== Brazil ===
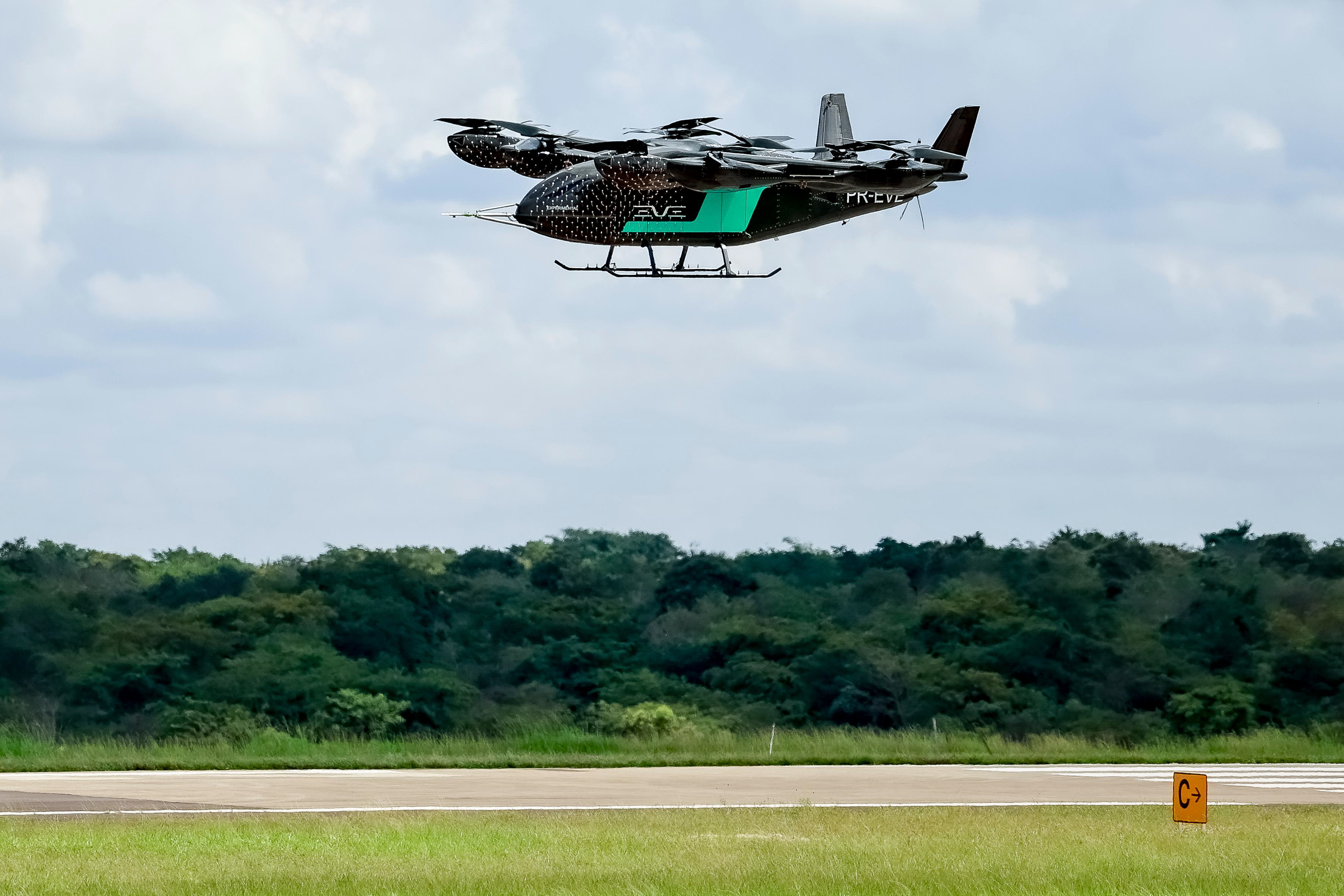
Embraer EVE eVTOL prototype in flight, March 2026

FlyBIS Aviation, a Brazilian start-up teamed with Eve Air Mobility, a division of Embraer. In 2021, Eve signed a Memorandum of Understanding with EDP Group to share research for optimal charging techniques. Eve Air Mobility ranks 7th on the 2022 AAM Reality Index.

=== Canada ===
Horizon Aircraft, based in Lindsay, Ontario has a large scale prototype in flight test. Canadian simulation technology company CAE Inc. and Volocopter forged a strategic partnership to produce the world's first AAM pilot training curriculum.

Construction was to begin in Dubai in 2023 by Canadian vertiport infrastructure group,VPorts, for an Advanced Air Mobility Integrator Center. The center will facilitate eVTOL testing.

=== China ===
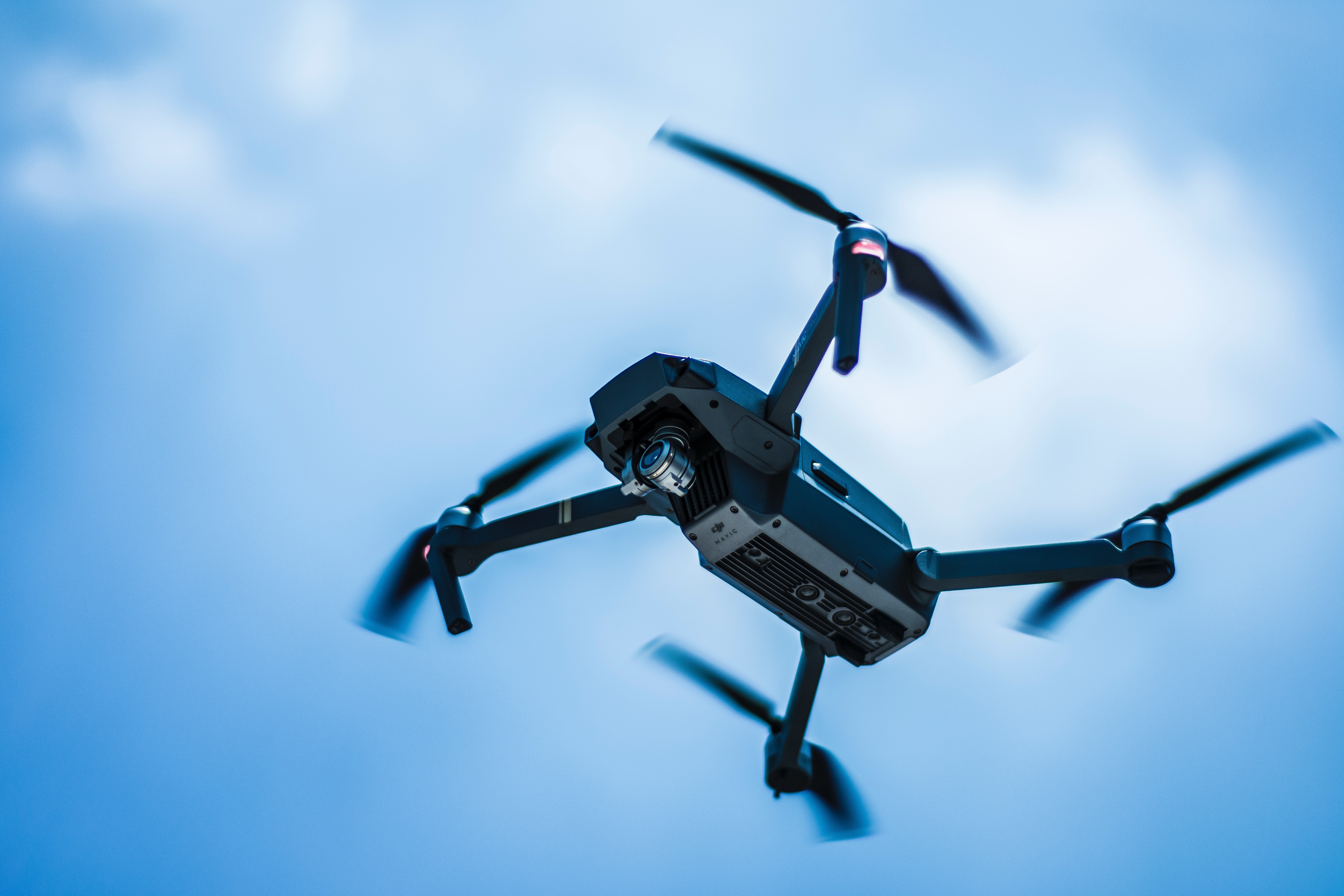
Chinese DJI Mavic Pro small UAS aka drone

In 2019, Chinese manufacturer EHang began extensive passenger flight testing with autonomous eVTOLs. The Spanish National Academy of Police in Avila celebrated a successful public maiden flight of the 'EH216-S' by Chinese manufacturer EHang in December 2022, making Spain the first nation in the European Union to operate an eVTOL for public safety.

=== France ===
Groupe ADP is constructing 4 vertiport locations in Paris. French multinational corporation Thales Group has agreed to integrate its custom avionics solution into the Eve Air Mobility flight deck. French start-up Ascendance Flight Technologies ranked 15th on the 2022 AAM Reality Index. Airbus Helicopters is developing a flying taxi, CityAirbus NextGen, targeted to begin service between 2026 and 2030. The 2024 Olympic Games presented an opportunity to showcase Volocopter eVTOL air taxi flights.

=== Germany ===
EVTOL manufacturers Volocopter and Lilium Jet, ranked 3rd and 4th in the world on the 2022 AAM Reality Index, respectively. As of 2020 Lilium planned to build the first American vertiport outside the City of Orlando, Florida.

=== Japan ===
In Fall 2021, Honda announced plans to enter the hybrid eVTOL market. Toyota switched its support from a Japanese start-up to Joby Aviation.

The following year, SkyDrive secured a strategic partnership with Volatus Infrastructure to develop AAM vertiports. Japan and the MassDOT Aeronautics Division are the only non-European governmental bodies to commit to AAM principles as UIC2 International City/Region Partners along with communities across 15 European nations. In Summer 2022, Tokyo hosted the inaugural International Advanced Air Mobility Expo. As part of World Expo 2025 in Osaka Japan plans to orchestrate nearly 30,000 eVTOL air taxi flights.

=== South Korea ===
Supernal, a division of Hyundai Motor Group ranks 9th on the 2022 AAM Reality Index. American multinational corporation Honeywell agreed to integrate its Anthem avionics into the Supernal flight deck.

=== Spain ===
UAV manufacturer Umiles Next tested its prototype 'Integrity3' and demonstrated collision-avoidance systems as part of its U-space initiative. According to the European Aviation Safety Agency (EASA), U-space includes "all the services required to ensure [UAVs] operate effectively, safely, and securely." Spanish multinational corporation Ferrovial ranks 2nd in the world for AAM vertiport infrastructure readiness alongside Urban-Air Port in the UK and BETA in the US.

MintAir along with American-Canadian firm Jaunt Air Mobility, signed a letter of intent to collaborate on air taxi development.

=== Sweden ===
Swedish start-up Heart Aerospace is developing a hybrid RAM aircraft, earning a 5.1 score in the AAM Reality Index. United Airlines is both a customer and investor.

=== Switzerland ===
Aerial footage over Switzerland

Dufour Aerospace earned a 2022 AAM Reality Index score of 5.2 for its "Aero3" aircraft.

=== Türkiye ===
A landmark collaboration announced at Mobile World Congress 2026 brought together EHang, Türk Telekom, and Argela alliance to integrate pilotless eVTOL technology with advanced telecommunications infrastructure. It combined EHang's autonomous aircraft with Türk Telekom's 5G and cloud capabilities and Argela's AI-supported Unmanned Traffic Management (UTM) platform to establish Turkey's low-altitude economy framework. Planned commercial applications include urban passenger transport, scenic Bosphorus crossings in Istanbul, aerial tourism, cargo logistics, and emergency medical deliveries, with corporate stakeholders like Gözen Holding investing in the sector through pre-orders of eVTOL fleets such as Vertical Aerospace's VX4.

The Directorate General of Civil Aviation (DGCA/SHGM) serves as the primary regulatory authority, actively developing frameworks for unmanned and pilotless aircraft operations, while Argela's domestically developed UTM systems align with international EASA and ICAO standards to provide capabilities for commercial drone registration, real-time flight routing, and vertiport traffic coordination. This regulatory and technological foundation aims to position Turkey competitively within the global AAM landscape.

=== United Kingdom ===
Vertical Aerospace earned an AAM Reality Index score of 7.2, ranking 8th. Virgin Atlantic along with Cranfield University and other industry and academic partners created the Advanced Mobility Ecosystem Consortium and earned a £9.5m grant by the UK's Future Flight Challenge. According to the World Economic Forum, Air-One became the world's first operational vertiport when it opened in April 2022 in Coventry.

=== United States ===
In 2020, Joby Aviation acquired the rights to Uber's Elevate and in August 2021, the company went public. In 2022, Joby set a new eVTOL speed record, had a prototype crash in rural California, achieved an FAA Part 135 air service certification, and signed Delta Air Lines as investor and strategic partner. As of 2024, Joby tied with Beta Technologies and Volocopter with an industry leading AAM Reality Index score of 8.0, followed by Archer Aviation (7.9), Wisk Aero (7.4), Pipistrel (7.2) among the top ten eVTOL manufacturers. The Federal Aviation Administration was to outline its path to fully operational AAM air taxis before summer 2023. United Airlines invested in both Joby and Volocopter.

The City of Los Angeles published Integrating Advanced Air Mobility: A Primer for Cities.

In November 2023, Volocopter and Joby Aviation tested their respective eVTOLs in New York City, from the Downtown Manhattan Heliport.

== Stakeholders ==
This section lists relevant companies by targeted market segment within the advanced air mobility industry.

=== Public initiatives ===
- Advanced Air Mobility Institute

=== Intra-city airborne transportation ===
- Airbus
- Archer Aviation
- BETA Technologies
- EHang
- Eve Air Mobility
- Jaunt Air Mobility
- Joby Aviation
- Lillium GmbH
- Supernal
- Vertical Aerospace
- Volocopter
- Wisk Aero

=== Inter-city airborne transportation ===
- Eviation
- Heart Aerospace
- Horizon Aircraft

While urban and suburban air mobility utilize eVTOL aircraft within a greater metropolitan area, rural and regional air mobility may utilize electric short take-off and landing eSTOL aircraft.

=== Cargo delivery ===
- UPS Flight Forward
- Amazon

=== Public services ===
- Firefighting
- Search & rescue
- Air ambulance
- Power line inspection
- Vaccine delivery
- Beyond visual line of sight (BVLOS) safety testing

=== Personal vehicles ===
- AIR VEV
- Pivotal
- Jetson

== See also ==
- Urban air mobility
- Lists of aviation topics
- List of aviation, avionics, aerospace and aeronautical abbreviations
- Index of aviation articles
