= Beta Technologies Alia =

American electric utility aircraft

Alia
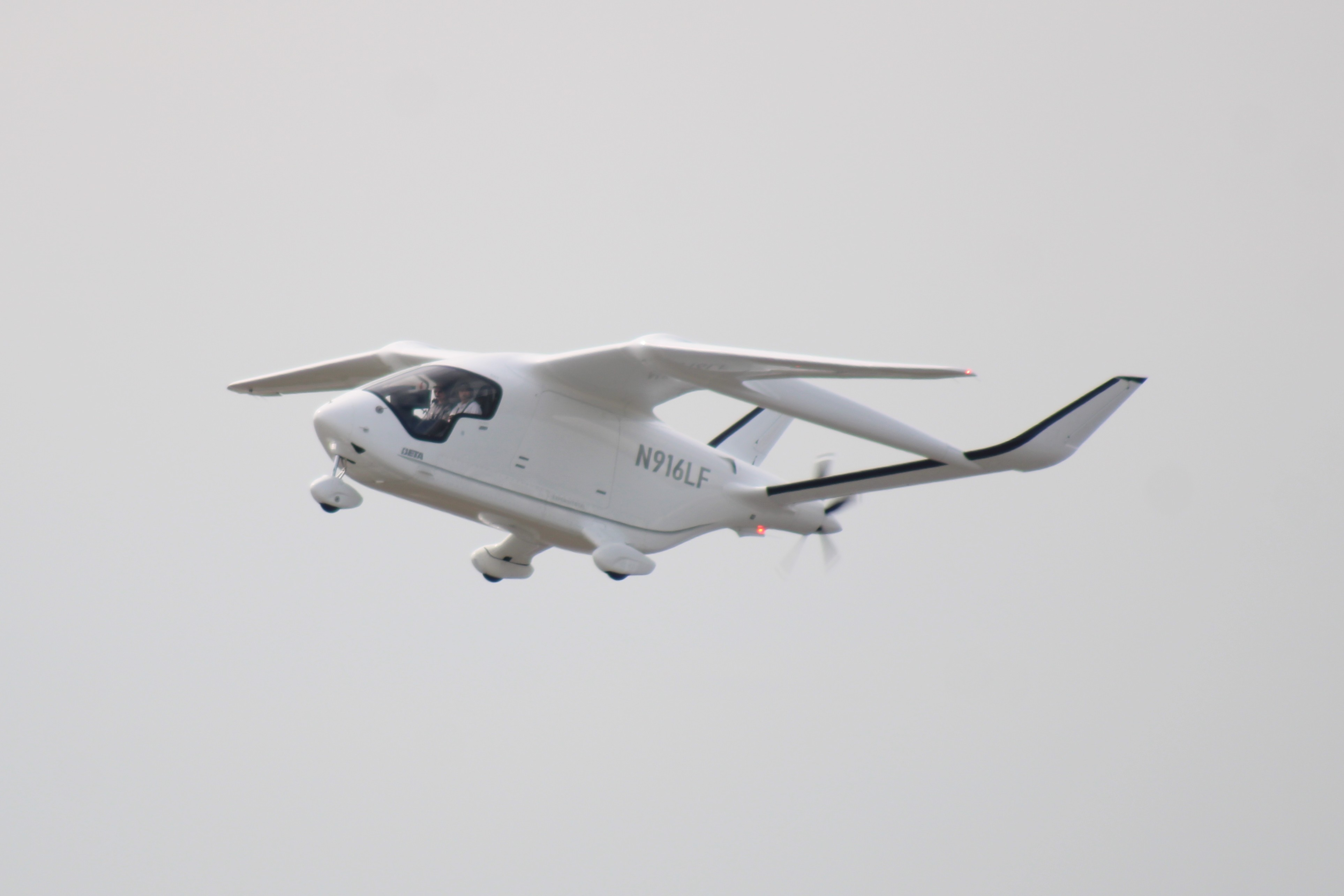
- Alia CX300 in flight

General information
- Type: Utility aircraft
- National origin: United States
- Manufacturer: Beta Technologies
- Status: Active
- Primary user: Beta Technologies

History
- Manufactured: 2020–present
- First flight: Early 2020 (tethered)

The Beta Technologies Alia (officially stylized as ALIA) is an electric utility aircraft built by Beta Technologies. The Alia is built in two models; the VTOL A250, and the CTOL CX300. An unmanned military variant is also in development as the MV250.

== Design and development ==
Beta Technologies unveiled the Alia A250 eVTOL prototype in June 2020. A successor to the company's Ava prototype, the Alia is a small 6,000 lb (2,720 kg) aircraft with an arched 50 ft (15 m) wing. An electric aircraft, the Alia A250 is powered by a single pusher propeller for forward flight as well as four rotors mounted at wing level for VTOL flight. Beta announced a five-passenger variant of the Alia in September 2024, though a prototype had yet to be built.

A CTOL variant, the Alia CX300, was announced in March 2023. Apart from its lack of VTOL capabilities, the CX300 is largely identical to the A250. The first production Alia, a CX300, was fitted with a Garmin’s G3000 Prime avionics system, making Beta Technologies the first manufacturer to incorporate the system in an electric aircraft.

== Operational history ==
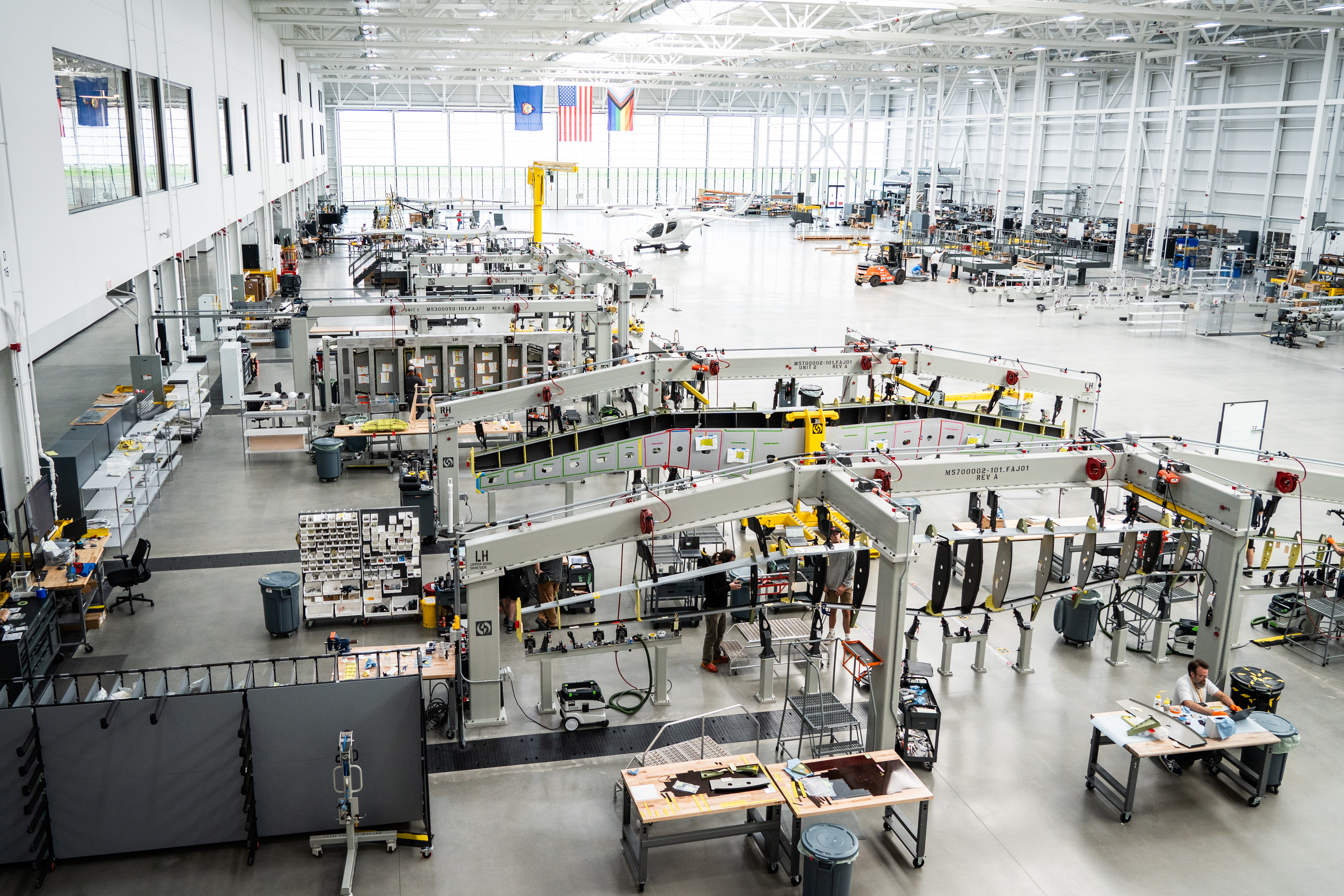
Beta Technologies' final assembly and production facility in South Burlington, Vermont. Multiple Alia aircraft are in various stages of production, and in the center is the second A250 prototype.

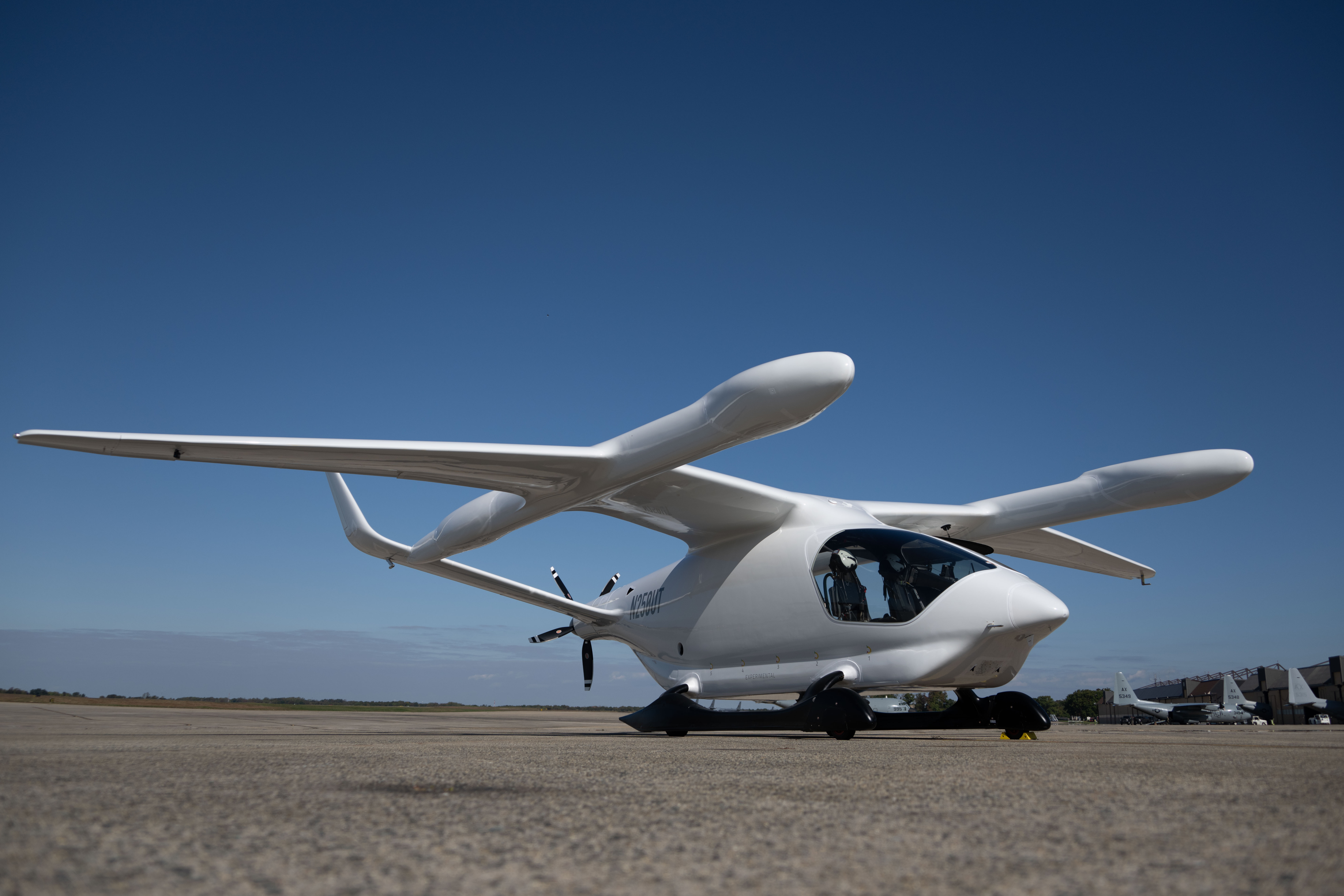
First Alia A250 prototype in CTOL configuration with vertical lift rotors removed.

After several months of ground and tethered vertical flight testing at Beta Technologies' headquarters in Burlington, Vermont, the Alia A250 was airlifted to Plattsburgh, New York in June 2020 for advanced flight testing. In March 2021, the A250 made a test flight from Plattsburgh, across Lake Champlain, and back to Burlington.

In May 2021, the US Air Force's Public Affairs office announced that Beta Technologies was granted the Air Force's first airworthiness certificate as a part of the AFWERX Agility Prime program, allowing the military to begin using the company's aircraft for test flights. In July, the company completed a 205 mi (330 km) crewed flight of its aircraft, its longest flight up to that point.

The company announced on January 31, 2022, that it had won a US Army contract to support flight testing of its Alia electric vertical takeoff and landing aircraft. The partnership is designed to help the Army test specific military cargo and logistics missions for eVTOLs, while allowing Beta to accelerate development for both military and civil applications. Initially, Army engineers and Beta's team would evaluate how Alia might best be applied to specific missions by measuring its range, altitude, endurance, and payload limits. In March 2022, the company hosted the United States Air Force and USAF test pilots flew the Alia aircraft for the first time.

In May 2022, an Alia aircraft completed a flight of 1,400 mi (2,300 km) in total, from New York State to Arkansas. This included stops along the way for recharging on the company's network. In December, an Alia completed another test flight after traveling 876 mi (1,410 km) to UPS Worldport, where its founder was met by US Secretary of Transportation Pete Buttigieg.

In March 2023, the company sought FAA certification for the Alia CX300 and had received orders for the new product from Bristow, Air New Zealand, and United Therapeutics. The company said that FAA test pilots had flown the aircraft during a qualification evaluation earlier that year.

In April 2024, the Alia A250 aircraft completed a piloted transition, going from hover to wing-borne flight and then back to hover before landing. In July, the Alia completed several military exercises in collaboration with the Department of Defense, for the Air Force and Air National Guard, including cargo transport and a medivac simulation.

In November 2024, Beta was granted a multipurpose special airworthiness certificate by the FAA for its first CX300 production aircraft which then performed its maiden test flight with CEO Kyle Clark at the helm. In April 2025, the first CX300, registered as N916LF, conducted a six-week demonstration tour of the US. It departed from the company’s test facility in Plattsburgh, New York, flew through snowstorms and desert heat, then returned to South Burlington, Vermont. One leg of the trip involved landing at the busy Hartsfield–Jackson Atlanta International Airport under instrument flight rules. In June, N916LF made the first electric-powered passenger-carrying flight in the US by taking four people from East Hampton, Long Island to New York’s John F. Kennedy International Airport.

In May 2025, an Alia CX300 aircraft completed the first fully electric piloted flight in Ireland at Shannon Airport. This marked the beginning of a European demonstration tour, ending with the aircraft's delivery to a customer in Norway.

In August 2025, Bristow Norway began trials in a low-emissions test arena.

In October 2025, Air New Zealand began trials with the Alia CX300. Using a aircraft leased from Beta Technologies, the airline conducted a series of test flights in various conditions and altitudes. That same month, an Alia CX300 won the inaugural Pulitzer Electric Aircraft Race, in which it competed against six Pipistrel Velis Electro trainers.

In March 2026, Beta Technologies and Loganair conducted a demonstration flight along the airline's Glasgow to Dundee route. Shortly thereafter, the two companies conducted a series of demo flights for Royal Mail.

=== Orders ===
In April 2021, United Parcel Service (UPS) entered into a contract for ten A250 aircraft to be supplied in 2024, which included the option for UPS to acquire up to 150 more aircraft. UPS announced it planned to have them travel directly to and from UPS facilities, rather than use airports. That same month, Blade Urban Air Mobility made a commitment to purchase up to 20 Alia aircraft, becoming Beta's first passenger service company.

In April 2022, aircraft lessor Lease Corporation International placed an order for fifty Alia aircraft, and in August that year, vertical lift aircraft operator Bristow Helicopters ordered five Alia A250s with options for an additional fifty.

By the end of 2024, Metro Aviation had placed an order for 20 Alia aircraft, as one of the first air medical service providers in the US to add eVTOL aircraft to its fleet. That same year, Air New Zealand agreed to order up to 23 CX300 aircraft. The New Zealand Air Ambulance Service had also ordered two A250s.

== Variants ==
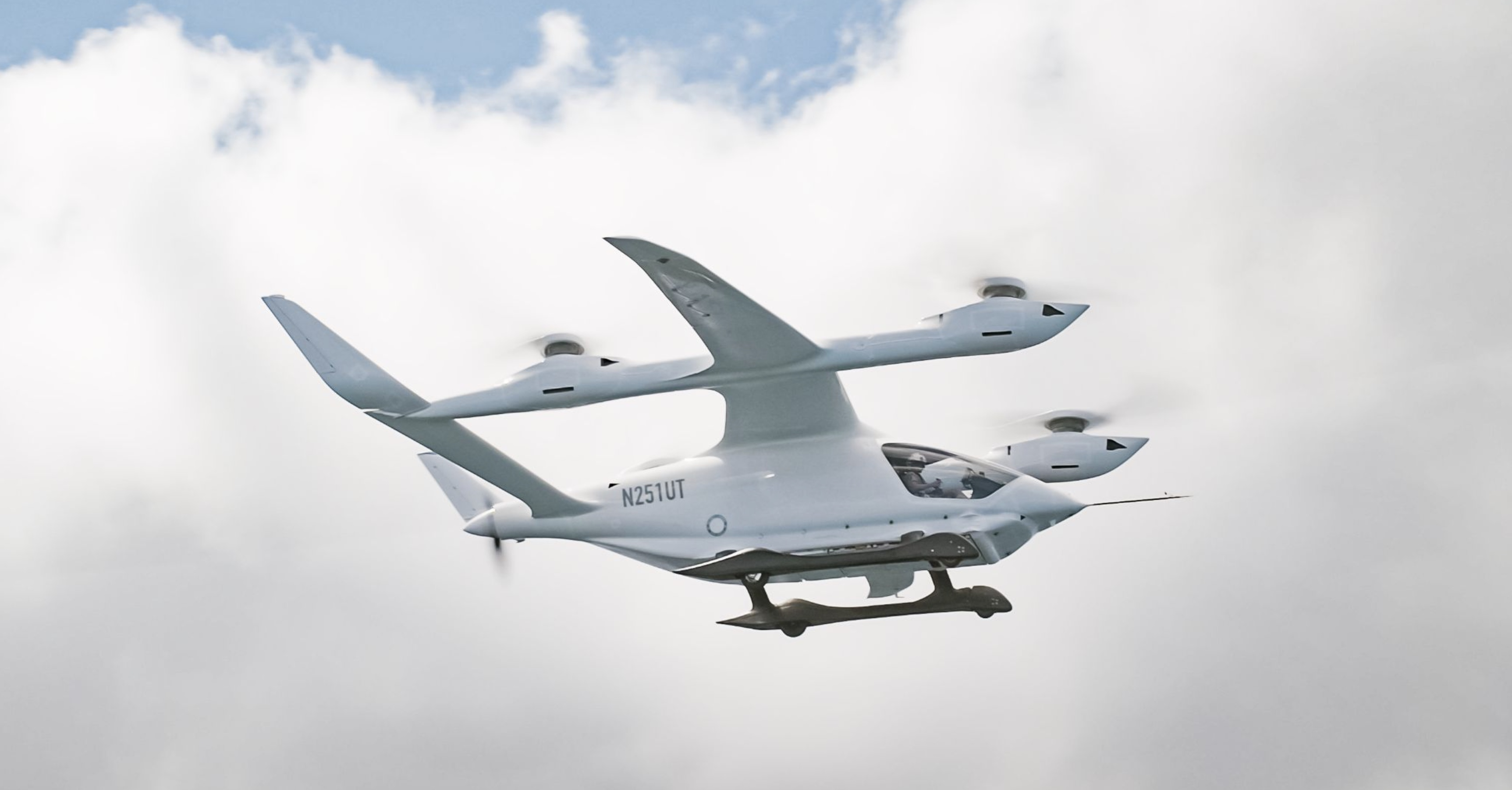
Second A250 prototype in vertical flight

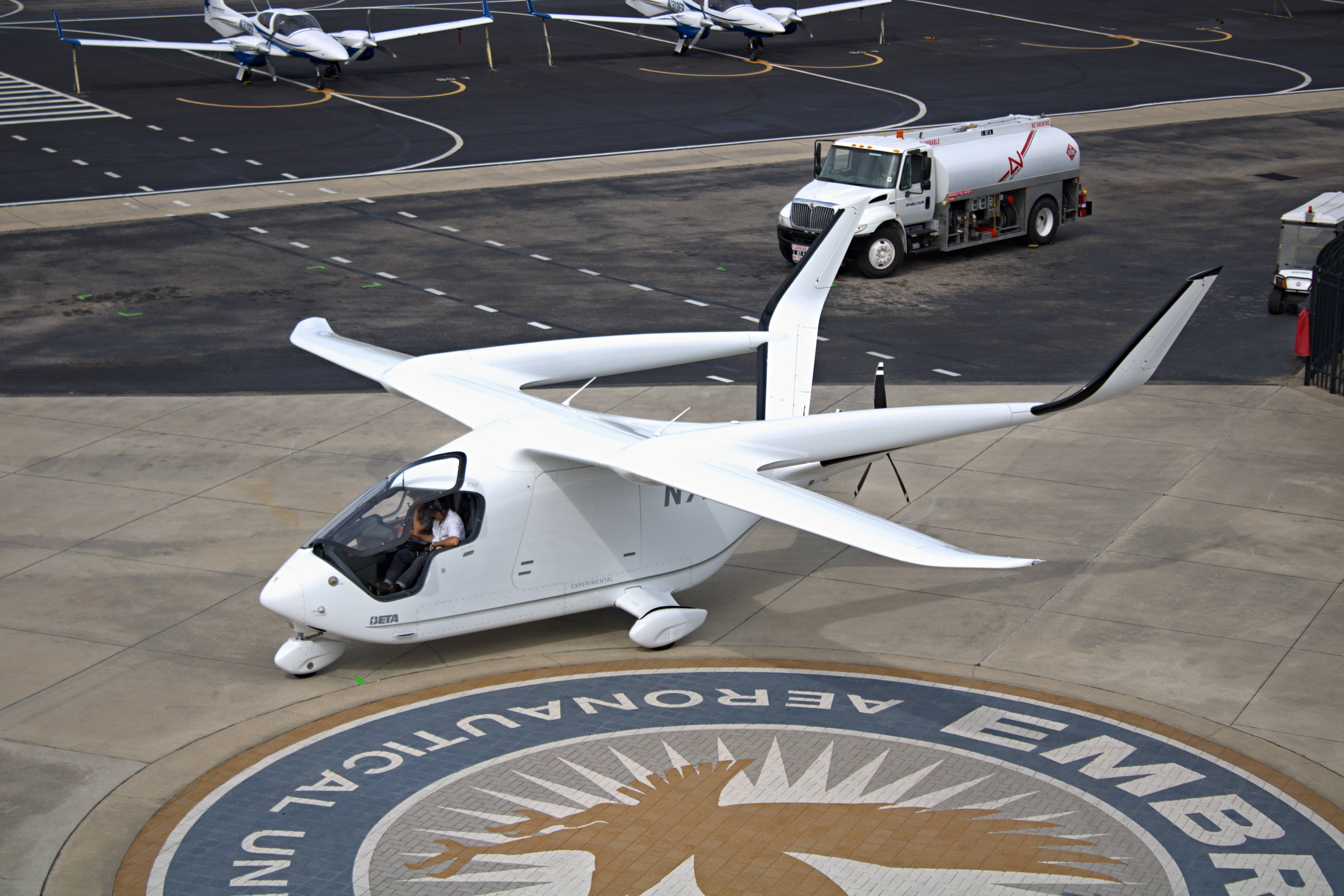
First production Alia CX300

Alia A250
The A250 is an all-electric vertical take-off and landing gyrodyne that uses four twin boom-mounted lift rotors and one rear pusher propeller, which allow the A250 to perform quadcopter-like vertical flight and hovering, and normal wing-borne forward flight while in cruise. It is designed to charge in under an hour, and carry five passengers or 200 ft^{3} (5.7 m^{3}) of cargo for a range up to 250 nmi (460 km; 290 mi), which is the basis for the model number. The design of the 50 ft (15 m) wing was inspired by the arctic tern, a migratory bird known for its long flights. Its engines provide separate lift and thrust, as opposed to the tilt-rotor design of the Ava, with a planned maximum range of 250 nmi (460 km; 290 mi) at a weight of 6,000 lb (2,700 kg) and a cruise speed of 170 mph (270 km/h). In April 2024, this design achieved a switch from vertical to normal flight.

Alia CX300
The CX300 is an all-electric conventional take-off and landing light aircraft that is designed to charge in under an hour, and can be used in passenger, cargo, medical, or military configurations. The aircraft is powered by only one rear-mounted pusher propeller driven by an H500A electric motor, while relying on the same 50 ft (15 m) wing to generate aerodynamic lift.

MV250
The MV250 is a proposed unmanned autonomous military variant based on the A250. Unlike the civilian models, the MV250 will be a hybrid electric aircraft and is expected to have a range of over 1,000 nmi (1,900 km; 1,200 mi).

== Operators ==
Norway

- Bristow Norway

== Specifications (Alia CX300) ==
Data from

General characteristics

- Crew: 1
- Capacity: 5 passengers or 200 cu ft (5.7 m^{3}) of cargo
- Wingspan: 50 ft (15 m)
- Powerplant: 1 × Beta Technologies H500A electric motor
- Propellers: 5-bladed Hartzell Propeller fixed pitch propeller

Performance

- Maximum speed: 176 mph (283 km/h, 153 kn)
- Range: 387 mi (622 km, 336 nmi)

== See also ==
Aircraft of comparable role, configuration, and era

- Wisk Cora

Related lists

- List of electric aircraft
