= Kanika Tekriwal =

Indian entrepreneur

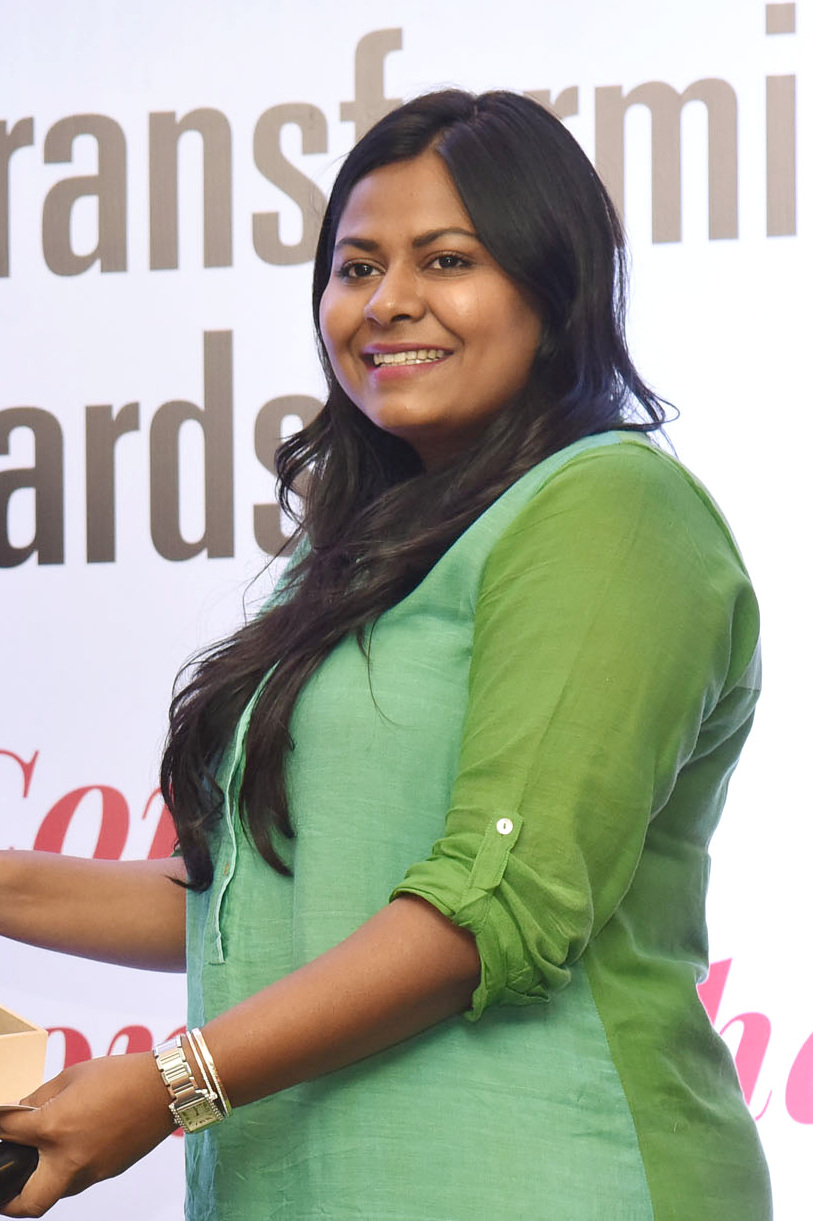

Kanika Tekriwal (born 7 June 1992) is an Indian entrepreneur, founder and the Chief executive officer of JetSetGo. In 2021 she was recognized as the youngest richest woman in India. She is also the founder of India's first aircraft leasing organization.

== Early life and education ==
She was born into a Marwari family. Kanika's childhood was shaped by her father’s keen interest in finance. Yet her family emphasized on the importance of education and the potential of marrying into a wealthy family as part of her future.

Kanika received her education at Lawrence School, Lovedale and completed part of her schooling at Jawaharlal Nehru Senior Secondary School in Bhopal, the hometown of her parents. She later graduated from Coventry University.

She is currently the owner of ten private jets. In early 20s, she was diagnosed with cancer but after beating it, in 2012, Kanika founded JetSetGo, a private jet management company. Her net worth is estimated at 420 crore.

She is listed among the youngest richest woman in Hurun Rich List. Her company handles 100,000 passengers and has operated 6,000 flights.

== Awards and honors ==
- BBC 100 Women
- Forbes 30 Under 30
- Women Transforming India by United Nations
- National Entrepreneurship Award by Government of India
- Young Global Leaders by World Economic Forum
- Felicitated during an event by Ministry of Civil Aviation, Government of India
- Got title of "The Sky Queen" by Entrepreneur
