= UPS Flight Forward =

Drone delivery subsidiary of UPS

UPS Flight Forward Inc. is a wholly owned subsidiary of UPS (United Parcel Service) focused on drone delivery. The company was formally launched in July 2019, and on October 1, 2019, became the first company to receive the Federal Aviation Administration's full Part 135 Standard certification, allowing the company to operate an unlimited remote-controlled drone delivery network in the United States.

== History ==
=== Partnership with Matternet ===
In March 2019 UPS partnered with drone startup Matternet, to start delivering medical samples via unmanned drones at WakeMed's hospital in Raleigh, N.C. With the approval of the FAA and the North Carolina Department of Transportation, UPS and Matternet planned to conduct daily routine flights transporting medical samples or specimen, such as blood samples. The drones would be loaded by medical professional at the origin facility, then the drone would fly along a predetermined route to a fixed landing pad at WakeMed's main hospital and central pathology lab.

=== Formation of a dedicated subsidiary and FAA 135 Standard certification ===
In July 2019 UPS announced formation of a wholly owned subsidiary called UPS Flight Forward Inc. that would focus on parcel delivery by drones. As the first order of business, it applied for FAA certification. On October 1, 2019, UPS announced that UPS Flight Forward Inc. became the first company to receive FAA's full "Part 135 Standard certification". The certification permits operation of remotely controlled drone airline, unlimited in the number of drones and the number of hubs and able to fly at night.

== See also ==
- United Parcel Service, parent company
- UPS Airlines
- Wing
- Amazon Prime Air
- Advanced Air Mobility
