= Beta Technologies =

Vermont electric aircraft manufacturer

Beta Technologies, Inc.
- Type: Public
- Traded as: NYSE: BETA
- Industry: Aerospace
- Founded: 2017; 9 years ago
- Founder: Kyle Clark
- Headquarters: South Burlington, Vermont, United States
- Products: Electric aircraft and charging infrastructure
- Revenue: ▲US$35.6 million (2025)
- Net income: ▼ −US$746 million (2025)
- Number of employees: 800 (October 2024)
- Website: beta.team

Beta Technologies, Inc. (stylized as BETA Technologies), is an American aerospace manufacturer based in South Burlington, Vermont, known for developing electric vertical take off and landing (eVTOL) and electric conventional take-off and landing (eCTOL) fixed-wing aircraft for the cargo, medical passenger, and military aviation industries. The company has also developed a network of chargers which can supply power to their aircraft and other electric vehicles. Training programs for future electric aircraft pilots and maintainers are also provided.

The company was founded by Kyle Clark in 2017 and by late 2024 had more than 800 employees. Its CX300 production aircraft received special airworthiness certification from the FAA in November 2024. It made the U.S.'s first passenger-carrying flight by an electric aircraft in June 2025.

== History ==
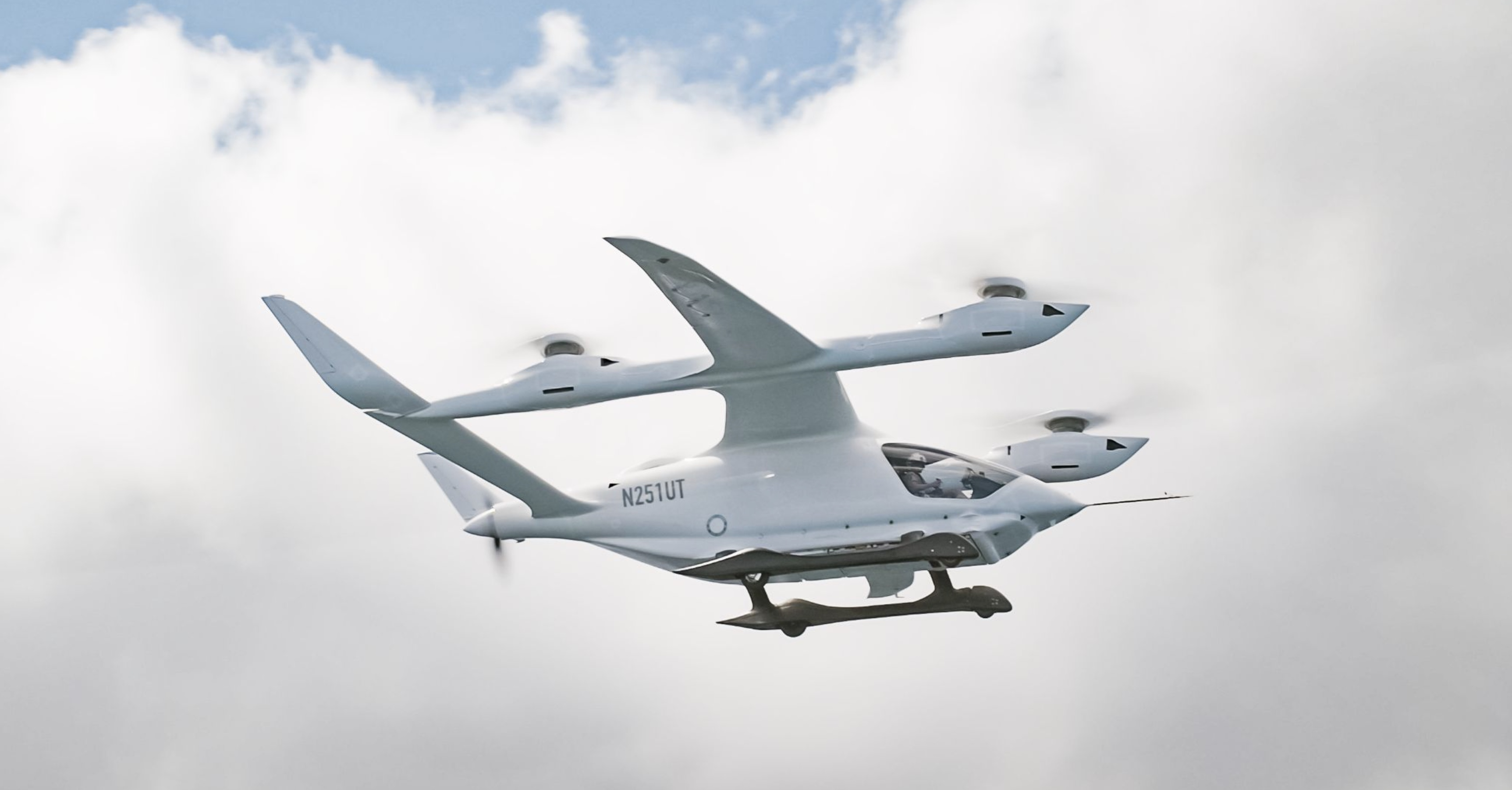
BETA Technologies’ A250 eVTOL prototype aircraft

Beta Technologies was incorporated in 2017 in Burlington, Vermont by Kyle Clark, an experienced pilot, engineer and entrepreneur. In order to become the company's first test pilot, he learned to fly helicopters, and earned FAA qualifications for a powered lift rating.

The company identified its first customer as United Therapeutics, which under founder and CEO Martine Rothblatt was looking for efficient transportation methods for organs intended for human transplant. United Therapeutics awarded Beta a $48 million contract.

On May 23, 2018, the company made the first tethered flight of its original 4,000 lb (1,800 kg) Ava XC eight motor, eight propeller battery-operated proof of concept aircraft.

The company came out of stealth in January 2019. That year, the Ava XC became the world's heaviest eVTOL aircraft to fly.

In February 2020, the company began participating in the United States Air Force Agility Prime program that seeks to advance electric air mobility. In May, the Air Force Life Cycle Management Center announced that the company, along with Joby Aviation, would progress to the third phase of the program. In June, the company unveiled its second aircraft prototype, ALIA A250.

In March 2021, the ALIA A250 made a test flight from Plattsburgh, New York, across Lake Champlain to Burlington, Vermont. In April, United Parcel Service (UPS) entered into a contract for ten A250 aircraft to be supplied in 2024, which included the option for UPS to acquire up to 150 more aircraft. UPS announced it planned to have them travel directly to and from UPS facilities, rather than use airports. In April, Blade Urban Air Mobility made a commitment to purchase up to 20 ALIA aircraft, becoming BETA's first passenger service company. In May, the U.S. Air Force's Public Affairs office announced that Beta Technologies was granted the Air Force's first airworthiness certificate as a part of the AFWERX Agility Prime program, allowing the military to begin using the company's aircraft for test flights. In July, the company completed a 205 mi (330 km) crewed flight of its aircraft, its longest flight up to that point. For longer-range military applications, a hybrid solution using an onboard diesel-powered electricity generator to supply the engines is under development. After a long deployment flight, for example, the generator could be detached and be used as a ground base to supply power for short flights.

The company announced on January 31, 2022, that it had won a U.S. Army contract to support flight testing of its ALIA electric vertical takeoff and landing aircraft. The partnership is designed to help the Army test specific military cargo and logistics missions for eVTOLs, while allowing Beta to accelerate development for both military and civil applications. Initially, Army engineers and Beta's team would evaluate how ALIA might best be applied to specific missions by measuring its range, altitude, endurance, and payload limits. In March 2022, the company hosted the United States Air Force and USAF test pilots flew the ALIA aircraft for the first time.

In April 2022, aircraft lessor Lease Corporation International placed an order for fifty ALIA aircraft, and in August that year, vertical lift aircraft operator Bristow Helicopters ordered five ALIA with options for an additional fifty.

In May 2022, an ALIA aircraft completed a flight of 1,400 mi (2,300 km) in total, from New York State to Arkansas. This included stops along the way for recharging on the company's network. The ALIA was included in X-Plane 12, desktop simulation software developed by Laminar Research, in October 2022.

In December 2022, an ALIA completed another test flight after traveling 876 mi (1,410 km) to UPS Worldport, where its founder was met by U.S. Secretary of Transportation Pete Buttigieg. The same month, the company completed a FAA-sponsored 50 ft (15 m) battery drop test with the National Institute of Aviation Research as part of crashworthiness determination for the eVTOL industry. Also in December, BETA was selected as one of four developers to be a part of Air New Zealand’s Mission Next Generation aircraft program.

By the end of 2022, the company had begun to repurpose an Energizer Battery plant in St. Albans, Vermont for use as its primary battery validation facility.

In March 2023, the company sought FAA certification for a conventional take-off and landing (CTOL) variant of its ALIA aircraft, dubbed the CX300, and had received orders for the new product from Bristow, Air New Zealand, and United Therapeutics. The company said that FAA test pilots had flown the aircraft during a qualification evaluation earlier that year. It also opened an office in Montreal.

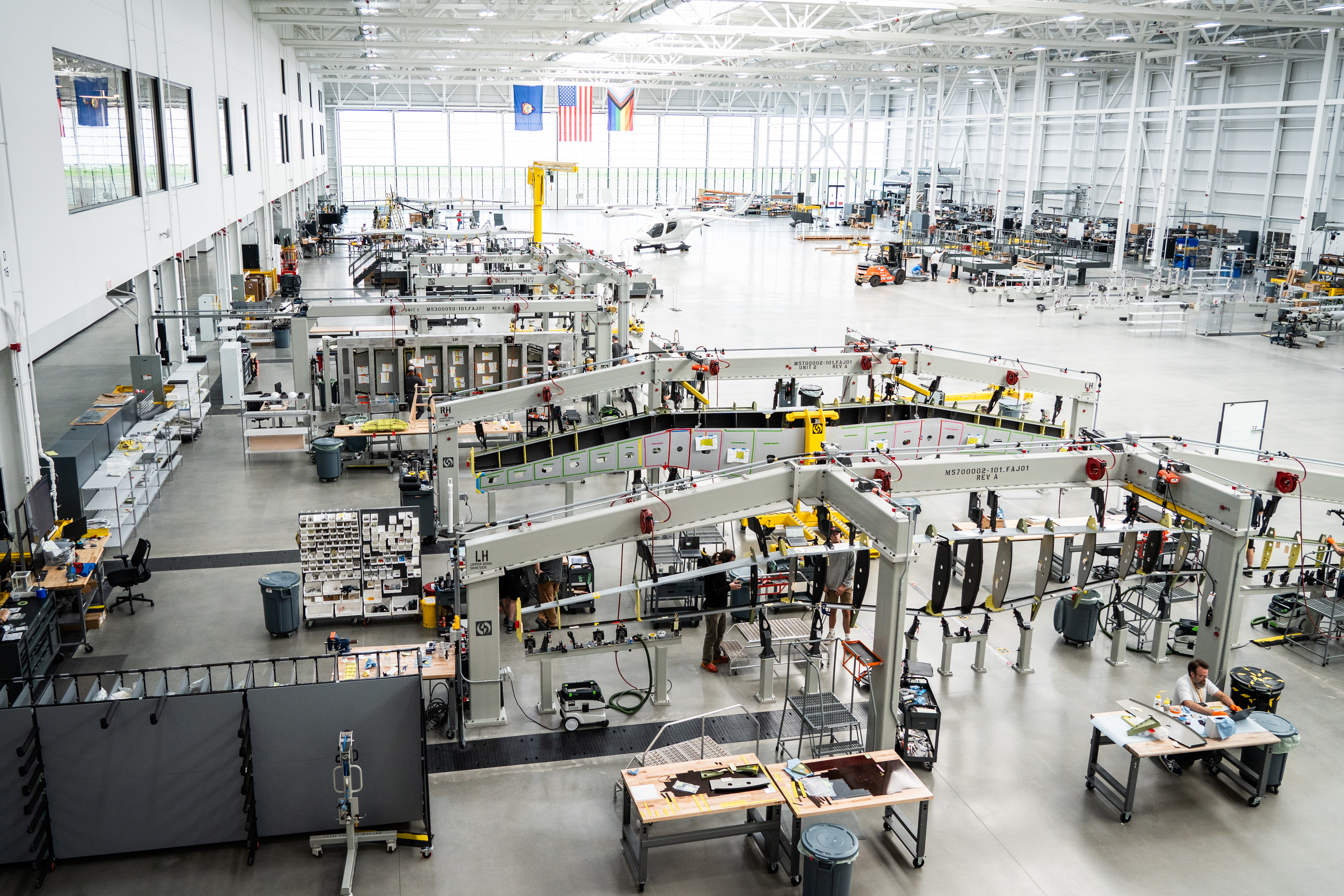
BETA Technologies’ final assembly and production facility in South Burlington, Vermont

In October 2023, the company opened a 188,500 ft^{2} (17,500 m^{2}) production facility at Burlington International Airport. This is reportedly capable of producing up to 300 aircraft per year, with a planned Phase II buildout intended to double in size.

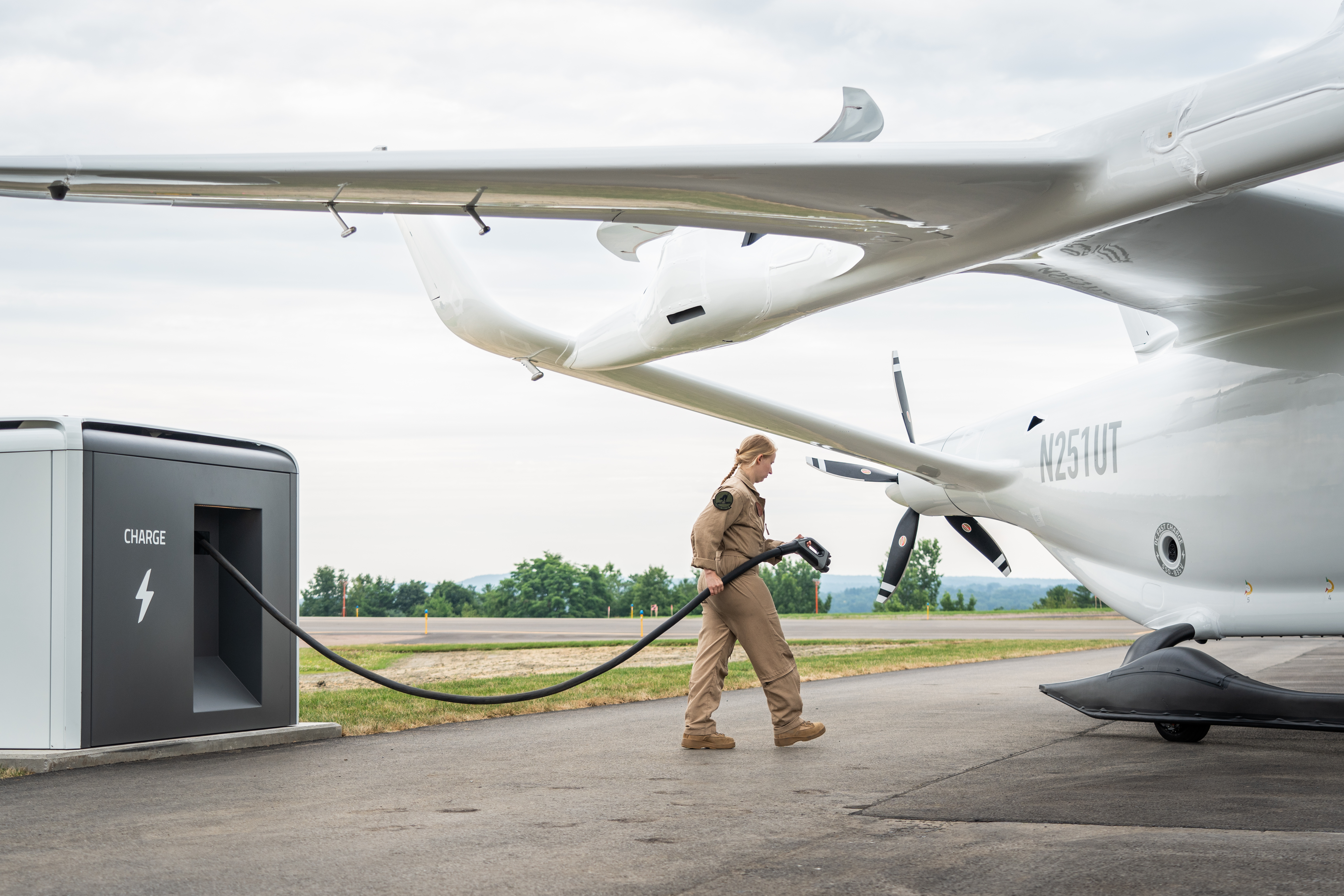
BETA Technologies’ 320 kW charge cube

In April 2024, the ALIA A250 aircraft completed a piloted transition, going from hover to wing-borne flight and then back to hover before landing. Also that month, the company announced that it had received certification for its 320 kW "charge cube" from the Underwriters Laboratory.

In July 2024, the company completed several military exercises in collaboration with the Department of Defense, for the Air Force and Air National Guard, including cargo transport and a medivac simulation.

In September 2024, the U.S. Department of Health and Human Services agreed a $20 million contract with the company to install its chargers at 22 sites across the East and Gulf coasts. Also that month, BETA unveiled the prototype of its five-passenger ALIA aircraft. and in October the company raised $318 million of new investment, led by Qatar's sovereign wealth fund, which brought its total capital to over $1 billion.

By the end of 2024, Metro Aviation had placed an order for 20 ALIA aircraft, as one of the first air medical service providers in the U.S. to add eVTOL aircraft to its fleet. The New Zealand Air Ambulance Service had also ordered two A250.

BETA was granted a multipurpose special airworthiness certificate by the FAA for its first CX300 production aircraft which then performed its maiden test flight with CEO Kyle Clark at the helm. BETA also became the first electric aircraft manufacturer to incorporate Garmin’s G3000 Prime avionics system into its aircraft. In April 2025, this aircraft conducted a six-week demonstration tour of the U.S., registered as N916LF. It departed from the company’s test facility in Plattsburgh, New York, flew through snowstorms and desert heat, then returned to South Burlington, Vermont. One leg of the trip involved landing at the busy Hartsfield–Jackson Atlanta International Airport under instrument flight rules. In June, N916LF made the first electric-powered passenger-carrying flight in the U.S. by taking four people from East Hampton, Long Island to New York’s John F. Kennedy International Airport.

In May 2025, an ALIA CX300 aircraft completed the first fully electric piloted flight in Ireland at Shannon Airport. This marked the beginning of a European demonstration tour, ending with the aircraft's delivery to Bristow Norway, who then began test flights between Stavanger and Bergen. In October of that year, Air New Zealand also began test flights of a CX300 based at Hamilton Airport. This four-month program using 12 airports completed over 13,000 kilometres (7,000 nmi) of cargo flights. The Norwegian testing ended in January 2026 after over 100 flights with cargo had used a charging infrastructure adapted to winter conditions there.

Beta Technologies completed its initial public offering on the New York Stock Exchange under the ticker symbol "BETA" in November 2025, raising over $1 billion and valuing the company at around $7.4 billion.

In Scotland in March 2026, Loganair and Royal Mail trialled an ALIA CX300 for postal deliveries to Orkney and other Scottish islands.

== Technology ==
eVTOL aircraft can take off and land without the use of a runway, allowing smaller loads to be delivered directly to recipients, whereas eCTOL require conventional, runway-dependent operations. The company’s eVTOL and eCTOL (fixed wing) aircraft share many design features: both are powered by the same internally-developed electric pusher motor, which in December 2025 BETA agreed to supply to Eve Air Mobility, a Brazilian manufacturer.

The company uses electric motors as they are reportedly quieter and have a smaller carbon footprint with zero operational emissions compared to an equivalent gasoline engine. Electric propulsion aircraft also require less maintenance. The company claims they are also more efficient than combustion engines and have constant torque across all speeds, which enables control without helicopter-like complexity. The motors run from lithium-ion batteries. To allow larger payloads, especially in military eVTOL applications, BETA has partnered with GE Aerospace to develop a hybrid-electric turbogenerator based on the T700/CT7 turboshaft.

Both ALIA models use a five-bladed pusher propeller developed in a collaboration with Hartzell Propeller. This has FAA part 35 certification for use in advanced air mobility applications.

== Products ==
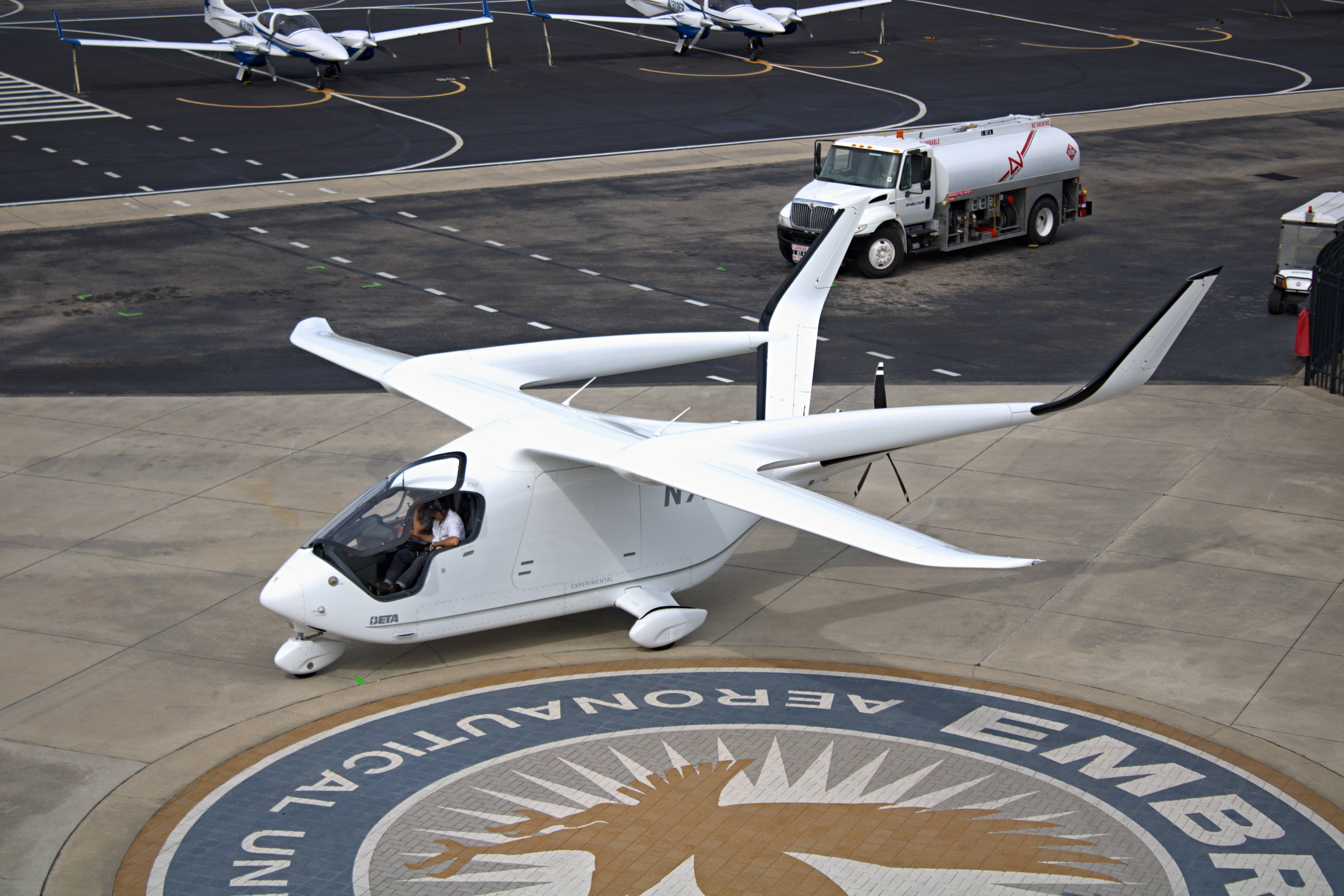
ALIA CX300

Beta Technologies develops electric aircraft and a network of charging stations to support them.

- ALIA A250 – The A250 is an all-electric vertical take-off and landing aircraft that uses four top-mounted lift motors and one rear pusher motor to achieve vertical capabilities as well as wing-borne flight while in cruise. It is designed to charge in under an hour, and carry five passengers or cargo for up to 250 NM (460 km; 290 mi), which is the basis for the model number. The design of the 50 ft (15 m) wing was inspired by the arctic tern, a migratory bird known for its long flights. Its engines provide separate lift and thrust, as opposed to the tilt-rotor design of AVA, with a planned maximum range of 250 NM (460 km; 290 mi) at a weight of 6,000 lb (2,700 kg) and a cruise speed of 170 mph (270 km/h). In April 2024, this design achieved a switch from vertical to normal flight.
- ALIA CX300 – The CX300 is an all-electric conventional take-off and landing aircraft that is designed to charge in under an hour, and can be used in passenger, cargo, medical, or military configurations. The aircraft is powered by one rear-mounted pusher motor and its lift is created by the same 50 ft (15 m) wing. A CX300 participated in the 2025 Paris Air Show, becoming the first electric aircraft to fly in that show’s history. In a revival of the Pulitzer Trophy Races in October 2025, a CX300 claimed a world record in its weight and propulsion category, for speed over a 15 kilometres (9.3 mi) course. It beat six other teams in a separate race over a 44 miles (71 km) triangular course, with an average speed of just under 133 knots (153 mph).
- Charging infrastructure – Beta developed a line of purpose-built chargers to support the deployment of electric aircraft. By January 2025, the company had opened 46 sites, with 23 others in development. All Beta chargers can work with ground based electric vehicles in addition to electric aircraft. The company also develops elevated landing pads that, when coupled with chargers, provide an off-airport landing option.

== See also ==
- Electric aircraft
- VTOL
