= Eve Air Mobility =

Brazilian aerospace company

- Type: Public
- Traded as: NYSE: EVEX
- Industry: Aerospace, Advanced Air Mobility
- Founded: 15 October 2020; 6 years ago
- Headquarters: São José dos Campos, São Paulo, Brazil
- Key people: Johann Bordais (CEO)
- Products: eVTOLs, Urban air mobility infrastructure
- Parent: Embraer
- Website: eveairmobility.com

Eve Air Mobility is a Brazilian company that develops electric vertical take-off and landing (eVTOL) aircraft and urban air mobility infrastructure. EVE is a brand that was idealized by the innovation division of Embraer called EmbraerX.

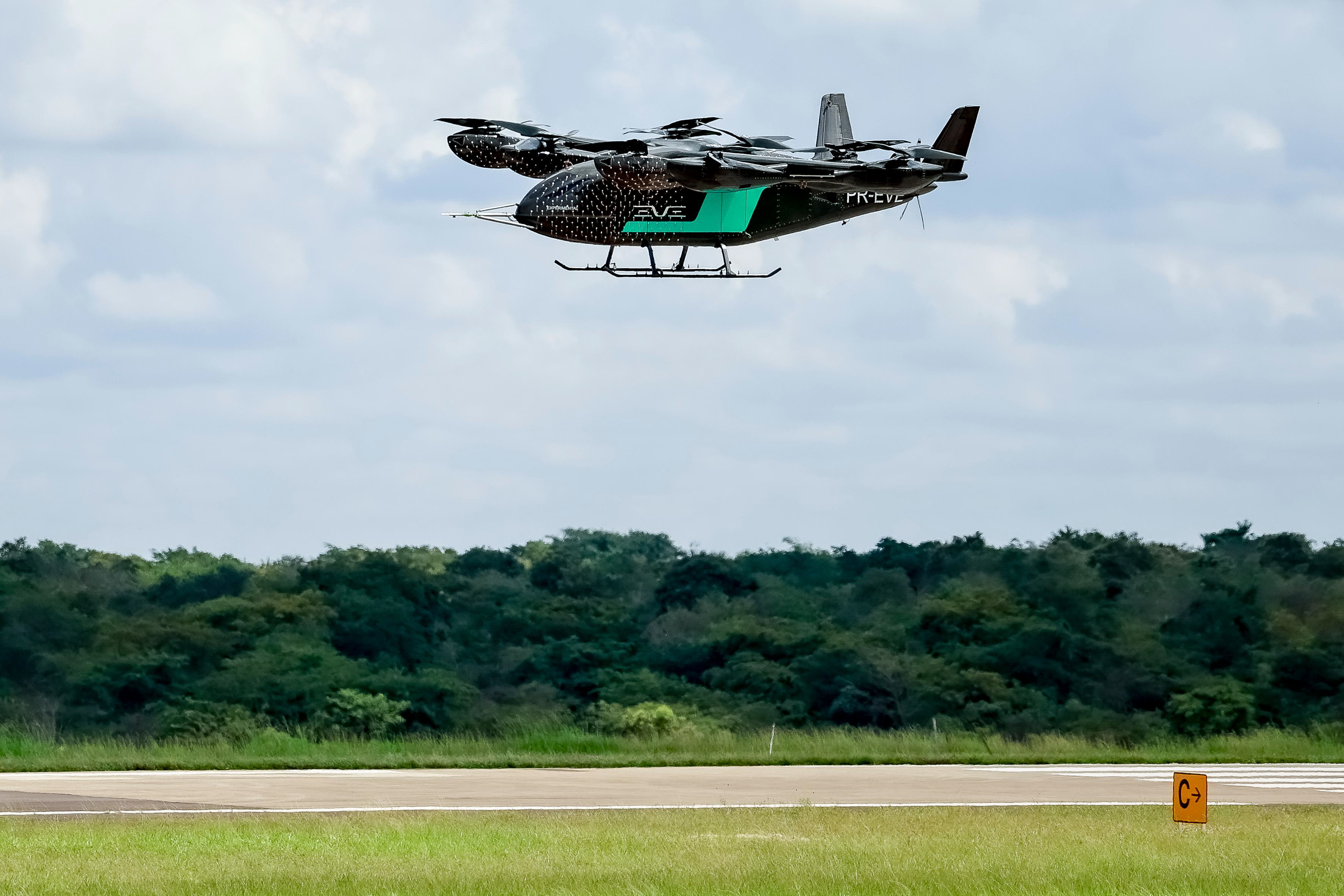
Embraer EVE prototype in flight, March 2026

== Vision ==
Eve's objective is to accelerate the creation Urban Air Mobility (UAM) solutions. The first project is the eVTOL EVE.

== History ==
The concept was presented to the public on 8 May 2018, before the creation of the company.

The company was founded on 15 October 2020.

The first simulator flight was conducted in Rio de Janeiro in September 2021. In the first months of 2022, the company was listed on NYSE priced at US$2.9 billion under the code EVEX in partnership with the American fund Zanite Acquisition Corp.

On 12 December 2021, Embraer and BAE Systems announced plans to embark on a joint study to explore the development of Eve's vehicle for the defence and security market. As of January 2022, Embraer had signed contracts with seventeen companies for 1,735 units, valued at US$5 billion.

On 10 February 2022, Embraer requested to National Civil Aviation Agency of Brazil (ANAC) the certification for the eVTOL EVE. In 2022, the company went public on the New York Stock Exchange following the company's merger with Zanite Acquisition Corp. In June 2023, Embraer announced the first production line of EVE in the city Taubaté, interior of the state of São Paulo, Brazil.

As of March 2024, Embraer had signed contracts with twenty-eight companies for 2,850 orders of eVTOLs, valued at US$8 billion from 30 customers in 13 countries. In 2024 Eve unveiled its first full-sized prototype during the UK's 45th Farnborough Airshow. It announced an additional US$94 million in funding to add to the $492 million it had already raised.

Embraer EVE's maiden flight was conducted in December 2025.

== Design ==
The aircraft uses 'lift & cruise' design similar to the Autoflight Prosperity. It has 8 propellers for vertical flight and a single pusher prop for cruising. The rear prop is driven by two motors for redundancy and performance. In December 2025, the company contracted to buy electric motors supplied by Beta Technologies.

This aircraft is designed for a 60-mile (100 km) range, carrying four passengers and one pilot.

Diehl Aviation is contracted as the interior designer and producer.

Eve plans capacity of 480 units per year, at four plants in Taubaté.

== Ownership and leadership ==
As of November 2023, Embraer held a 90% stake in EVE, while the rest of the shares are divided between investor companies such as United Airlines, SkyWest, Republic Airlines, and Rolls-Royce.
