= JoeBen Bevirt =

American entrepreneur

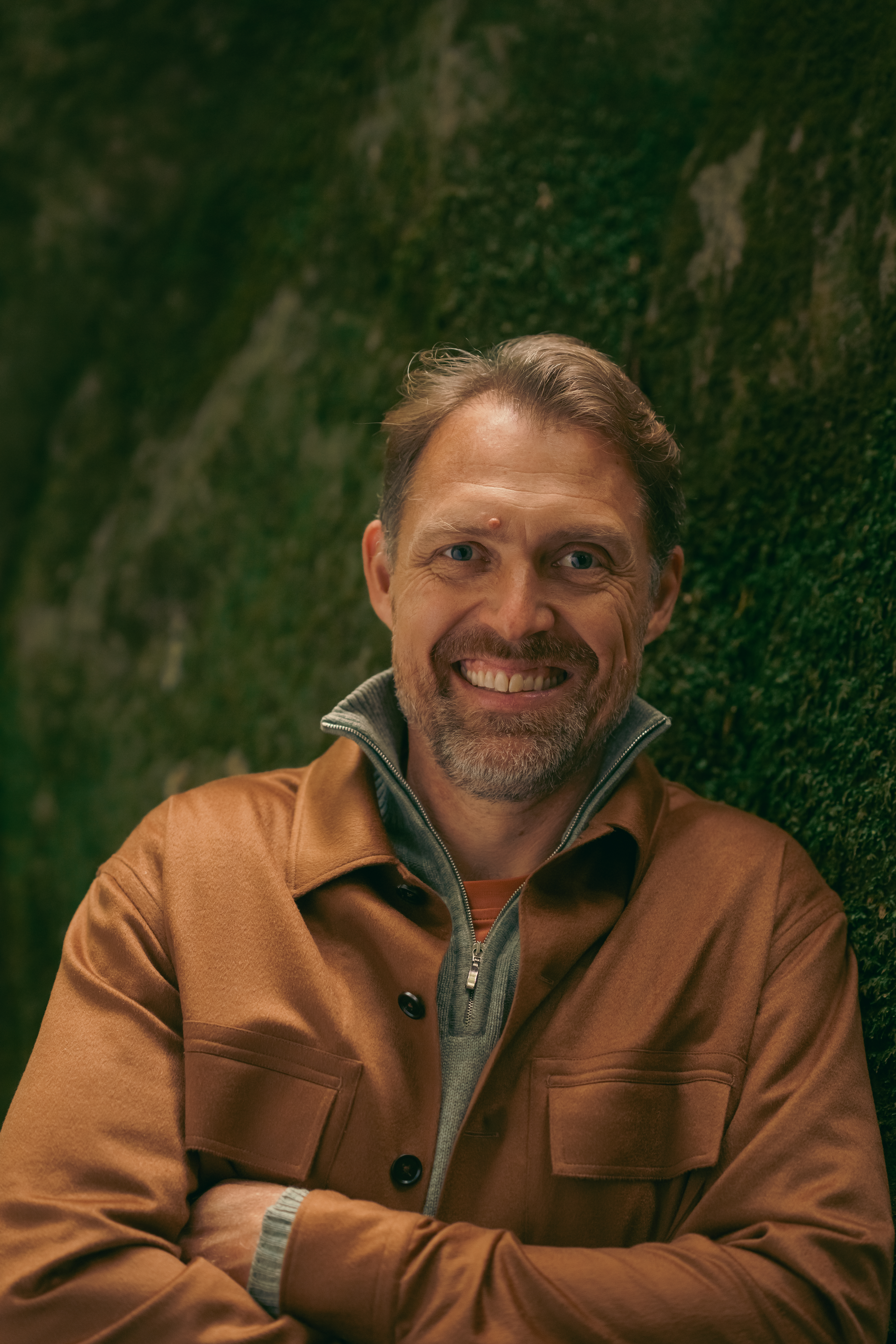
- Bevirt in 2023
- Education: B.S. in Mechanical Engineering from University of California, Davis, and M.S. in Mechanical Engineering from Stanford University
- Title: CEO of Joby Aviation
- Awards: 2018 Haueter Award for outstanding technical contribution to the field of VTOL aircraft development.

JoeBen Bevirt (born 1973 or 1974) is an American serial entrepreneur and the founder and the chief executive officer of Joby Aviation, a California-based aerospace company. He is the recipient of the 2018 Haueter Award and holds more than 160 U.S. patents in aerodynamics, aircraft design, electric and hydrogen propulsion.

== Early life and education ==
Bevirt was born to Paula Fry and Ron Bevirt. He was raised in the Last Chance community in Santa Cruz County, California. His name was inspired by the character JoeBen in his family friend Ken Kesey’s novel Sometimes a Great Notion.

Bevirt graduated from Santa Cruz High School in 1991. He holds a Bachelor of Science in Mechanical Engineering from University of California, Davis and a Master of Science in Mechanical Engineering from Stanford University.

== Career ==
Bevirt had been interested in engineering since his childhood and built one of the world’s first full-suspension mountain bikes while in high school. He co-founded Velocity11 in 1999 to develop robotic laboratory systems for life sciences discovery. The company was later acquired by Agilent Technologies in 2007.

In 2006, Bevirt founded Joby Inc., a consumer products company that developed the Gorillapod flexible camera tripod. Bevirt also started Joby Energy with a focus on airborne wind turbines.

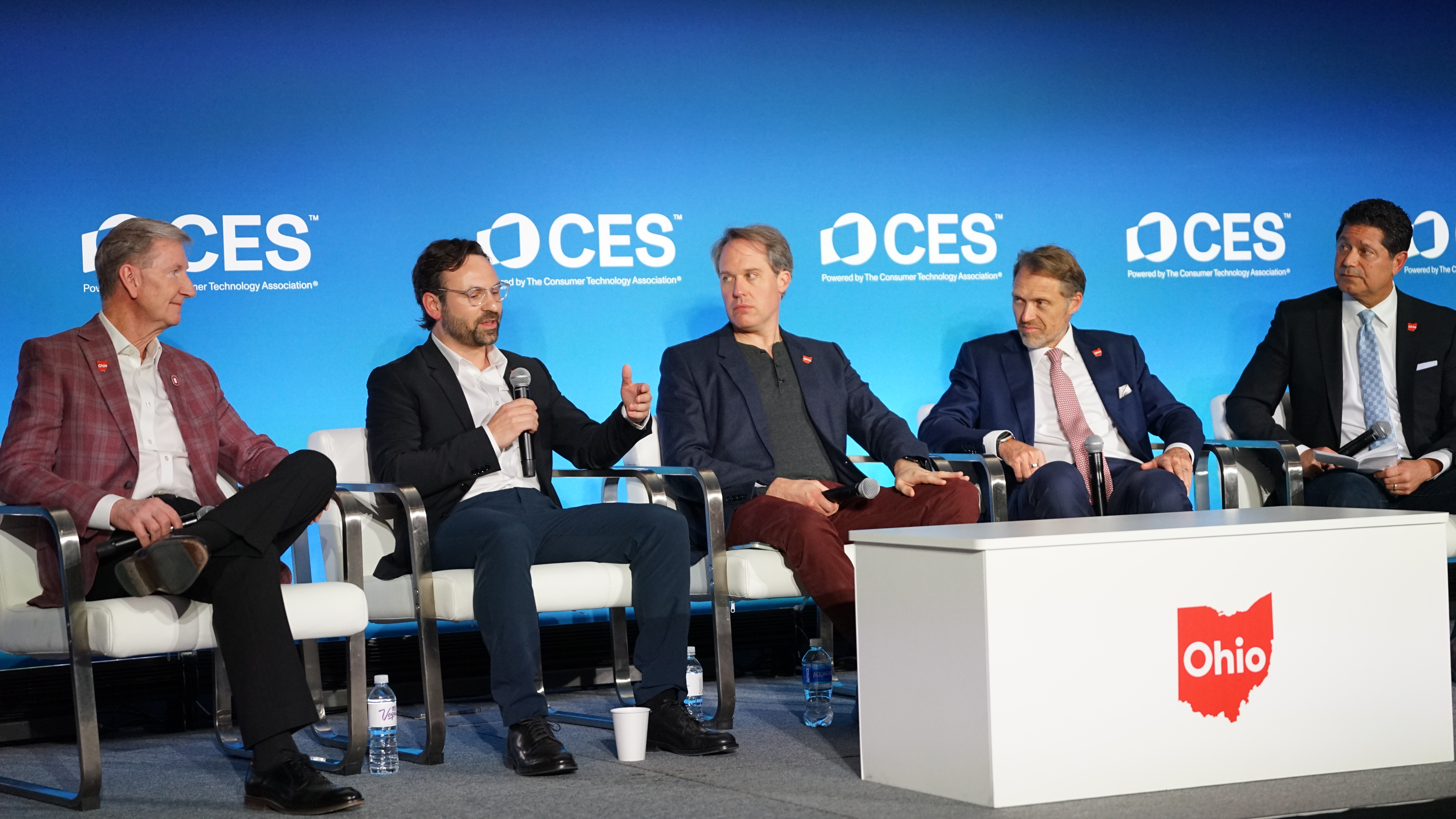
Ted Carter, Aaron Slodov, Jake DeWitte, Bevirt, J.P. Nauseef at CES 2026 for JobsOhio

In 2009, he founded Joby Aviation, a company pioneering the development of all-electric aircraft that can take off and land vertically, while cruising like a traditional airplane. In 2020, his company received a signed G-1 Certification Basis from the FAA and airworthiness certification from the US Air Force. On August 11th 2021, the company began trading on the New York Stock Exchange, making Bevirt the world’s first eVTOL billionaire according to media reports.

During the COVID-19 pandemic, Bevirt worked with the genetics team at the University of California, Santa Cruz to launch SummerBio, a company that provides affordable PCR tests.

In March 2022, Bevirt was invited to testify before the United States House Transportation and Infrastructure Committee during a hearing addressing concerns around aviation noise.

== Achievements ==
In 2018, Bevirt was announced as one of UC Davis’ ‘Most Distinguished Alumni’. He was also the 2018 recipient of the Paul. E. Haueter Award, presented by the Vertical Flight Society to recognize outstanding technical contributions to the field of vertical flight.

== Personal life ==
Bevirt lives in Santa Cruz with his wife, Jenny, and four children.
