= JetSetGo =

Indian private airline

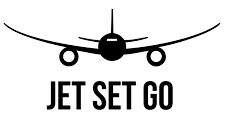
- Founded: 2014; 12 years ago
- Fleet size: 12
- Parent company: JetSetGo Aviation Services Private Limited
- Founder: Kanika Tekriwal Founder, CEO
- Website: https://jetsetgo.in/

JetSetGo Aviation Services Private Limited (d/b/a JetSetGo), is a private airline in India. It is the largest operator of private jets and helicopter fleets in India.

== History ==
In 2014, Kanika Tekriwal, along with co-founder Sudheer Perla, founded JetSetGo.

The concept was to establish India's initial marketplace for private aviation that is transparent, offering both executive jets and helicopters.

JetSetGo is now a major NSOP operator of private jets, focusing mostly on aircraft management and maintenance contracts. They offer services ranging from aircraft ownership and management to charter services and Membership programs for frequent flyers. Currently, the company is focusing on upcoming advanced air mobility options, such as electric and vertical take-off air taxis.

=== Leadership ===
Kanika Tekriwal is the founder and CEO of JetSetGo.

Sudheer Perla is the co-founder.

== Fleet ==
Aircraft	In service	Orders	Passengers	Year of manufacturing	Ref.
Bombardier Global 6000	1	—	14	2014	
Embraer Legacy 600	1	—	13	2008	
Gulfstream G200	1	—	8	2006	
Dassault Falcon 2000LX	1	—	8	2014	
Beechcraft Hawker 900XP	1	—	8	2009	
Beechcraft Hawker 800XP	1	—	8	2005	
Beechcraft Hawker 800XP	2	—	6	2006	
Beechcraft Hawker 750	1	—	6	2008	
Cessna Citation CJ2	1	—	6	2002	
Agusta A109	1	—	6	2015	
Agusta A109	1	—	5	2007	
Total	12	—			
