= Lilium Jet =

Proposed personal air vehicle

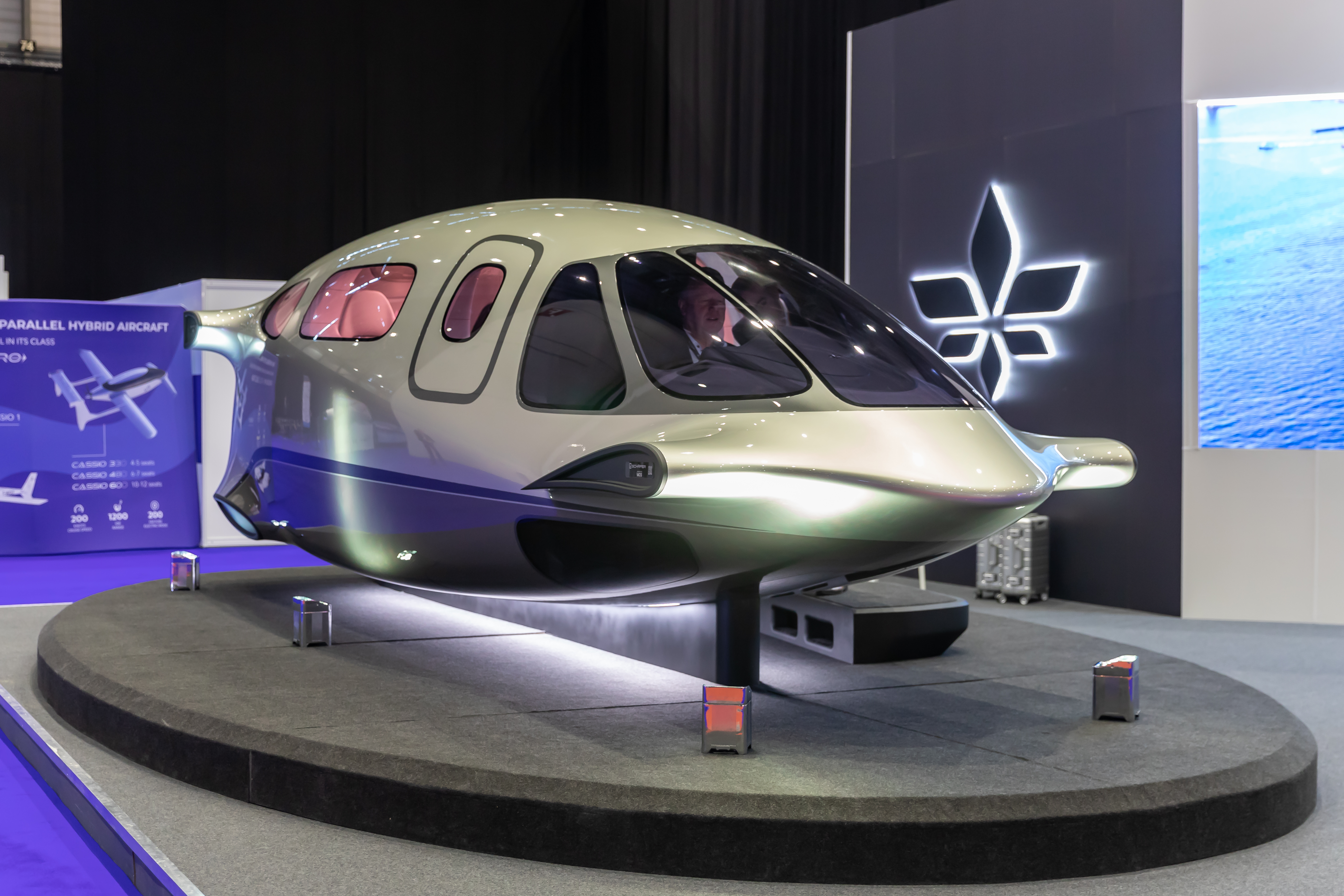
- Lilium Jet cabin demonstrator

General information
- Type: eVTOL
- National origin: Germany
- Manufacturer: Lilium GmbH
- Status: Insolvent

The Lilium Jet was a prototype German electric vertical take-off and landing (eVTOL) electrically powered airplane designed by Lilium GmbH. A seven-seat production version was planned.

== History ==
Initial design studies included forward-folding wings, so that the aircraft could be piloted as a VTOL and recharge in only few hours from a standard 240 V electrical outlet. A first half-scale demonstrator, Falcon, flew in 2015. The unmanned first flight of the two-seat Eagle full size prototype was on 20 April 2017 at the Mindelheim-Mattsies airfield, Bavaria, Germany.

Unmanned flight testing of the five-seat Lilium Jet took place at Oberpfaffenhofen airfield near Munich. It first flew in May 2019. By October 2019, after 100 flights, it could transition from vertical to horizontal flight, reaching over 100 km/h (54 kn), but not yet fully horizontal. It managed 25° banked turns, high ascent/descent rates like in operations, hover turns and sideward translations. Electrical, fan and flap failures were mitigated by the electrical and flight control systems.

The first prototype was destroyed by fire during maintenance on 27 February 2020. A second partially constructed prototype was undamaged. A further unfinished prototype was abandoned, and work begun on a seven-seat version.

On 18 July 2024 Saudia Group and Lilium N.V. signed a binding sales agreement for 50 Lilium Jets, with options for the purchase of 50 more.

At the end of October 2024, Lilium GmbH conceded insolvency. Lilium's situation was triggered by the denial of a guarantee for a 50 million-euro loan from the Kreditanstalt guaranteed by the State of Bavaria. By April 2026 the Lilium prototypes were scrapped.

== Design ==
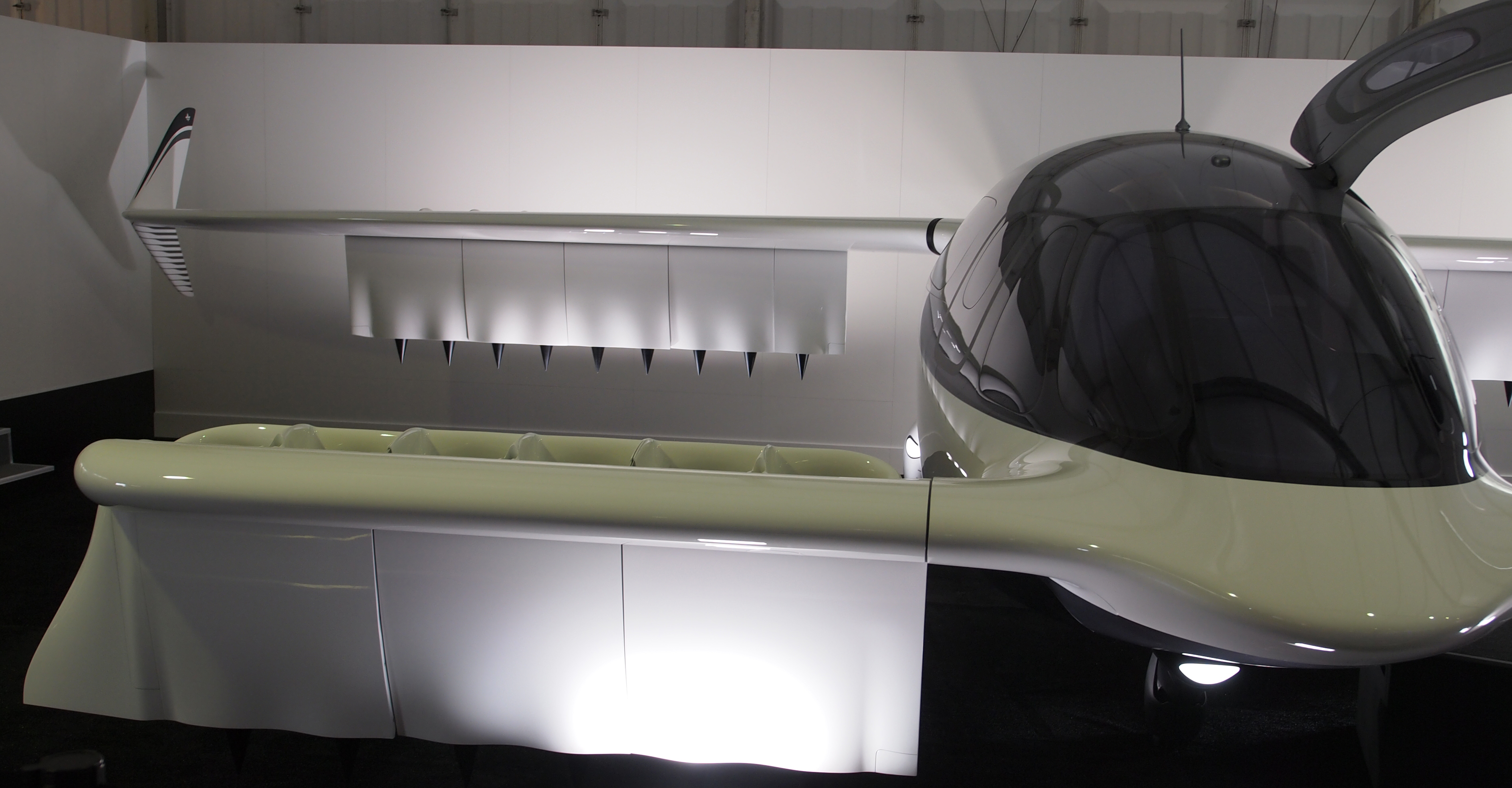
mock up

The Lilium Jet used multiple relatively small ducted propellers driven by electric motors to provide lift during take-off and landing, as well as thrust during the cruise phase. Lilium said that it referred to the propulsion system as a "jet" because the propellers were enclosed in nacelles. The production Lilium Jet was intended to accommodate six passengers and one pilot. It was powered by 36 electric motors, six on each of the two front canards and twelve on each rear wing. The motors were installed above twelve tiltable rear flaps. The drive-carrying flaps pivoted downwards for vertical launch. At the transition to the horizontal position, forward thrust was generated. This was claimed to be significantly more economical than a conventional rotorcraft; however, the propulsion configuration generated very high disc loading and power-delivery requirements significantly exceeded the leading competitive eVTOL designs.

Lilium invested in Ionblox for its silicon-dominant anode battery technology, which it believed offered uniquely high energy and power density (12C with 3.8 kW/kG at 50% charge and 3.0 kW/kG at 30%) needed for hover and take-off phases, even at low charge levels.

The target range was 280 km (150 nmi). Its 36 electric ducted fans were powered by a 1 MW (1,300 hp) lithium-ion battery; less than 200 hp (150 kW) was required to cruise.

== Specifications ==
Data from Lilium GmbH / Electric VTOL News by the Vertical Flight Society

General characteristics

- Capacity: 2-seater: 2 passengers, 200 kg (440 lb), 5-seater: 5 passengers (flown unmanned), 7-seater: 1 pilot, 6 passengers
- Empty weight: 970 lb (440 kg) 5-seater: 1,300 kg (2,900 lb), 7-seater: 3,100 kg (6,800 lb)
- Max takeoff weight: 1,411 lb (640 kg)
- Powerplant: 36 × Vertical Electric 320 kW total installed power

Performance

- Maximum speed: 190 mph (300 km/h, 160 kn)
- Cruise speed: 170 mph (280 km/h, 150 kn)
- Range: 190 mi (300 km, 160 nmi)

== Usage ==
The Lilium GmbH planned to found an air taxi service for urban air mobility and Advanced Air Mobility with the Lilium Jet. The company expected that pilots would be needed for around 10 years until autonomous flights could take over.

== Award ==
In October 2019 the Lilium five-seater Jet received a Red Dot Award: Design Concept for “Best of the Best”.

== See also ==
- Air taxi
- Flying car (aircraft)

Related development

- Airbus A³ Vahana
- Boeing Passenger Air Vehicle

Related lists

- List of electric aircraft
