= SkyDrive (company) =

Japanese aircraft company

SkyDrive is a eVTOL company based in Toyota City, Aichi Prefecture, Japan.

== History ==
SkyDrive was founded in 2018. It was preceded by eventual acquirer Cartivator, which began on work on flying cars in 2012. Cartivator was initially financed in part by Toyota.

The first test flight of the SD-02 came in August, 2020.

In 2022 the company entered a partnership with Suzuki.

== Organization ==
SkyDrive's CEO is Tomohiro Fukuzawa and the CTO is Nobuo Kishi.

== Vehicles ==
SkyDrive has flown small single-seat multicopter concept vehicles.

=== SD-02/3 ===
The SD-03 multicopter test vehicle stands on helicopter struts.

=== SD-XX ===
Its SD-XX concept model is a tandem two-seat design. It is a coaxial octocopter with a glass-covered cabin. Maximum takeoff weight is 500 kg (1,100 lb). Maximum altitude is 500 m (1,600 ft). Max speed is 100 km/h (62 mph). Flight time is 20 to 30 minutes.

It has three wheels that enable driving on roads. Two are beneath the cabin, and a third trails behind. Maximum driving speed is 60 km/h (37 mph). Range is 20 to 30 km (12 to 19 mi).

It is targeted at air taxi markets.

== Specifications ==
Data from the manufacturer

General characteristics

- Crew: one
- Capacity: two passengers
- Length: 4.00 m (13 ft 1 in) excluding propeller ring
- Width: 3.50 m (11 ft 6 in) including propellers
- Height: 1.50 m (4 ft 11 in)
- Empty weight: 475 kg (1,047 lb)
- Gross weight: 500 kg (1,102 lb)
- Powerplant: 18 × three-phase PM synchronous brushless DC electric motors

Performance

- Maximum speed: 100 km/h (62 mph, 54 kn)
- Service ceiling: 500 m (1,600 ft)
