= Lilium GmbH =

German aerospace company

Lilium Aerospace GmbH
- Type: Public
- Industry: Aerospace
- Founded: 2015; 11 years ago
- Founders: Sebastian Born; Matthias Meiner; Patrick Nathen; Daniel Wiegand
- Headquarters: Gauting, Bavaria, Germany
- Key people: Klaus Roewe (CEO) Giancarlo Moreira (Chair of the Board)
- Products: VTOL aircraft
- Number of employees: 950 (2024)
- Website: jet.lilium.com

Lilium Aerospace GmbH was a German aerospace company which is the developer of the Lilium Jet, an electrically powered personal air vehicle capable of VTOL flight.

== History ==
Lilium was founded in 2015 by four engineers and PhD students at the Technical University of Munich, Daniel Wiegand, Sebastian Born, Matthias Meiner and Patrick Nathen, and named after the aviation pioneer Otto Lilienthal.

The Lilium Eagle, an uncrewed two-seat proof of concept model, performed its maiden flight at the airfield Mindelheim-Mattsies near Munich in Germany on 20 April 2017. The Lilium Jet five-seater prototype Phoenix first flew in May 2019. The prototype was powered by 36 electrically powered jacketed-propellers mounted in movable flaps that can point down for vertical takeoff and gradually moved to a horizontal position to provide forward thrust. The five-seat Lilium Jet is capable of achieving a top speed of 300 km/h and targets a range of 300 km. In 2017, Lilium announced plans to launch a 5-seat Lilium Jet by 2025, aimed for the air taxi service market. At the beginning of 2019, Lilium held discussions with Switzerland's national rail company SBB on the use of the air taxi as a means of transport between the station and the home and a letter of intent was signed. In October 2019, Lilium released footage showing the Jet in full flight, taking off vertically and transitioning to horizontal flight. Lilium also announced the completion of its first manufacturing facility in October 2019. In November 2020, Lilium announced a partnership with the developer Tavistock Development Company to build a $25 million vertiport in Lake Nona, Orlando, Florida.

=== Financing and IPO ===
As of 2018, the registered office of Lilium GmbH was in Weßling (Wessling) near Gilching in Bavaria, Germany. Lilium completed a new financing round of $90 million in September 2017. From May 2018 to November 2019, the car designer Frank Stephenson was chief designer for Lilium. He previously worked for BMW and designed various sports car brands. Also in 2018, Arnd Mueller, previously Chief Brand Marketing Officer & GM Esprit Image GmbH-Member of the Executive Management Team, became VP Marketing of Lilium. He is to build the air taxi development company and its product into an international brand. In September 2018, Yann de Vries, formerly partner at Atomico, became the new VP of corporate development Lilium.

In July 2019, Lilium announced London, UK as its base to develop its software engineering team. The engineering team is led by Carlos Morgado, former chief technology officer of Just Eat. Luca Benassi, a former Airbus executive with experience at Boeing and NASA, has been named Lilium's chief development engineer. Yves Yemsi who worked as head of program quality for Airbus A350 aircraft has been hired as chief program officer. Dirk Gebser has joined as vice president of production.

In March 2020, Lilium raised $240 million in funding led by Tencent, with participation of previous backers such as Atomico, Freigeist and LGT. In January 2021 it was reported that Lilium was seeking to become a listed company via a special-purpose acquisition company (SPAC, also called a "blank check" company); the company completed a SPAC merger in September 2021. The company also confirmed it was redesigning its aircraft. Former Airbus CEO, Tom Enders, joined Lilium's board of directors in January 2021. In early June 2022 it was announced that Klaus Roewe would become CEO of Lilium on August 1, replacing Daniel Wiegand.

In late March 2021, Lilium announced a partnership with American aerospace supplier Honeywell during the SPAC IPO process. Honeywell is set to supply avionics components and also subscribe to shares in Lilium.

In July 2021, according to research by Welt am Sonntag, it became known that the company had to correct its balance sheet. After the recalculation, the startup loss for 2019 was no longer 42.8 million euros, but 75.4 million euros. A risk notice about the company's continuation was communicated. The merger with SPAC Qell took place in September 2021, and on September 15, Lilium N.V. was listed on NASDAQ for the first time.

In August 2021, the Brazilian airline Azul signed a letter of intent for 220 Lilium Jet seven-seaters.

=== Losses and insolvency ===
At the time of the IPO, the company had significant losses and no significant revenue; the loss for the fiscal year 2020 totaled 188 million euros. Nevertheless, the company was valued at $2.4 billion (after the addition of approximately 430 million euros in liquidity). For the year 2021, a cash outflow of 217 million euros and remaining liquidity of 400 million euros were reported.

In October 2022, the company reported a loss of 123.7 million euros for the first half of 2022. The total loss since the company's inception was estimated at 841 million euros. As of July 1, 2022, there was liquidity of approximately 230 million euros. In November 2022, the company secured an additional $119 million in financing through a capital increase and simultaneously forecasted a further uncovered capital requirement of $540 million until the planned market entry in 2025.

At the end of March 2023, the company reported a loss of 253 million euros for the fiscal year 2022. In April 2023, the company informed Handelsblatt that there was a funding gap of 300 million euros until the first flight in the second half of 2024, and that the subsequent test phase for certification would last until 2026. In May 2023, Lilium announced a capital increase of 227 million euros, with around $100 million reportedly coming from the Chinese internet giant Tencent. The company also stated that this sum would cover most of the costs until the first manned test flights. In July 2023, there was another capital increase of $192 million (approximately 171 million euros).

At the end of February 2024, the company reported a loss of 263 million euros for the fiscal year 2023. In March 2024, Wirtschaftswoche reported that losses had accumulated to 1.359 billion euros.

On 18 July 2024, Saudia Group and Lilium N.V. signed a binding sales agreement for 50 Lilium Jets, with options for the purchase of 50 more.

On 24 October 2024, after failing to settle an agreement with the Bavarian Government to secure a €50 million loan, the Lilium Board of Directors approved application for self-administration of its German subsidiaries. Two months later, on 20 December, Lilium ceased operations and laid off about 1000 workers.

=== Takeover by investor group ===
On 24 December 2024, it was announced that a consortium of investors, Mobile Uplift Corporation GmbH, would buy parts of the insolvent company. After the restructuring, 775 of 1,000 jobs lost would be retained.

In January 2025, Mobile Uplift expected the takeover to be completed in the first quarter of the year and announced that it would invest more than 200 million euros to finance Lilium until it entered the market.

On February 21, 2025, Severin Tatarczyk announced in internal communications that the company had filed for insolvency. The money that was promised by Marian Boček never materialized.

== Controversy ==
In January 2020 Aerokurier published a report which stated that Lilium might not achieve its aircraft performance goals, later backed up by four German aerospace academics who wrote that Lilium created clever PR tactics to attract investors. Lilium countered the Aerokurier article by claiming that the experts underestimated their hover drive efficiency at 20 percent, while asserting that industry norms for turbofan levels typically fall between 85 and 95 percent efficiency.

In February 2021, Forbes published an article citing several former employees who claimed that Lilium's aircraft development faced challenges during the flight test.

== Awards and recognition ==
- In 2018, Lilium was named as the management team of the year – industrial goods as the silver Stevie winner of the Stevie Awards.
- In July 2019, the Lilium five-seater Jet received a Red Dot Award: Design Concept for "Best of the Best".
- In 2019, Lilium was named second in LinkedIn Germany's 'Top Startups' list.
- In 2021, the Lilium Jet won the IF Gold Award in the discipline of Professional Concept.
- In 2024 Lilium design team received an award at the eVTOL Insights’ Global Advanced Air Mobility Awards: "Design Team of the Year"

== See also ==
- eVTOL
