= Kensington Roof Gardens =

Private roof garden in central London

The Roof Gardens
- The Roof Gardens; Derry and Toms Roof Gardens; Kensington Roof Gardens
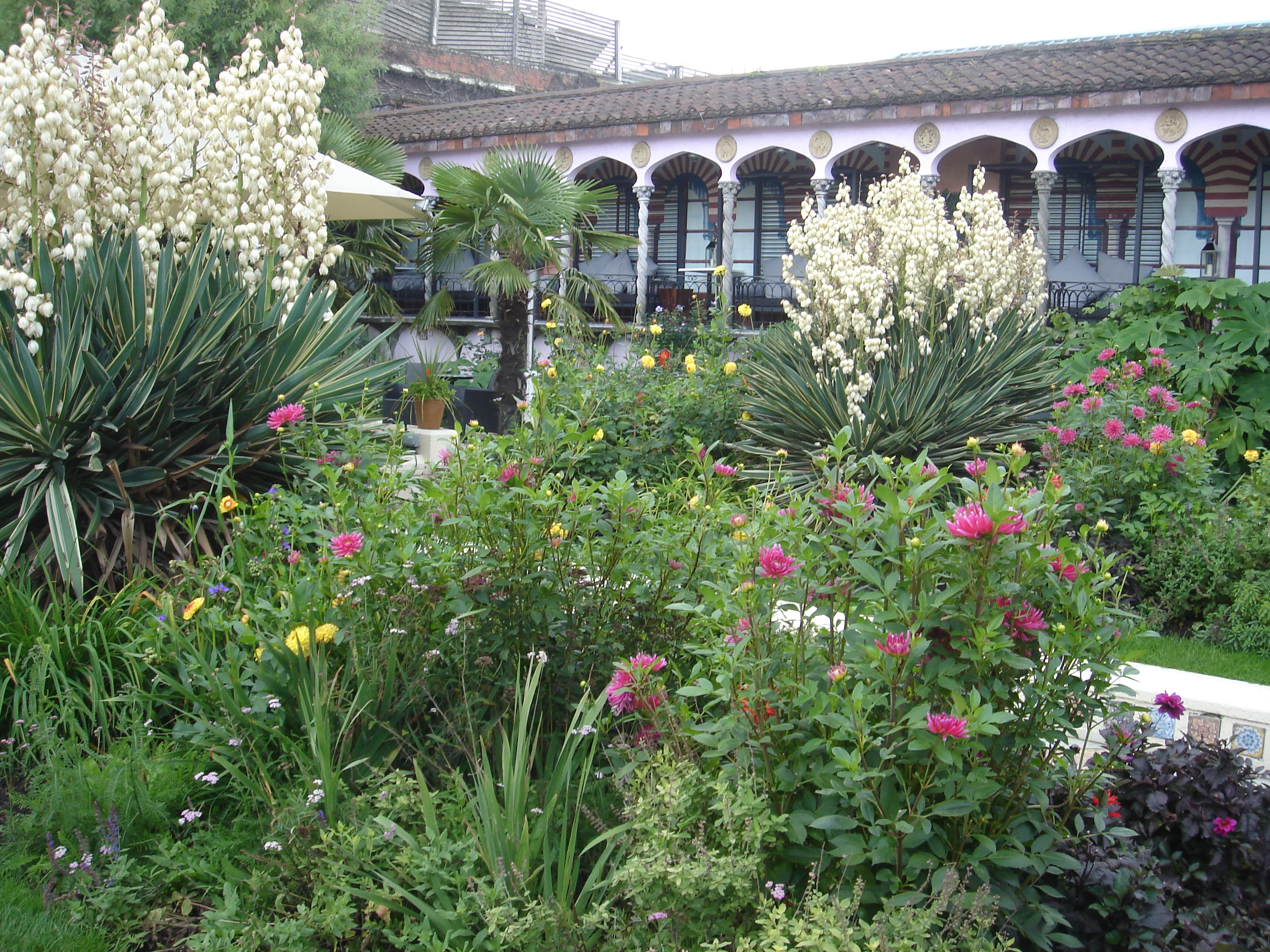

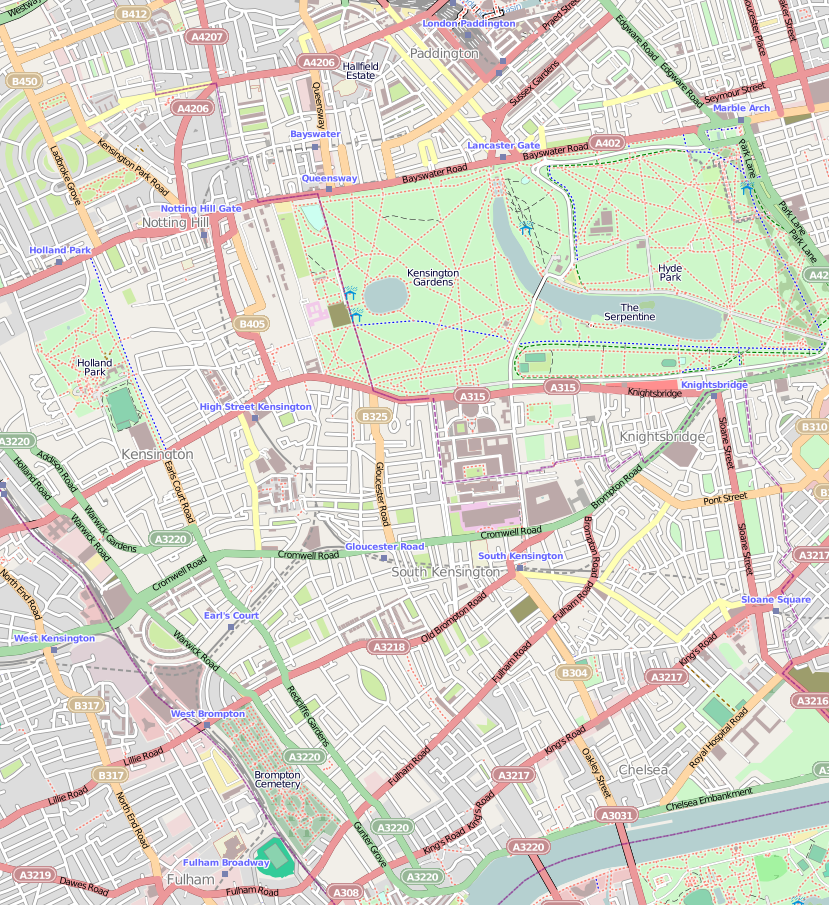
- Location within Kensington
- Type: Roof garden
- Location: Kensington High Street; London, W8; United Kingdom
- Coordinates: 51°30′4″N 0°11′31″W
- Area: 6000 m^{2}
- Created: 1936–1938
- Founder: Trevor Bowen
- Designer: Ralph Hancock
- Open: Members only
- Status: listed
- Designation: Grade II
- Public transit: High Street Kensington
- Website: www.theroofgardens.com

The Roof Gardens (formerly known as Kensington Roof Gardens) is a private roof garden covering 6,000 square metres (65,000 sq ft) on top of the former Derry & Toms building on Kensington High Street in west London.

Originally opened in 1938, the gardens were open to the public until January 2018 when the leaseholder, Virgin Limited Edition, was unable to reach an agreement with the freeholder about renewal of the lease.

As of 2026, the site hosts a private member's club/night club.

== History ==
Derry and Toms new Art Deco department store was opened in 1933. The gardens were laid out between 1936 and 1938 by Ralph Hancock, a landscape architect who had just created the "Gardens of the Nations" on the 11th floor of the RCA Building in New York, on the instructions of Trevor Bowen (then vice-president of Barkers, the department store giant that owned the site and constructed the building). They cost £25,000 to create and visitors were charged 1 shilling to enter. Money raised was donated to local hospitals and £120,000 was raised during the next 30 years.

The building housed the department store Derry and Toms until 1973, and then Biba until 1975. In 1978, the garden's Art Deco tea pavilion was redeveloped into a Régine's nightclub, in 1981 Virgin Limited Edition bought the lease to the roof garden and the pavilion, and in 2001 Virgin turned the pavilion into the Babylon restaurant.

The more than 100 trees in the garden were given a tree preservation order by Kensington & Chelsea council in 1976, the roof garden buildings were Grade II* listed by English Heritage in 1981 as part of a listing given the whole building, and the garden itself was given a Grade II listing in 1998 within the Register of Historic Parks and Gardens.

Virgin ceased its operation of the Roof Gardens in January 2018 and the site was closed to the public. Stephen Fitzpatrick, founder of OVO Energy and Vertical Aerospace, acquired the site in 2021 and planned to re-open The Roof Gardens as a three-storey social club in 2024.

The Roof Gardens reopened in 2024 as an exclusive private member's club.

== The gardens ==
It is divided into three themed gardens:

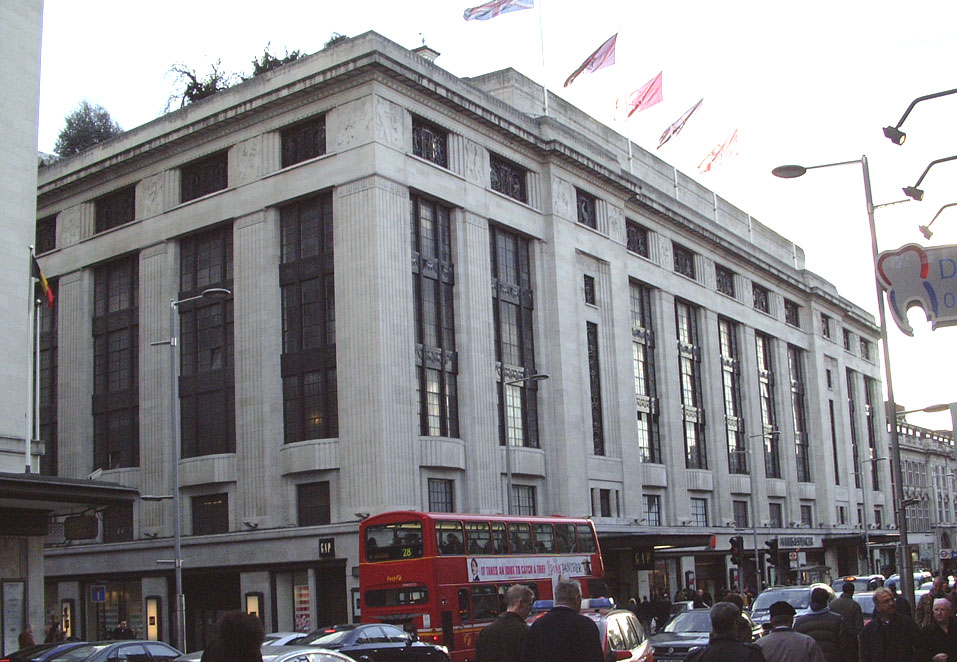
The Kensington Roof Gardens are barely visible from Kensington High Street.

- a Spanish garden, in a Moorish style based upon the Alhambra in Spain, with fountains, vine-covered walkways and Chusan palms;
- a Tudor style garden, characterised by its archways, secret corners and hanging wisteria. Roses, lilies and lavender contribute the rich summer scent to the garden;
- an English water garden, with over 100 species of trees, a stream, and a garden pond that is the home to pintail ducks and four flamingos called Bill, Ben, Splosh and Pecks. There are over 30 different species of trees in the water garden, including trees from the original planting over sixty years ago. The roof was designed to bear the load of one hundredweight per square foot (approximately 500 kilogrammes per square metre) with a drainage layer of brick and clinker beneath the soil. Although they are on a rooftop, the trees were made the subject of tree preservation orders in 1976.

== Gallery ==
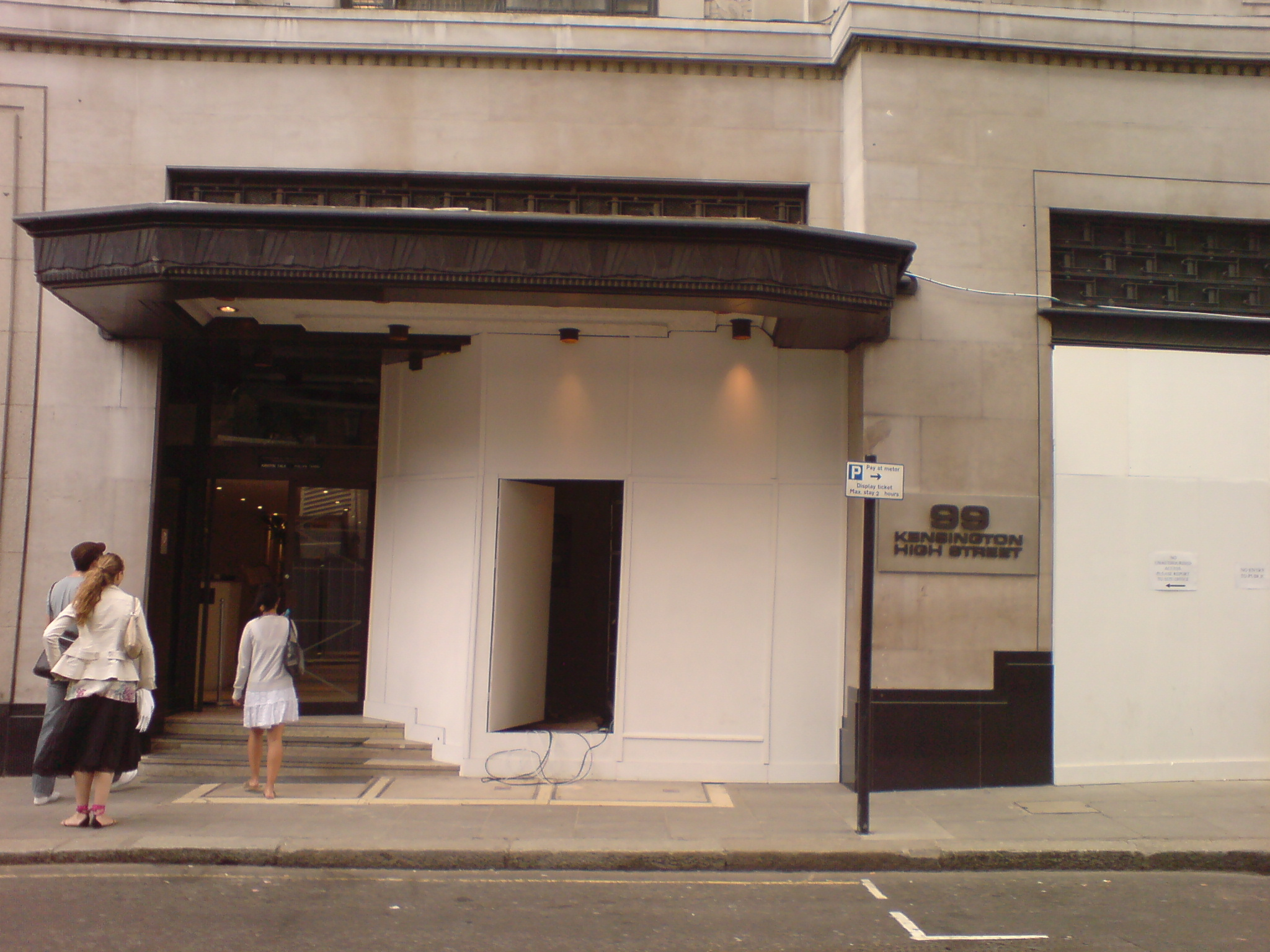
99 Kensington High Street entrance on Derry Street. The street-level entrance to the roof gardens

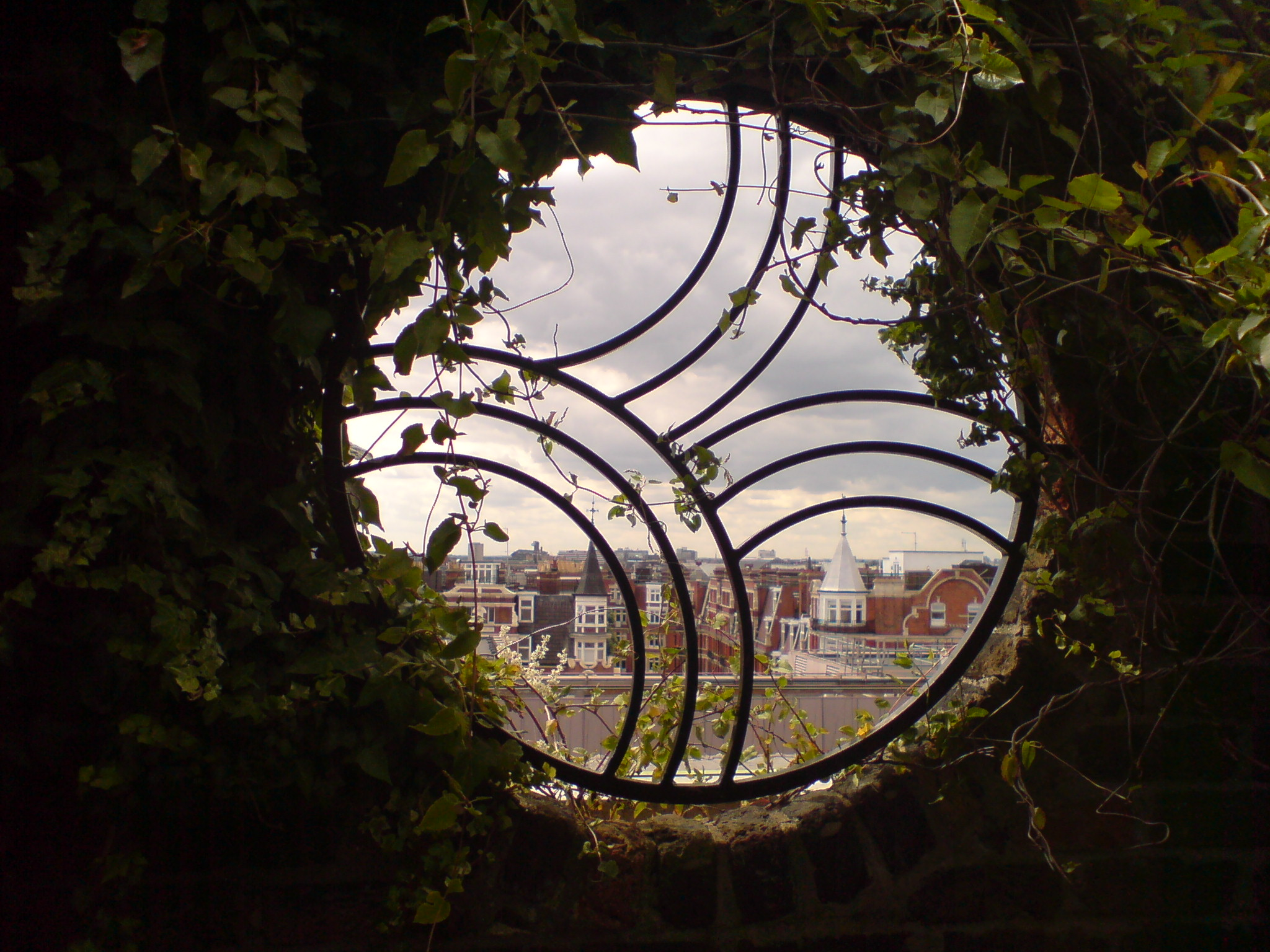
One of the windows in the walled garden

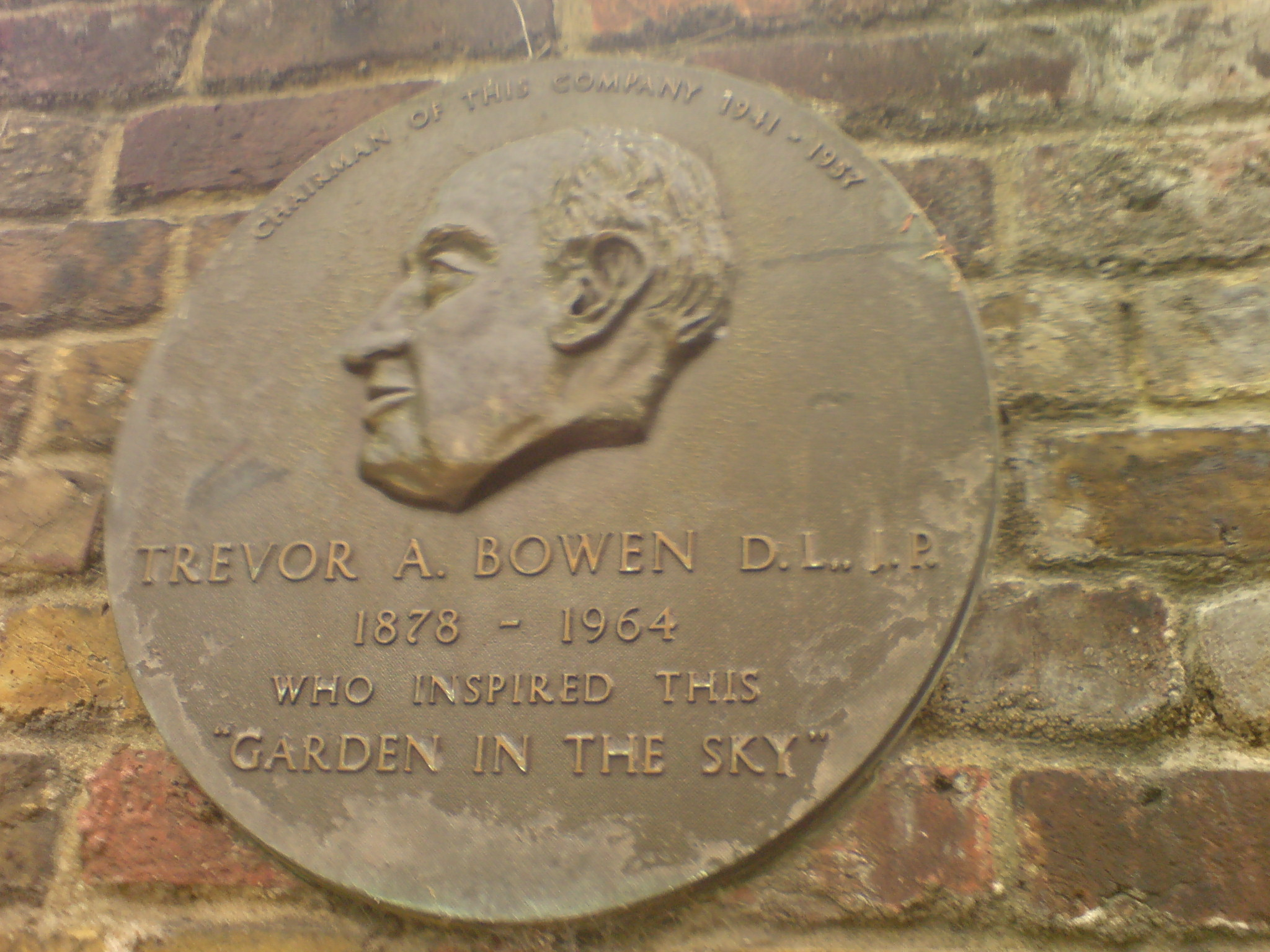
Plaque in the garden showing Trevor Bowen, director of Barkers of Kensington

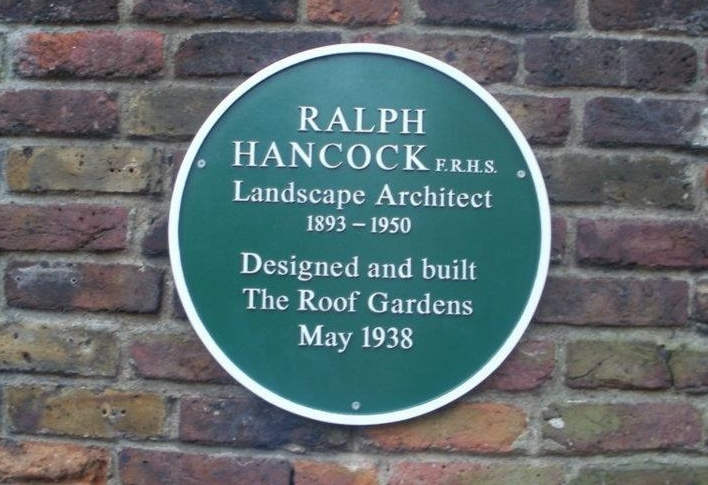
Ralph Hancock Commemorative Plaque, unveiled by members of the Hancock family on 29 January 2012

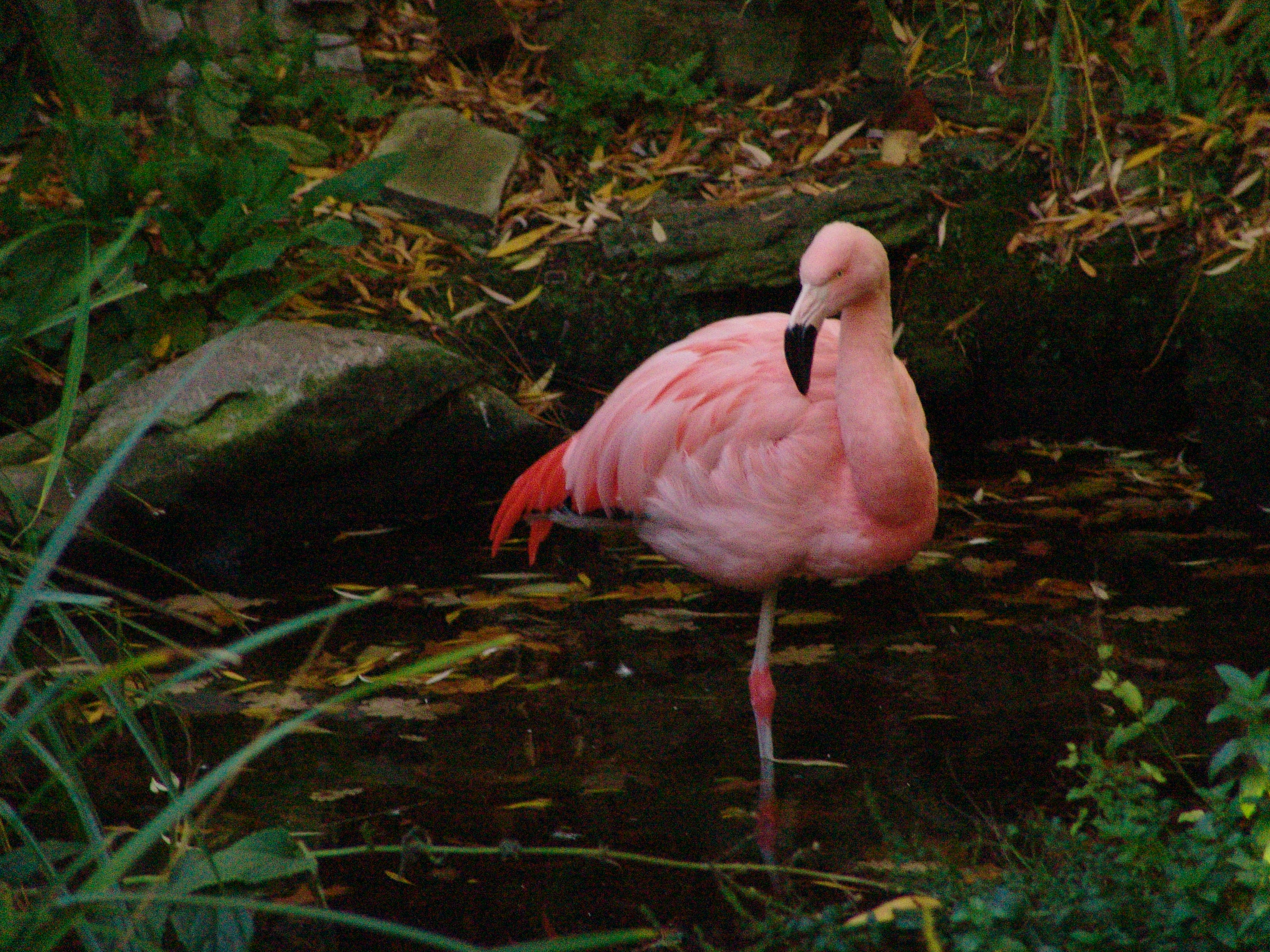
One of the pink flamingos that live in the gardens

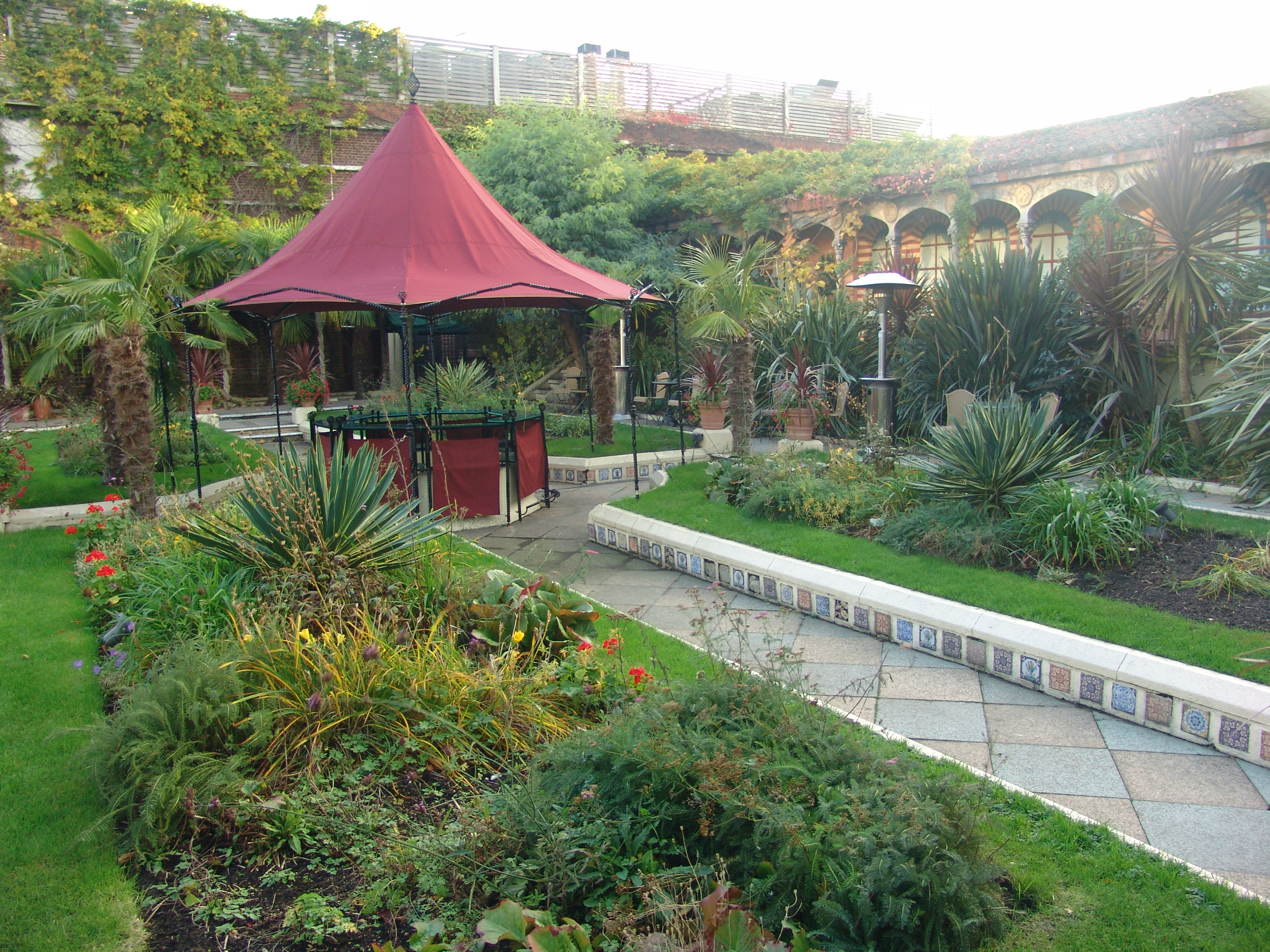
A tent in the Spanish garden
