= Bernard George =

Bernard George (1894-1964) was an architect and member of the Royal Institute of British Architects.

Bernard George between 1928 and 1962 worked as the chief architect for the inhouse design team at Barkers of Kensington.

His main commissions were for his employers, with the design of both Barkers of Kensington and Derry & Toms stores in Kensington High Street, Kensington, London in the art deco style. Both the Derry and Tom building and the Roof garden built on top of the store are listed. Additional work completed by George includes 65 Streatham High Road.

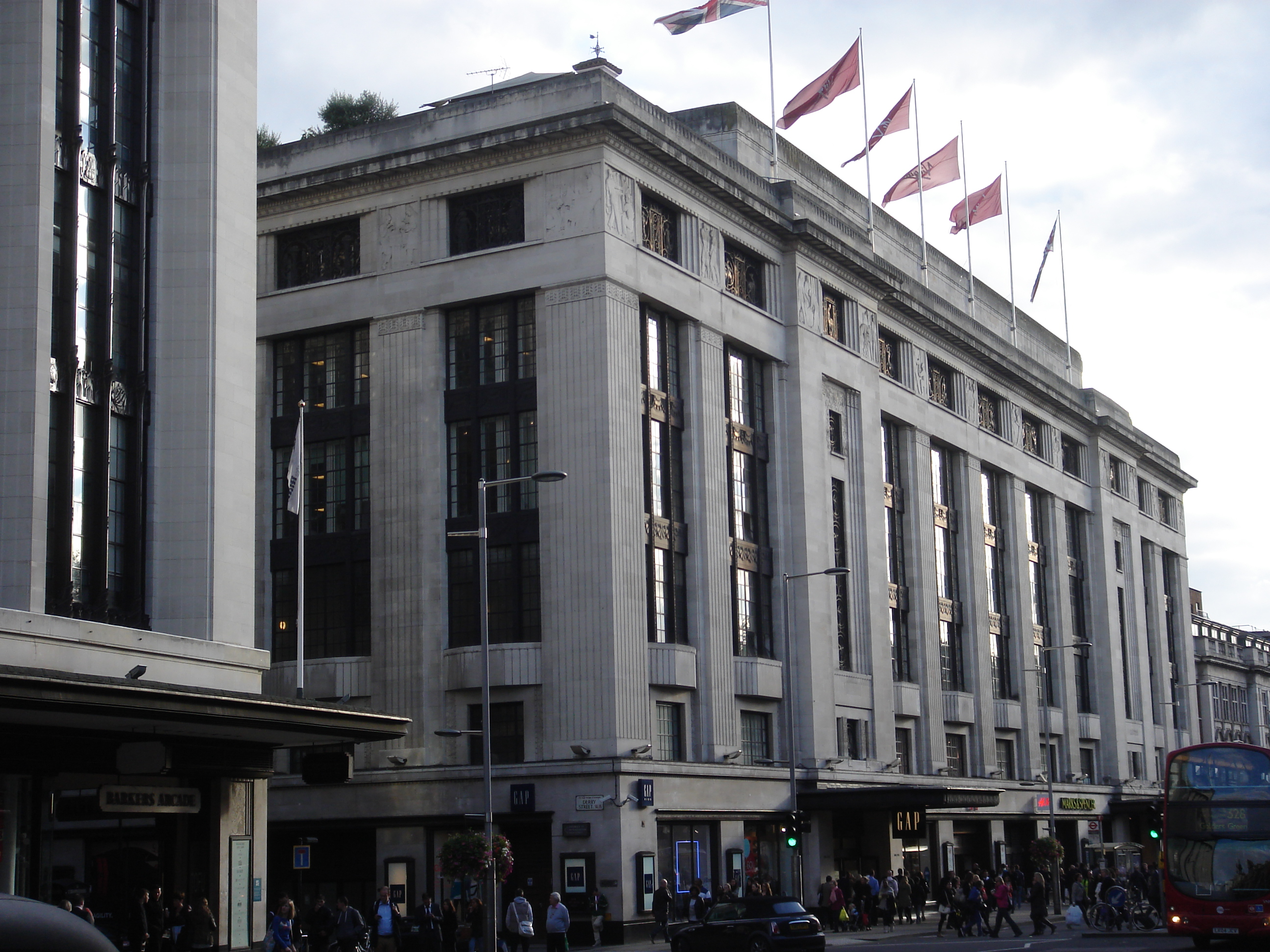
Derry and Toms Store today

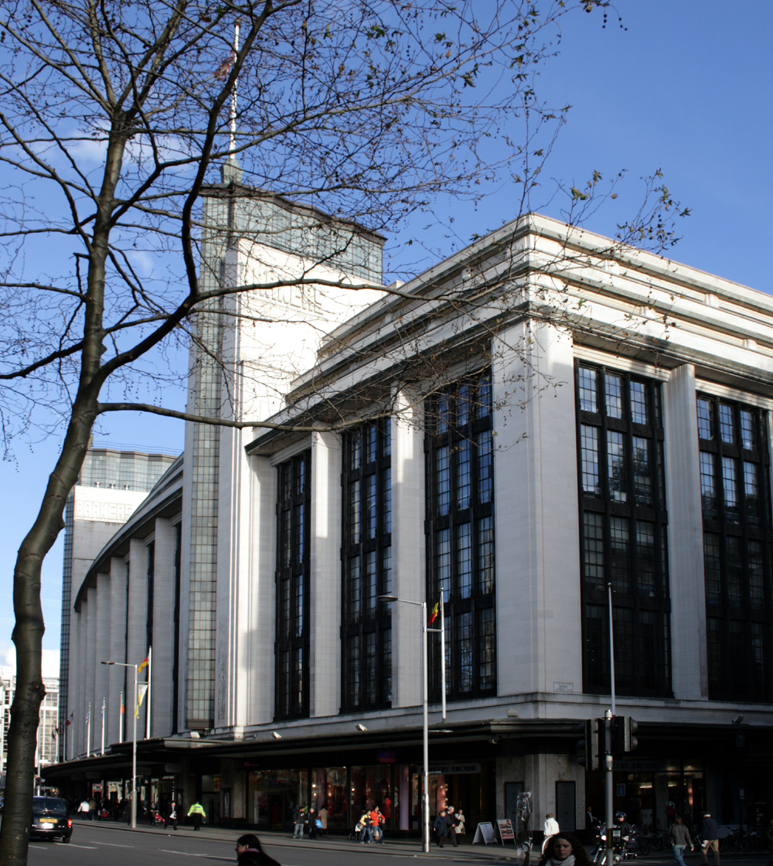
Barkers store today

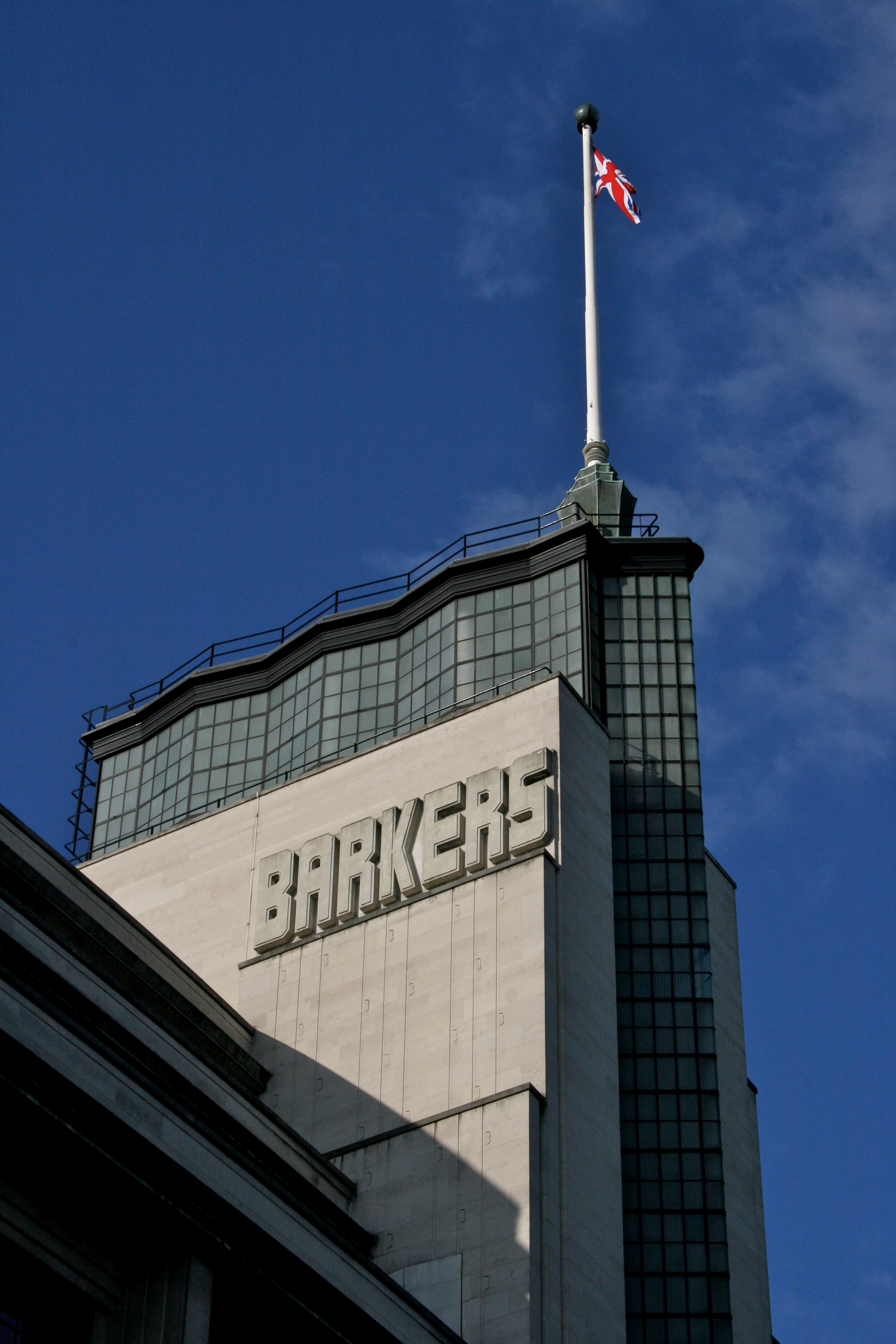
Close up of Barker Tower
