= Ralph Hancock (landscape gardener) =

British landscape gardener (1893–1950)

Ralph Hancock F.R.H.S.
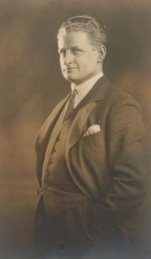
- Ralph Hancock FRHS (circa 1936)
- Born: 2 July 1893; Cardiff, Wales
- Died: 30 August 1950 (aged 57); London, England
- Occupation: landscape gardener

Ralph Hancock (2 July 1893 – 30 August 1950) was a Welsh landscape gardener, architect and author. Hancock built gardens in the United Kingdom in the 1920s, 1930s and 1940s and in the United States in the 1930s. He is known for the roof gardens at Derry and Toms in London and the Rockefeller Center in New York City, the garden at Twyn-yr-Hydd House in Margam, and the rock and water garden he built for Princess Victoria at Coppins, Iver, England.

== Early life ==
Clarence Henry Ralph Hancock was born at 20 Keppoch Street, Cardiff, Wales on 2 July 1893. His father Clarence Hancock worked for a company known as Evans and Hancock who were Auctioneers and Estate Agents based at Borough Chambers, Wharton Street, Cardiff. In 1917 Ralph married Hilda Muriel Ellis (known as Muriel) and moved to Augusta Road, Penarth.

Their first son, Clarence Neville Bramley Hancock (Bramley), was born in 1918 and their second son, Denys, also born in Penarth in 1920. At this time Hancock's occupation was a Marine and General Insurance Broker working from James Street, Cardiff. However, in 1926 he had changed career, becoming a Fellow of the Royal Horticultural Society. He had been known to have an interest in horticulture, particularly orchids.

Hancock and his family moved to Downside Road, Sutton, Surrey, England and in 1928 a daughter, Sheila Muriel was born. It was from here in 1927 that Hancock undertook the first of his more famous garden projects, designing and constructing a rock and water garden for H.R.H. Princess Victoria at her home "Coppins" in Iver, Buckinghamshire. Hancock was reported to be extremely proud of the garden and HRH presented to him "a little diamond and sapphire tie pin" one of his most treasured possessions. The main influences of this period was William Robinson and Gertrude Jekyll and Ralph incorporated this Arts and Crafts movement into his designs.

== America and The Rock ==
On 31 May 1930, Hancock went to New York City. To promote his work in the U.S., he published an illustrated booklet titled English Gardens in America in which he described himself as being "Landscape Gardener to HRH the Princess Victoria of England". The promotional booklet must have worked as Hancock went on to design an exhibition garden at Erie Station in New Jersey. He also staged exhibits at the Massachusetts Horticulture Show where he won several awards, including in 1933 the Presidents Cup. He was also one of the designers of the Lydia Duff Gray Hubbard garden in New Jersey which now forms part of the Garden Club of America Collection. But it was between 1933 and 1935 that Ralph was to embark on one of his most ambitious projects, the construction of spectacular gardens at the Rockefeller Center in New York.

For almost 90 years, formal gardens have bloomed on the roofs of the British Empire Building and Maison Française. Hancock's "Gardens of the Nations" emulated the cultural styles of gardens from Holland, France, Italy, and England, where each garden had its very own hostess dressed in themed costume. 3,000 tons of earth, 500 tons of bricks, 20,000 bulbs, 100 tons of natural stone, 2,000 trees and shrubs were delivered by the service elevator or man hauled using a block and tackle up the side of the eleven floors of the building. The garden also required 96,000 gallons of water which was lifted by an electric pump.

Hancock was confident that what he had created would allow numerous opportunities for other similar gardens in the US. He declared that "the day of penthouse gardening are over and miles and miles of roof space in every metropolis in this country remain to be reclaimed by landscape gardening". Throughout the project Ralph was in regular correspondence with both John D Rockefeller and Nelson Rockefeller.

As well as designing and building the gardens Hancock also ran the "Sky Garden Tour". Visitors were charged a dollar a time. The enterprise did not prove to be profitable and lost approximately $45,000 per year. By 1938 the attraction had closed.

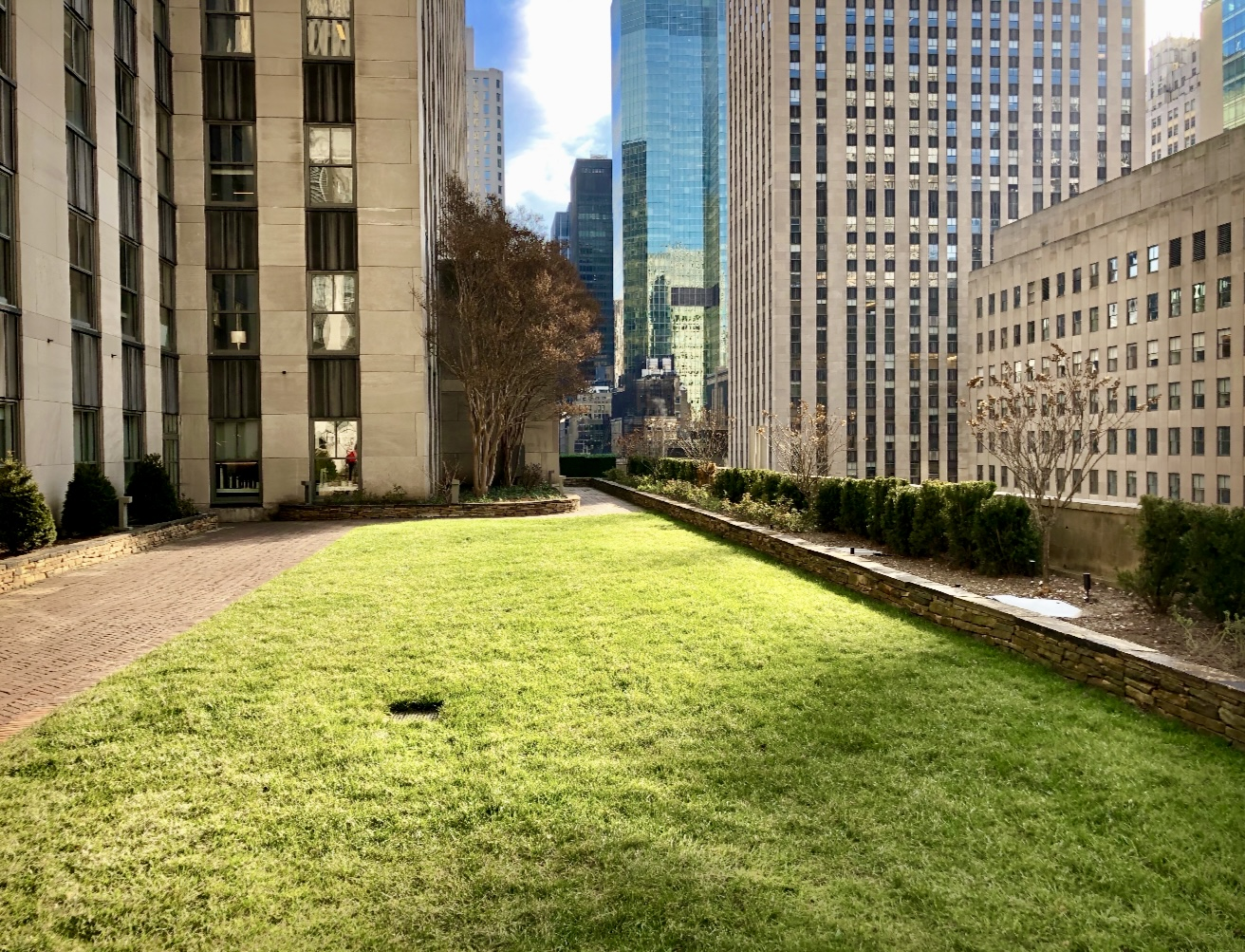

== The roof gardens at Derry and Toms ==
The gardens at the Rockefeller were visited by Trevor Bowen, the managing director of Barkers of Kensington, which had taken over Derry & Toms, a department store in Kensington, London. Bowen liked what he saw and employed Hancock to create a similar effect in the heart of London.

This time Hancock was to build three gardens, each with its own style and planting. The gardens were; a Tudor garden with herringbone brickwork, Tudor arches and wrought iron. The Spanish garden complete with palm trees and fountains as well as Moorish colonnades. And a woodland garden, built with a cascade, a river and its own pink flamingoes.

Once again the logistics involved in the construction were impressive. Before planting and building could start a thick bitumastic base was laid on the roof, followed by a layer of loose brick and rubble that was arranged in a fan-like pattern to aid drainage. On top of this was a 36-inch layer of topsoil into which the planting was made. Water came from Derry and Toms own artesian wells. On opening day the gardens contained over 500 different varieties of trees and shrubs.

The gardens were completed in 1938 at a cost of £25,000 and were officially opened by the Earl of Athlone in May of that year. Visitors were charged a shilling (5p) to tour the gardens and over the next 30 years over £120,000 was raised for local hospitals.

Today, the three gardens largely look as they did in the late 1930s. Since 1998, the roof garden has been on English Heritage's (now Historic England's) Register of Parks and Gardens at Grade II. Many of the original trees, now covered by preservation orders, remain.

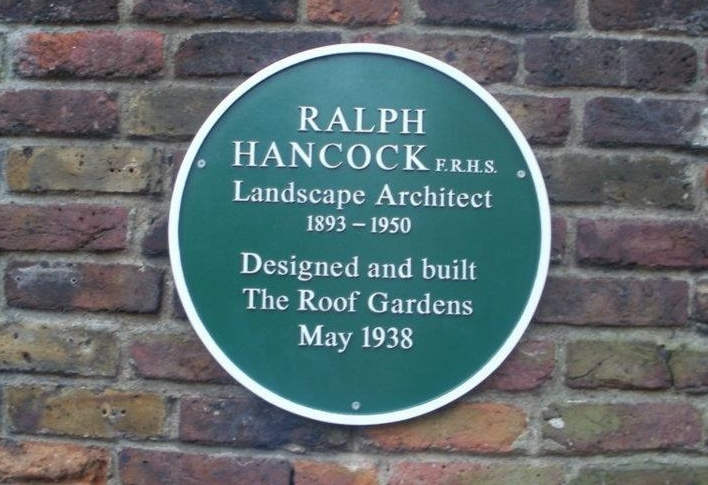
Ralph Hancock Commemorative Plaque, unveiled by members of the Hancock family on 29 January 2012

== Family, the Chelsea Flower Show and World War II ==
By 1936 the Hancock family were living at 110 Sloane Street in Kensington, and owned a country house at Horne, Lingfield, Surrey. Ralph had purchased and restored the country house, which was a derelict farmhouse constructed in the 16th century. He also designed and built one of his trademark gardens using many of the features that have become familiar, such as a herringbone brickwork path.

Ralph and his young family took to the country life. Ralph decided to keep pigs and, although he employed someone to look after them, he even purchased a pig keeper's white coat, much to the amusement of the family. The family house at Horne was sold by Ralph in 1941.

Ralph continued to be a very successful exhibitor at the Chelsea Flower Show, winning gold medals in 1936, 1937 and 1938. The gardens constructed at Chelsea had moved away from the naturalistic rock garden style towards the arts and crafts style that is now more associated with his later work. One of Ralph's specialties became the use of Moon Gates, which he used both at Chelsea and a number of other garden projects. His 1938 Chelsea garden was particularly popular. A review in Amateur Gardening said, "Mr Ralph Hancock had one of the most ambitious schemes in the garden avenue; a model of an old mill cottage, complete with millstream and sunken garden, the whole construction being carried out in a most realistic manner. It was a centre of attraction throughout the show."

As well as designing gardens, Hancock also wrote a book titled When I Make a Garden, which was reprinted in 1950 and updated to include images of the Derry and Toms roof gardens as well as later work. He also exhibited gardens at the Ideal Home Exhibition in 1936, 1937 and 1938. Each of the Ideal Homes gardens was required to conform to a theme. In 1936 the theme was Gardens and Music. The garden featured 1,200 plants that were brought over from the USA. The 1937 theme was Gardens of the Lovers.

The theme for the 1938 show was Novelists and their Gardens for which the designers had to take as inspiration their favourite living author. Ralph chose as his inspiration Rafael Sabatini. Sabatini was famous for his tales of high adventure such as Scaramouche, Captain Blood and The Sea Hawk, all of which became successful motion pictures. Captain Blood was produced in 1935 and gave a young Errol Flynn his first ever Hollywood starring role.

The show catalogue for that year hints at some form of collaboration between the author and the architect. Although of Italian birth Sabatini was living in Hereford. Ralph's garden tribute to Sabatini featured a half-timbered cottage and also his trademark herringbone brickwork. The planting consisted of rhododendrons, heathers and aquatic plants near a winding brook. In 1939 Ralph won a silver cup at Chelsea for a Formal Mediterranean Garden.

Gardens and landscapes were put on hold with the advent of the Second World War. Ralph, Denys and Bramley all joined the military, while Muriel drove ambulances.

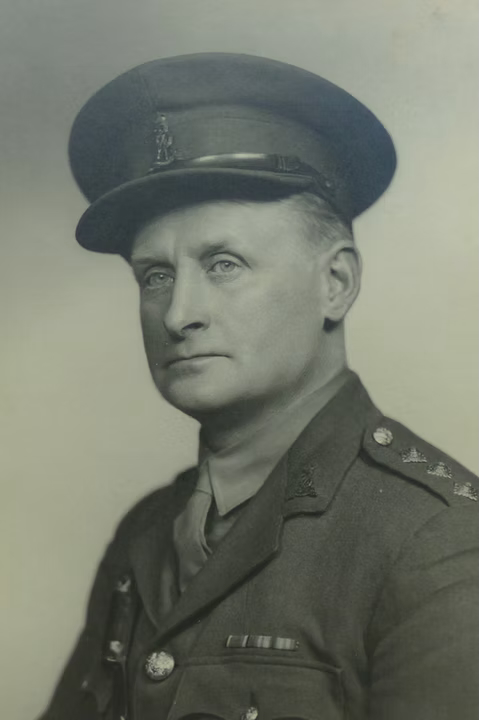

Ralph, who had previously served in the First World War, was re-activated. Second Lieutenant Denys Hancock joined the Royal Tank Regiment, and Captain Bramley Hancock served as an artillery forward observation officer. Sheila, who was 11 when war was declared, was sent to the neutral U.S. to stay with friends. Denys Hancock would later die in November 1941 during Operation Crusader in North Africa.

Back in England, Derry and Toms was damaged during an air raid. However, after the war ended it was repaired. Although the garden was restored to its pre-war splendour, neither Ralph nor Muriel fully recovered after the death of their youngest son, Denys.

== The latter years ==
After World War II, Hancock began to work with his son, Bramley. Together they constructed hundreds of private gardens throughout the United Kingdom. Ralph Hancock also submitted elaborate plans to several City Councils, including Gardens for Cardiff, Hull and Peace Gardens at Temple Newsam in Leeds. None of the plans were ever taken up.

Nineteen forty-seven saw the Chelsea Flower Show restart. Hancock returned with a rock garden and a formal garden, he also had an exhibit in the garden designers section.

It was at one of these post-war Chelsea shows that Sir David Evans Bevans, a Director at Barclays Bank commissioned Ralph and Bramley to build the gardens at Twyn-yr-Hydd.

Hancock had also purchased a little cottage at Chailey Green, near Lewes, Sussex. He had planned to restore the cottage and had drawn up plans to do so. Ralph died before work started and it was left to Bramley to complete the restoration.

A garden for Earl Peel at his home "The Hyning", located in Lancashire was the last designed by Hancock before his death of a heart attack on 30 August 1950. It was completed after his father's passing by his son Bramley.

== Books by this author ==
- When I Make a Garden, 1935, Reprinted 1950.

== See also ==
- Kensington Roof Gardens

== Sources ==
- Information about Ralph Hancock is taken from various sources including; Welsh Living, Spring 2007 edition. Western Mail, 17 April 2007 (Author: Bob Priddle). BBC Radio Wales – Jamie Owen Show, 30 April 2007; Derry and Toms 1828 – present (Information sheet by Becky Burns, Head Gardener, The Roof Gardens, Kensington). When I Make a Garden (Ralph Hancock FRHS) 1936 and 1950. As well as original research undertaken by the students of Neath and Port Talbot College Horticulture Department, Garden History Course 2006–2007 and from the collective memories of the Hancock family.
