= Vertical Aerospace =

British aerospace manufacturer (est. 2016)

Vertical Aerospace Ltd.
- Vertical logo
- Type: Public
- Traded as: NYSE: EVTL
- Industry: Aerospace, Advanced Air Mobility
- Founded: 2016; 10 years ago
- Founder: Stephen Fitzpatrick
- Headquarters: Bristol, England, UK
- Products: eVTOL aircraft
- Number of employees: 330 (2022)
- Website: www.vertical-aerospace.com

Vertical Aerospace Ltd. is an aerospace manufacturer based in Bristol, England. It designs and builds zero emission, electric vertical take-off and landing (eVTOL) electrically powered aircraft.

== History ==
=== 2010s ===
The company was founded in 2016 by Stephen Fitzpatrick, an ex-Formula One team owner, and founder and CEO of OVO Energy.

In June 2018, the company flew its first prototype aircraft — an electrically powered quadcopter that weighed 750 kg (1,650 lb), named VA-X1 — at Cotswold Airport, Kemble, Gloucestershire. The aircraft, which was unmanned and remotely controlled, was capable of vertical take-off and landing (VTOL) and had four electric engines, each inside a ducted fan.

In 2019, the company became Honeywell's first eVTOL customer, buying their fly-by-wire aircraft control systems for a future Vertical Aerospace aircraft, the VA-X4. Further in 2019 they launched their second aircraft, VA-X2, making them the first company in the world to release flight footage of an electric VTOL aircraft capable of carrying 250 kg (550 lb). 2019 was also the year the company appointed its president, Michael Cervenka, former Head of Future Business Propositions at Rolls-Royce.

=== 2020s ===
In April 2020, Tim Williams joined Vertical Aerospace. Later in 2020, the company announced the VX4, a significant departure from the company's previous multicopter design. They also established Vertical Advanced Engineering, in order to apply technologies and agile processes from F1 to the development of eVTOL aircraft.

In January 2021, Vertical Aerospace joined a consortium of urban air mobility and aviation companies to work with the UK's Civil Aviation Authority as part of its Future Air Mobility Regulatory Sandbox. The company announced that they would be partnering companies like Skyports Limited, Atkins, a member of the SNC-Lavalin Group, and the West of England Combined Authority.

Also in February 2021, the company announced it was partnering with Solvay S.A. for the development of the composite structure of its vehicle. In March, the company announced it was partnering with Rolls-Royce for the development of its electrical power system.

In May 2021, former Airbus CEO Urban Mobility, Eduardo Dominguez Puerta joined Vertical Aerospace as Chief Commercial Officer. In June 2021, it was announced that the company would merge with Broadstone Acquisition Corp, a special-purpose acquisition company (SPAC), founded by Hugh Osmond. Additionally, the company announced that it would float on the NYSE.

In June 2021, the company was exploring a flying taxi service as part of a partnership with Virgin Atlantic. The company had originally stated a goal of commercial flight by 2022. In its most recent announcements, it appears to be targeting 2024. Also, in June, American Airlines announced a pre-order of up to 250 aircraft with an option for an additional 100.

In December 2021, following the SPAC merger with Broadstone Acquisition Corp., the company was listed on the New York Stock Exchange (NYSE) under the ticker EVTL.

In January, the company appointed Avolon's Dómhnal Slattery as Vertical Chairman. In the period between 2020 and 2022, under the leadership of Chief Engineer, Tim Williams, Vertical Aerospace successfully designed, built, and flew the VX-4 prototype aircraft. This achievement marked a historic moment in the aerospace industry, as it was the first of its kind – a new technology, electric-powered aircraft – to be created in the United Kingdom in living memory. The aircraft accomplished its first takeoff and landing while tethered to the ground in September.

In 2023, the VX4 successfully completed an unmanned test flight at Kemble Airport, Cotswold UK. The aircraft demonstrated its capabilities by lifting off, hovering, flying, and landing solely through the thrust generated by Vertical's proprietary battery packs. The prototype was damaged during uncrewed flight testing on 9 August 2023 at Cotswold Airport. The company attributed the accident to a fault with the propeller, but said it was an older design that had since been replaced.

In 2024 the second full-scale prototype of the VX4 was revealed. It was claimed to use a proprietary battery and a powertrain system with 20% greater power. The prototype also included redesigned carbon fiber propellers to lower noise and improve performance.

In January 2025, piloted hover flight tests were successfully carried out. The next testing stage is low-speed manoeuvres.

In April 2026, the craft completed a piloted transition between helicopter mode and airplane mode in continuous flight.

In July 2026, Vertical Aerospace conducted the first public demonstration of its VX4 prototype transitioning from wing-borne flight to a vertical landing at the Farnborough International Airshow. The UK government also announced a further £10 million grant for the company, bringing its total state funding to £48 million.

== VX4 ==
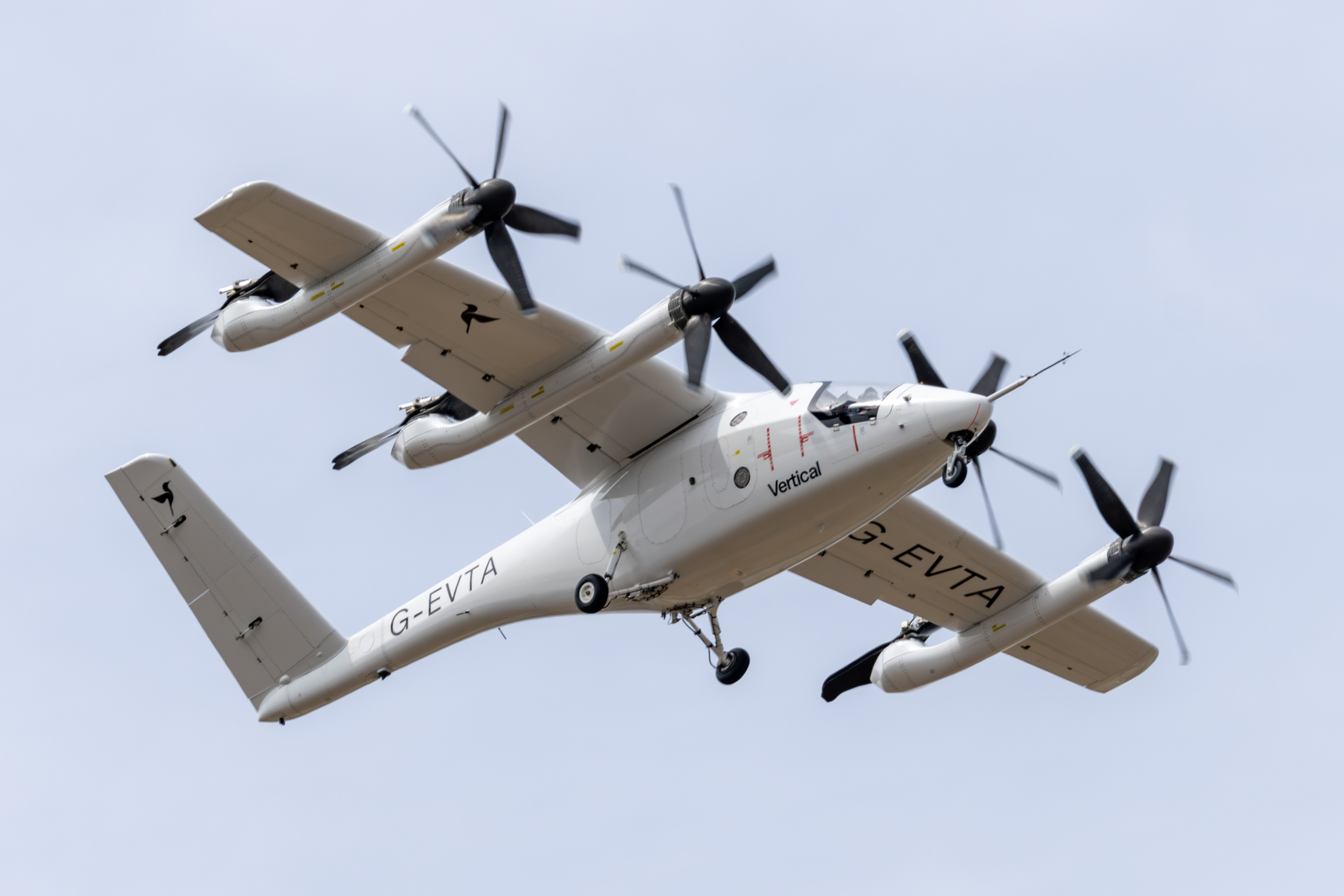
Vertical Aerospace VX4 at the 2026 Farnborough International Airshow

Vertical Aerospace says that the VX4 is a piloted, zero emissions electric vertical take off and landing (eVTOL) vehicle with an expected range of over 100 miles (160.9 km), capacity for 4 passengers and a pilot, and runs quieter than a helicopter. The proposed aircraft is intended to operate in and out of cities and other confined locations.

It would rely on its fixed wing for lift during most of a flight. This shift follows the eVTOL industry, which is shifting towards wing-borne lift + cruise and vectored thrust concepts, due to the efficiency gains wing-borne lift offers while cruising.

It features eight propellers mounted to the wing. The four front-mounted propellers shift from providing lift in take-off mode to providing forward thrust while cruising. The rear motors operate only during take-off and landing.

== Partners and investors ==
In June 2021, the company teamed up with American Airlines, Avolon, Rolls-Royce, Honeywell and Microsoft's M12 as partners and investors. The partners and investors had expected a path to certification in 2024, de-risk execution, allow for a lean cost structure, and production at scale. Other partners include GKN Aerospace and Solvay.

In 2024, the company secured a $50 million investment from US distressed debt investor Mudrick Capital, consequently with a 70% shareholding, financing continued testing until the end of 2025. First commercial flights could take place in 2028.

The company's partnership with American Airlines, Avolon, and Virgin Atlantic will see forward sales under pre-orders for up to 1,000 aircraft. In March 2025, Virgin Atlantic also came to an agreement with US eVTOL competitor Joby Aviation.
