= Japan House London =

Cultural institution in London

Coordinates: 51°30′05″N 0°11′30″W

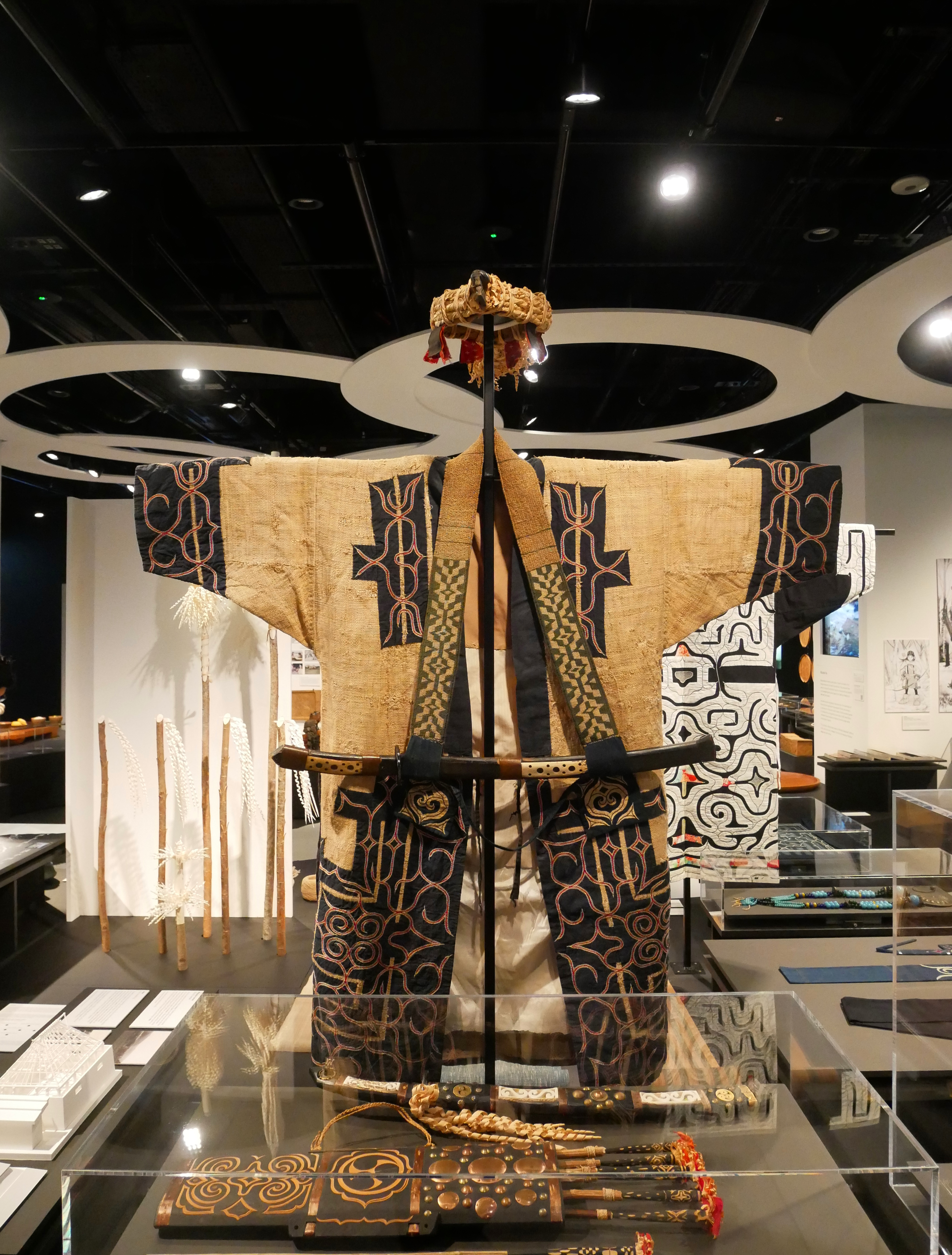
Attus Amip displayed at Japan House London

Japan House London is a Japanese cultural center on Kensington High Street in London, United Kingdom. It is includes workshops, exhibitions, a restaurant, and retail. It is part of an initiative by Japan's Ministry of Foreign Affairs, and the third "Japan House" opened after Japan House Los Angeles and Japan House Sao Paulo.

The Japan House program was planned from 2014 and budgeted at US$35 million. Japan House London opened in June 2018, and has featured multiple Japanese artists. The opening exhibition was by architect Sou Fujimoto. A 2023 to 2024 exhibit presented modern Ainu culture near the Saru River. A 2024 exhibit focused on Japanese design, holding a conversation with the chief curator of the Design Museum, also on Kensington High Street.

The Japan House program faced initial criticism as "propaganda houses", a method for Japan to advance historical revisionism and its views on territorial disputes via soft power. Tomomi Yamaguchi, writing in The Asia-Pacific Journal: Japan Focus, argued the project was intended to counter efforts by China and South Korea. Yamaguchi wrote that the government had initially planned to run exhibits on "historical controversies" relating to Japanese war crimes, as well as the Senkaku Islands dispute with China and the Liancourt Rocks dispute with South Korea. Warren A. Stanislaus, writing in The Diplomat magazine, interpreted the 2016 Diplomatic Bluebook of Japan’s reference to "communicating a correct understanding of Japan" as advancing historical positions and territorial disputes, and argued censorship of these topics would not be in Japan's interest. Stanislaus compared the program to Davos, targeting a more influential audience, in response to a perceived failure of the Cool Japan strategy to capitalize on soft power.
