= Mudrick =

Mudrick is a surname. Notable people with the surname include:

- Jason Mudrick (born 1975), American hedge fund manager; founder, president, and chief investment officer of Mudrick Capital Management
- Marvin Mudrick (1921–1986), American literary critic
