= Derry & Toms =

1860–1973 department store in London

Coordinates: 51.5012°N 0.1921°W

- Company type: Private/ceased trading 1971
- Industry: Retail
- Genre: Department store
- Founded: 1860; 166 years ago
- Founder: Joseph Toms, Charles Derry
- Defunct: 1973; 53 years ago
- Headquarters: Kensington High Street, London, England

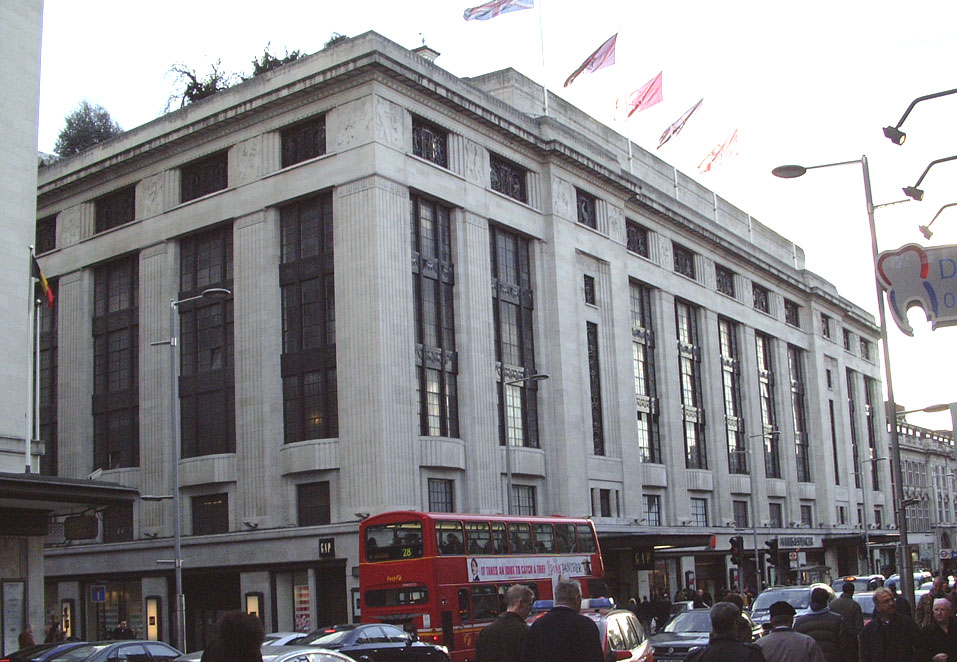
The former Derry & Toms building in 2006

Derry & Toms was a London department store that was founded in 1860 in Kensington High Street and was famous for its Roof Garden which opened in 1938. In 1973 the store was closed and became home to Big Biba, which closed in 1975. The site was developed into smaller stores and offices.

== Origins ==
In 1853 Joseph Toms opened a small drapery shop on Kensington High Street. In 1862 Joseph Toms joined forces with his brother-in-law, Charles Derry, to set up Derry & Toms. By 1870 the business had grown to incorporate seven of the surrounding stores, with one of the buildings being used as a mourning department. The company prided itself as being the supplier of goods to the upper class of Kensington.

== History ==
In 1920 John Barker & Co., the department store next door, acquired Derry & Toms. The firm already owned Pontings, which was adjacent to Derry & Toms on the other side. In 1919 Derry & Toms employed the services of poster artist F Gregory Brown to produce advertising. His advert The Daintiest of Legwear at Derry & Toms sold for £6,240 at Bonhams in 2007.

In 1930, building work was started and the new, seven-storey building on Kensington High Street opened in 1933. The building was designed by Bernard George in an Art Deco style popular at the time, and featured metalwork by Walter Gilbert and panel reliefs, entitled Labour & Technology, by Charles Henry Mabey Jr. The building is most famous for its Roof Gardens, which opened in 1938 and still exist today. The garden was designed by landscape architect Ralph Hancock after the managing director of Barkers, Trevor Bowen, visited Rockefeller Center in New York.

The main restaurant, situated on the fifth floor, was called The Rainbow Room and became a venue for thousands of "Dinner & Dances" (banquets), for both private firms and government departments. In 1957 John Barker & Co was bought by House of Fraser, bringing Derry & Toms under their stewardship.

The store was sold in 1971 to Biba. Derry & Toms continued to operate until 1973, when it finally closed. It was replaced in 1974 by Big Biba, which itself closed in 1975. Developer British Land developed the site into offices and shops. The location is now used by Marks & Spencer, H&M, Japan House London, and Gap, and as offices for Sony Music UK and Warner Music Group. In 2012, the American luxury fitness chain Equinox opened its first UK location on the fifth floor. Since 1978 the roof garden has been listed as Grade II, and since 1981 the building has been a Grade II* listed building.

The name of one of the founders of the former store is preserved in the adjacent Derry Street.
