= Pontings =

Former department store in London

Coordinates: 51°30′2.76″N 0°11′34.58″W

Pontings was a department store based in Kensington High Street, London and operated from 1863 to 1970.

== Early history ==
The first of four brothers to move from Gloucestershire and set up in the drapery business was Thomas Ponting who started a small drapery business in Archer Street, just off Westbourne Grove, trading as Thomas H Ponting & Co. By 1868, the business had moved to 123 Westbourne Grove.

Around 1873, Ponting Brothers, a milliner's, was opened at 125 Kensington High Street, by Thomas's younger brothers William Ponting, John Jones Ponting and Sydney Ponting. The profits made from this venture saw the business expand into 127 (1876) and 123 Kensington High Street (1890). This remained a separate business from brother Thomas's Westbourne Grove business. The business had changed from just a millinery and drapery to a seller of retail fancy goods and silks. In 1893 the premises grew again with the purchase of the adjacent Scarsdale House, the former mansion of the Curzons of Kedleston.

In 1898, the company was incorporated, with William Ponting listed as the biggest shareholder, followed by his brother John. However, William Ponting died shortly after, and the business was no longer directed by the family. The new company chairman was Henry Charles Richards, an MP. Between 1899 and 1901, Pontings replaced their old premises on Kensington High Street with a new building designed by Arthur Sykes, which was completed in two stages and cost them £14,000. The new building had a large basement and four storeys above, and was attached to Scarsdale House, which had not been touched. In the gardens of Scarsdale House were built four blocks (designed by architects E N Clifton & Son), which were used as offices and depositories.

== Twentieth century ==
Between 1906 and 1908, Kensington Railway Station was rebuilt, and as part of the development a new arcade was built to the designs of George Campbell Sherrin. The Ponting family also purchased many Kensington properties which were later used for rental income throughout the 20th century, netting the family a small fortune. Pontings also purchased the whole of the western side of the arcade before construction had started. However, the expansion of the business and the building programme had seen the company over-extend itself, and in December 1906, Pontings sadly went into liquidation. John Barker & Co., a fellow Kensington department store, purchased the business for £84,000 in April 1907.

Barkers did not neglect its new business, which continued to operate with its own buying team and to have its own distinctive image, labelling itself as the House of Value. The store expansion was completed on the western side of the arcade in 1908, while Scarsdale House was demolished and the Wright's Lane extension finished under the management of H L Cabuche, Barkers's own director of building during 1911–12.

After the First World War, John Barker & Co. expanded, buying the department store between the Barkers store and Pontings, Derry & Toms, in 1920, and also purchasing the freehold of the Pontings site for a total of £78,000. Barkers also added a cafe on Wright's Lane run by its catering subsidiary the Zeeta Company, and refurbished the store in 1923.

In 1957, Barkers was purchased by House of Fraser which in the 1960s decided to rationalize the businesses of Barkers. Barkers's Zeeta business and stores on the north side of Kensington High Street were closed before Pontings, the first of the department stores went, being closed down in 1970. The name, however, lived on, as the unsold stock from the closing down sale was transferred to Barker's own lower ground floor, and was called Pontings Bargain Basement, before it was renamed in 1974.

== After Pontings ==
The building became a market known as Kensington Super Store, before English Property Corporation redeveloped the site. The original building was pulled down and replaced by Pemberton House on Kensington High Street (1976–78) and Kensley House (1982–84) on Wright's Lane, both office blocks, while at the rear was built a block of flats called William Cobbett House.

The only remaining part of the Pontings store is the arcade section, which in 2011 hosted La Senza and Accessorize.
