= Stephen Fitzpatrick =

British businessman (born 1977)

- Born: 21 September 1977 (age 48); Belfast, Northern Ireland
- Education: University of Edinburgh
- Occupation: Businessman
- Title: Founder of OVO Energy and Vertical Aerospace

Stephen James Fitzpatrick (born 21 September 1977) is a Northern Irish businessman, founder of OVO Energy, Vertical Aerospace and former owner of the Manor Racing team.

== Early life and education ==
Fitzpatrick was born in Belfast. He studied at the Catholic Our Lady and St Patrick's College and the University of Edinburgh, where he received his master's degree in finance and business.

== Career ==
=== Early career ===
In 2001, after graduating, Fitzpatrick founded The Rental Guide, a real estate advertisement business which promoted properties in Scotland online and via a free newspaper. Livewire nominated him for the Young Entrepreneur of the Year. Fitzpatrick closed the business due to concerns about its ability to scale given limited numbers of real estate agents. He moved to London to take jobs in the financial sector with Societe Generale and JP Morgan.

=== OVO Energy ===
Fitzpatrick co-founded OVO Energy in 2009, as the culmination of a five-year plan during which he received a licence from Ofgem, the UK energy regulator, and along with his wife and co-founder Sophy saved the £350,000 needed to start the business. He acknowledged his inexperience with the energy market, and used the five years to study the industry; he credited the experience he gained with complex finances during those five years as critical to the company's survival. In 2014, Fitzpatrick won Entrepreneur of the Year at the National Business Awards. By July 2016, the company had 685,000 customers and employed over 1,000 in Bristol and London. In 2018, OVO Energy acquired one of its competitors, Spark Energy.

In 2020, OVO energy was fined £8.9 million for overcharging customers since 2015. In March 2021, OVO's practices were found to have caused detriment to 240,563 customers totaling over £2m, and the company was required to pay redress of over £2.8m – the highest amount of compensation among the 18 companies investigated. In 2022, OVO energy was ranked 2nd to the last (only behind Utila) in customer service by Citizens Advice. In September 2022, Fitzpatrick was called-out by Martin Lewis on Good Morning Britain as a 'Fat Cat making Profit' from its consumers in the midst of the cost of living crisis.

==== Use of company funds ====
In 2014, Fitzpatrick sold OVO stock to raise £2 million or 4.5% of the company to purchase his family home. The move drew criticism from The Guardian newspaper because in the previous year the company earned only £300,000 and had £9 million in liabilities.

=== Imagination Industries ===
Fitzpatrick is the sole owner of Imagination Industries Ltd, a holding company which has OVO Energy among its subsidiaries alongside many smaller companies in retail energy supply and related businesses such as electric car charging. Three of the energy supply subsidiaries operate in Australia, France and Germany. Another subsidiary, Vertical Aerospace Ltd, develops electrically powered VTOL aircraft.

=== Just3Things ===
In 2018, Fitzpatrick founded Just3Things with Kim Atherton, previously Chief People Officer at OVO. The remote working software aims to help organisations of all sizes to prioritise goals, align teams and break down silos.

=== Kensington Roof Gardens ===
Fitzpatrick now owns and operates a private members club and cinema in the historical Kensington Roof Gardens site above High Street Kensington Station.

== Formula One ==
Fitzpatrick, a self-described lifelong Formula One enthusiast, became owner of and a major investor in the Marussia F1 team in February 2015, taking over after the collapse of the team's previous parent company. Partnering with former Sainsbury's executive Justin King, who joined as interim chairman but did not directly invest in the team, Fitzpatrick contributed £30 million in personal funds to re-build the team – run by Graeme Lowdon and John Booth – after some of its assets had been auctioned off to repay debts.

The team competed in the 2015 season, ending in last position (10th) in the constructors' championship. Lowdon and Booth left at the end of the season. The team's name was changed to Manor Racing MRT for the 2016 season, finishing in last position (11th). The team collapsed in the early months of 2017, ending Fitzpatrick's involvement in Formula One team ownership.

== Personal life ==
In 2015, he lived in the Cotswolds with his wife Sophy and their three children. They have since separated and divorced. In 2021, the Sunday Times Rich List estimated his net worth at £675 million.
