= Jason Mudrick =

American hedge fund manager (born 1975)

- Born: February 23, 1975 (age 50)
- Education: University of Chicago (BA); Harvard University (JD)
- Occupation: Investment manager
- Known for: Founder and CIO of Mudrick Capital Management
- Children: 2

Jason Mudrick (born February 23, 1975) is an American investment manager who founded and became chief investment officer of Mudrick Capital Management, an investment firm focused on special situations such as distressed securities and deep value event driven investing.

Mudrick gained attention when his firm made $200 million in 2021, with the bulk of gains coming from debt and equity options for AMC Entertainment and out-of-the-money options for GameStop.

As of June 2022, Mudrick Capital managed $3.3 billion in assets.

== Early life and education ==
Mudrick was born on February 23, 1975. He graduated from the University of Chicago in 1997 with a Bachelor of Arts in political science and from Harvard Law School in 2000 with a Juris Doctor.

== Career ==
After graduating from Harvard Law School in 2000, he started his career as an investment banker in the Mergers & Acquisitions Investment Banking Division of Merrill Lynch & Co.

In 2001, he joined Contrarian Capital Management, as a managing director and portfolio manager for seven years. While at Contrarian, Mudrick managed the Contrarian Equity Fund, a fund specializing in distressed debt and post-bankruptcy equities. Mudrick grew that business to peak assets of approximately $400 million. He left Contrarian in 2008 and founded Mudrick Capital in 2009 with $5 million under management.

By 2016, Mudrick's eponymous firm was managing $1.3 billion and by 2019, $2.7 billion. It averaged 12.3 percent annualized returns in its first decade.

Mudrick Capital was one of the top performing hedge funds in 2019, with an annual gain of 28.8 percent, compared with the average hedge fund, which was up 11.4 percent. Much of the fund's success that year was the result of its 51 percent ownership interest in NJOY, which it had purchased in 2017, when the company was on the brink of bankruptcy. By 2017 the company's sales were up by over 1,100 percent year-on-year.

During the COVID-19 pandemic, Mudrick did not leave New York or close his offices, citing market opportunities; instead, he installed devices to measure employee temperatures and established protocols for keeping employees distanced.

Murdick launched two Special Purpose Acquisition Companies (SPAC) in 2020, launched in an attempt to take advantage of what was then seen as an opportunity to invest in struggling companies in the wake of the COVID-19-induced recession.

In 2021, Mudrick gained attention when his firm made $200 million in the month of January, with the bulk of gains coming from debt and equity options for AMC Entertainment Holdings, Inc. and out-of-the-money options for GameStop. Both companies’ stocks soared during a Reddit-fueled retail investor rally. On June 1, 2021, Mudrick entered into an agreement to purchase $230.5 million worth of shares from AMC Entertainment – 8.5 million of Class A common stock at $27.12 per share, only to dump its stake later in the day to cash in on the frenzy. Mudrick cited the stock as "massively overvalued."

Mudrick has served on multiple creditors' committees and served on the board of directors of numerous public and private companies, including Safety-Kleen Holdings, Integrated Alarm Services Group, Salton, Rotech Healthcare, NJOY Holdings, Corporate Risk Holdings, Mudrick Capital Acquisition Corporation, Fieldwood Energy, Proenza Schouler, cxLoyalty and Dex Media, where he is currently the chairman of the board.
