= Kensington High Street =

Main shopping street in Kensington, London

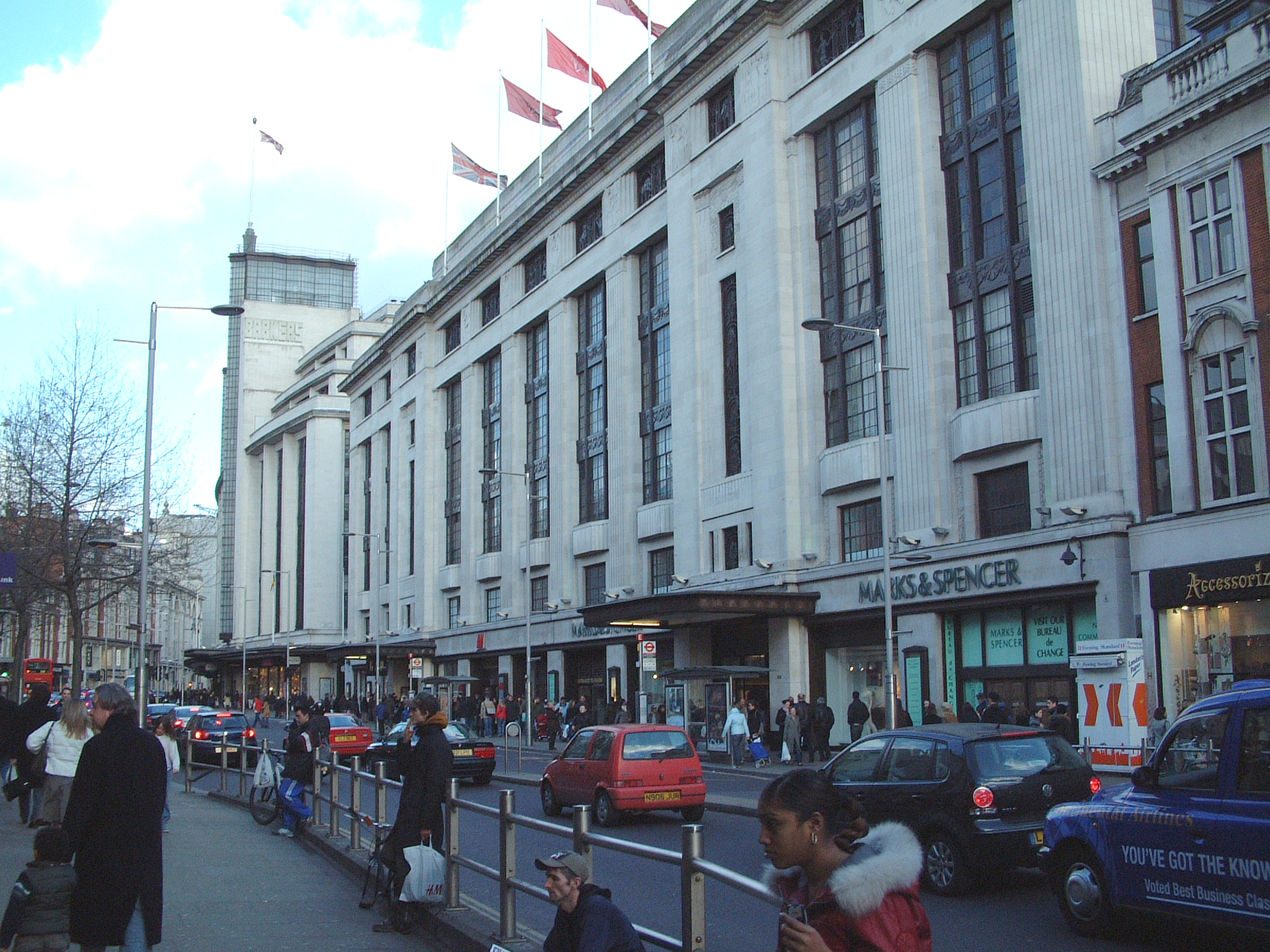
- The view east along Kensington High Street in March 2006, dominated by former department stores Derry & Toms and Barkers of Kensington
- Interactive map of Kensington High Street
- Location: Kensington, London, United Kingdom
- Postal code: W8
- Coordinates: 51°30′03″N 0°11′38″W
- West end: Hammersmith Road
- Major junctions: A3220, Addison Road, Melbury Road, Kensington Palace Gardens
- East end: Kensington Road
- North: Holland Park; Notting Hill Gate
- East: Kensington Gore
- South: Earls Court
- West: Hammersmith

Construction
- Commissioned: 1682
- Construction start: 1690s
- Completion: 1893

Other
- Known for: Shopping

Kensington High Street is the main shopping street in Kensington, London, England. The area is identified in the London Plan as one of 35 major centres in Greater London.

Kensington High Street is the continuation of Kensington Road and part of the A315. It starts by the entrance to Kensington Palace and runs westward through central Kensington. Near Kensington (Olympia) station, where the Royal Borough of Kensington and Chelsea ends and London Borough of Hammersmith and Fulham begins, it ends and becomes Hammersmith Road. The street is served by High Street Kensington underground station.

== History ==
In 1682, Francis Barry purchased land in Kensington and began to develop houses.

From the 1690s to 1893, Kensington High Street was developed around a residential terrace, with large houses occupied by a number of distinguished residents. The Terrace was located roughly between present-day Wrights Lane and Adam and Eve Mews.

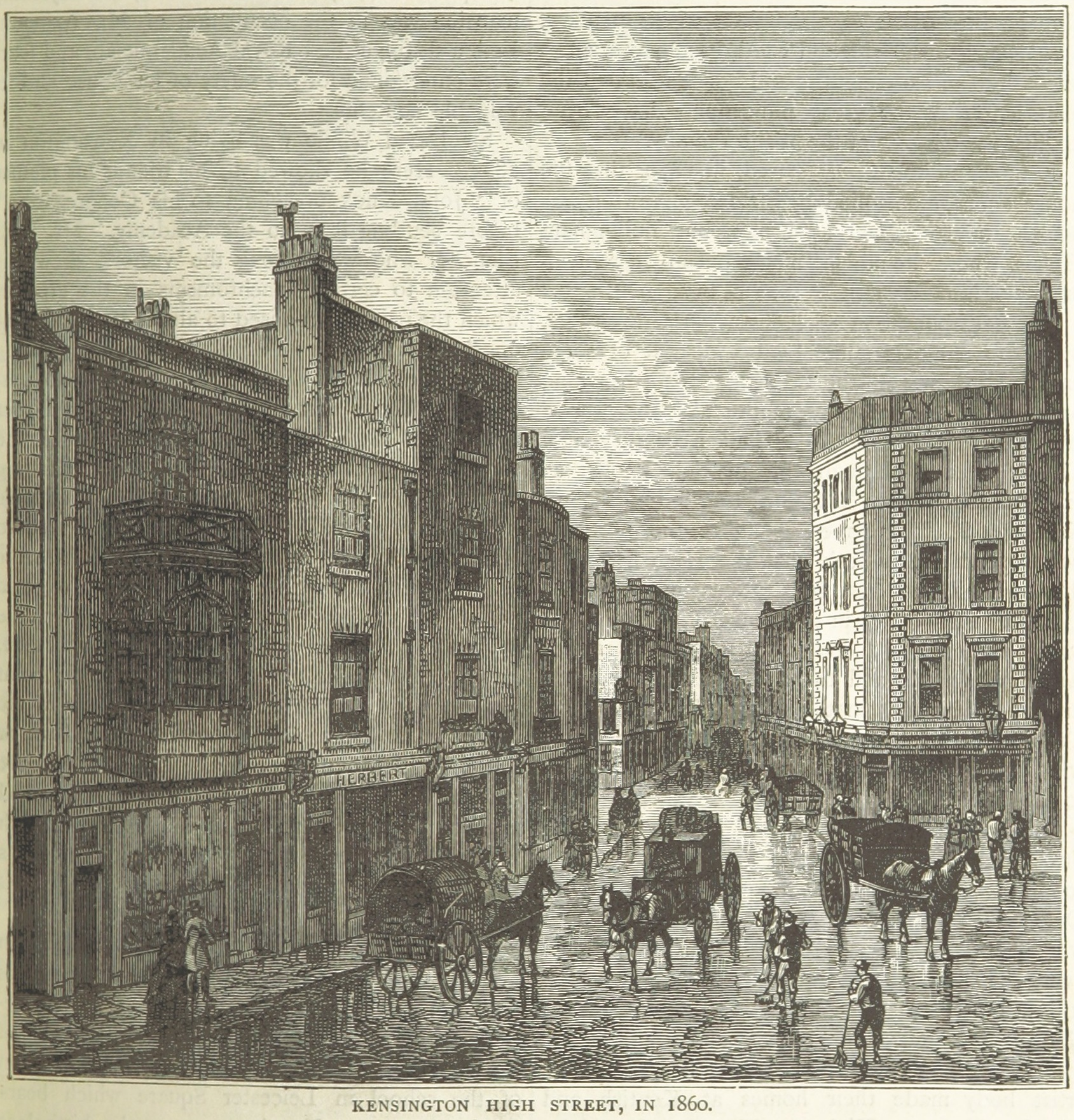
Kensington High Street in 1860

Residents have included:

- Sir Graham Berry, Premier of Victoria, Australia
- Sir Henry Cole, museum founder
- Reverend George Davys, tutor to Queen Victoria
- Kenelm Digby, writer
- Lady Christiana Gayer, daughter of Robert Bruce, 1st Earl of Ailesbury
- John Leech, cartoonist
- Sir David Wilkie, artist.

== Retail centre ==
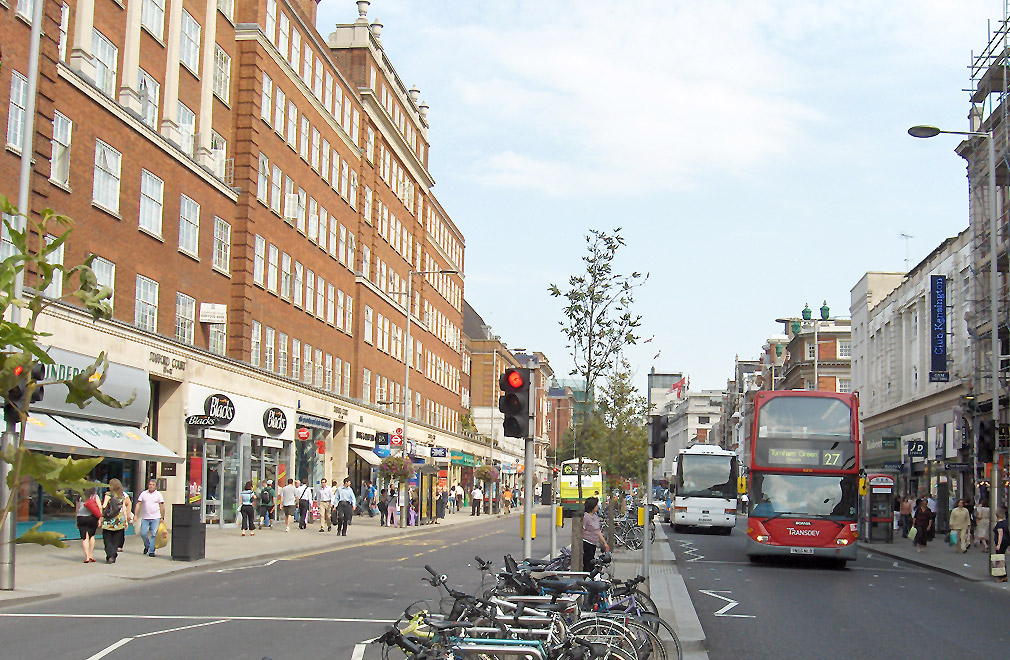
Middle of Kensington High Street

Kensington High Street is one of West London most popular shopping streets, with upmarket shops serving a wealthy area. From the late 19th century until the mid-1970s the street had three classic department stores: Barkers of Kensington, Derry & Toms and Pontings. Barkers bought Pontings in 1906 and Derry & Toms in 1920, but continued to run all three as separate entities. In a large building project, which started in 1930 and was not complete until 1958 (the Second World War halted the project), the company made Derry & Toms and Barkers into Art Deco palaces. On top of Derry & Toms, Europe's largest roof garden area (1.5 acres (6,100 m^{2})) was created, consisting of three different gardens with 500 species of plants, fountains, a stream, duck, flamingos and a restaurant – said to serve the best high tea in Kensington.

In 1957, House of Fraser bought the Barkers Group and started to dismantle it. Pontings was closed in 1971, Derry & Toms in 1973, and a much condensed Barkers (from 600,000 square feet (56,000 m^{2}) over seven floors to 140,000 square feet (13,000 m^{2}) on less than four floors) was allowed to continue until January 2006, when the 135-year-old department store was closed for good.

Part of the Barker premises has now been taken over by American Whole Foods Market, which opened the UK's first organic superstore there in June 2007. The rest was added to existing office space used by the headquarters of Associated Newspapers.

Kensington High Street was also the site of Biba in the 1960s and early 1970s. When Derry & Toms closed, the iconic store took the building and accentuated its Art Deco style further. But the 1970s recession, coupled with idealistic business ideas, killed Biba in 1975. The Derry & Toms roof gardens still remain, now known as the Kensington Roof Gardens which Richard Branson's Virgin occupied as a tenant from 1981 to 2018.

Kensington Market opened on Kensington High Street in 1967. It was a three-story building of contemporary fashion. It closed in 2000.

Kensington High Street's future as a shopping street has been threatened by the large Westfield London, which opened a short distance away in Shepherd's Bush in late 2008. However, these factors may be offset to some extent – or even outweighed – by recent changes to the road layout, intended to make the street a more pleasant place to shop. The Royal Borough of Kensington and Chelsea decided to experiment with the concept of shared space, which deputy leader Daniel Moylan had studied abroad. Railings and pedestrian crossings were removed, thereby enabling pedestrians to cross the street wherever they choose. Bicycle racks were placed on the central reservation. The effect over two years was a reduction in accidents, down 44% against a London average of 17%.

Kensington High Street is also home to a large part of the British music industry, with the UK offices of major labels such as Universal Music Group, Sony Music, Warner Music Group and EMI all situated in the area.

Furthermore, the second Kahn Design boutique in London is also located on this street.

It is also the site of the former Roman Catholic Pro-Cathedral of England, Our Lady of Victories, now a parish church; Kensington Arcade; and a building housing the Consulate of Romania and the Embassy of Paraguay.

== Transport links ==
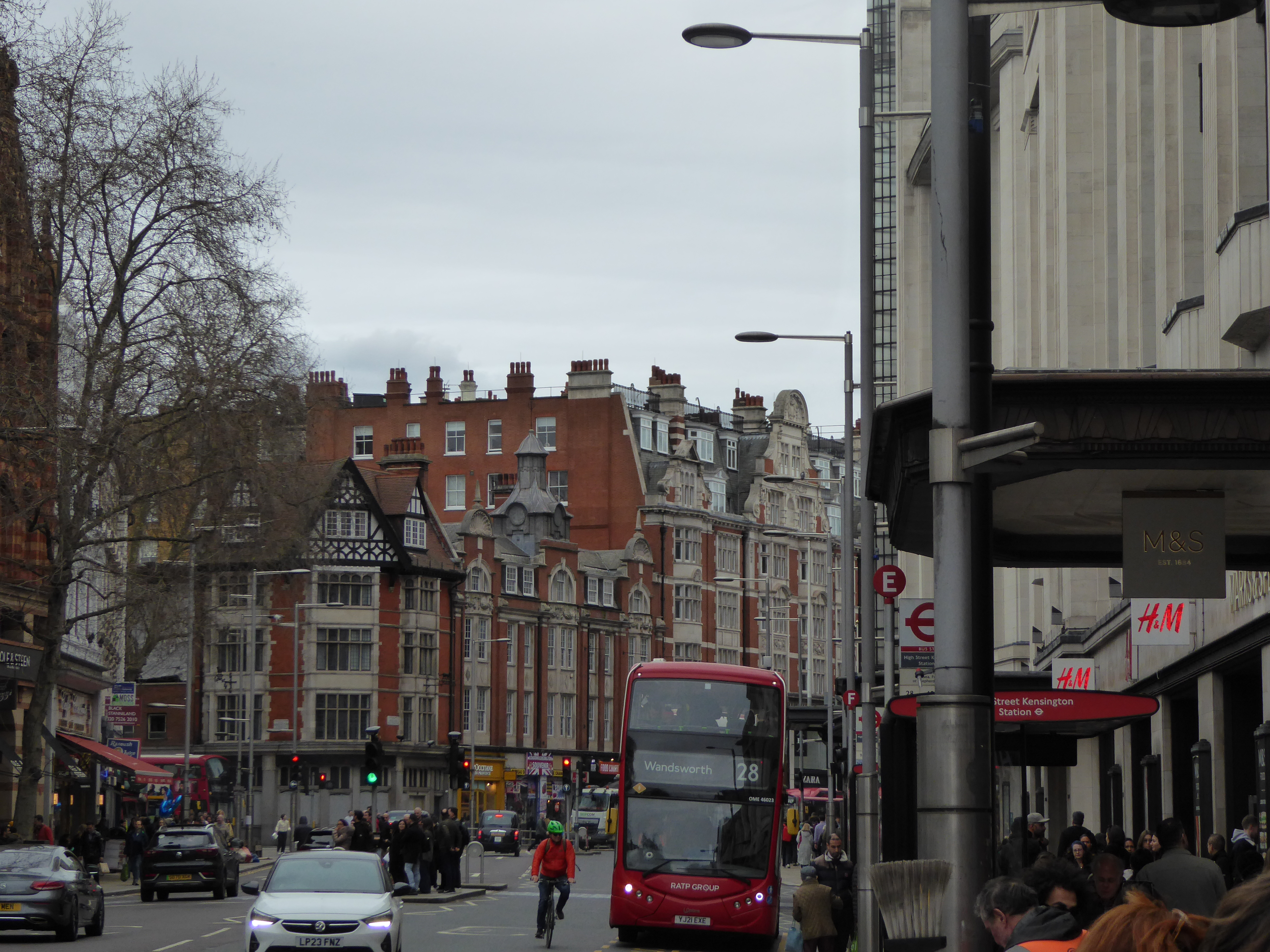
Street level view of Kensington High Street in 2024, standing directly outside the High Street Kensington Tube Station

Kensington High Street is served by bus routes 9, 23, 27, 28, 49, 52, 70, 328, 452, C1, night routes N9, N27, N28, N31 and Greenline routes 701 and 702. It is also served by High Street Kensington Underground station, on the Circle and District lines.
