= Tomomi Yamaguchi =

Japanese anthropologist

Tomomi Yamaguchi is a Japanese anthropologist. Her specialist areas are feminism, popular culture, nationalism, and social movements in contemporary Japan.

== Biography ==
Yamaguchi completed a Ph.D. in anthropology at the University of Michigan in 2004. She is a professor of anthropology at Montana State University.

She is an editor of the Asia-Pacific Journal, Japan Focus.
