= Spark Energy =

Scottish energy supply company

- Industry: Utilities
- Founded: 2007
- Founder: Chris Gauld & PJ Darling
- Defunct: 31 December 2020
- Fate: Absorbed
- Successor: OVO Energy
- Headquarters: Selkirk, Scotland, UK
- Area served: United Kingdom
- Key people: Chris Gauld (CEO)
- Products: Natural gas; Electricity
- Number of employees: 400 (2018)
- Parent: OVO Energy (November 2018 -)
- Website: sparkenergy.co.uk

Spark Energy was an electricity and gas supplier in the United Kingdom, established in 2007 and headquartered in Selkirk, Scottish Borders. Its operating company Spark Energy Supply Ltd entered administration in November 2018, and industry regulator Ofgem appointed OVO Energy to take over Spark Energy's 290,000 customer accounts.

== History ==
Spark Energy began in 2007 as a small start-up company. The board's background was in the letting industry and they started Spark Energy to fill a gap in the utility market to meet the needs of letting agents, landlords and tenants. The company was established by Canadian entrepreneur PJ Darling, after research into the utilities and property management markets. Co-founder Chris Gauld was the primary driver and leader of the business during the early stages.

Spark was based in a former converted mill building in Town hill after moving from Penlan in 2016. The company made its first profit in 2013. In January 2014 the firm signed a deal with Morgan Stanley. Further growth occurred, which the company attributed to investment in its customer services and marketing. Some rebranding also took place, including the introduction of the tagline 'Bringing Energy to Life'.

In Spring 2014, Gauld was appointed as chief executive after Darling sold his stake in the business. In 2014 they were placed 23rd on the Sunday Times Fast Track 100, the highest-ranked Scottish company on the list.

Spark had a long relationship with both Scottish Enterprise and the Scottish Investment Bank, with the latter having invested around £855,000 with the company since 2008.

In 2015, Spark Energy reported a turnover of more than £80 million. As of July 2015 the company was thought to be one of the five largest employers in the Scottish Borders, with over 300 staff based at their offices in Selkirk, 120 of whom are in customer care. In August 2015 the company recruited three senior executives, increasing the size of its leadership team. The company was granted a temporary derogation from regulator Ofgem from 22B.2(b) and paragraph 4 of SLC 22B of its gas and electricity supply licences in respect of the Affordable Social Housing Prepayment Tariff.

In June 2016, the company announced that a management buyout, led by CEO Chris Gauld and CFO Hamish Osborn, was close to completion in a deal estimated to be worth in excess of £50 million.

In 2016, the company acquired a 50% stake in a Sussex-based telecoms company, Home Telecom Ltd, for an estimated £3 million, as part of a mutual and existing relationship with Country Wide who owned the other 50% of the business. This saw the firm acquire approximately 14,000 telecoms customers.

=== Demise ===
Spark Energy Supply ceased trading on 23 November 2018 following financial difficulties, including non-payment of £14m to energy regulator Ofgem under the Renewables Obligation scheme. Ofgem appointed Bristol-based OVO Energy to take over the 290,000 customer accounts, and OVO also acquired Spark Energy Limited.

OVO initially retained the company's Selkirk offices and staff, but closed those offices in 2020. Spark customers were moved to the SSE brand, which was ultimately replaced with OVO's own by 2023. Spark Energy Limited was dissolved in 2023.

== Issues ==
While establishing itself in the marketplace, the company had attracted a substantial number of complaints. Their business model meant that tenants did not get to choose their supplier, with Spark Energy inheriting customers from property owners, demanding payments and forcing customers to have the firm as their energy supplier. BBC Radio 4’s You & Yours consumer programme revealed that Spark Energy employees had posed as some of these customers, moving people with chronic debts to other energy firms without their knowledge, using their personal details. In 2015 they were fined £250,000 by Ofgem, after they were judged to have mistreated customers during the 2010–2013 period by impersonating customers to switch 'undesirable' customers from whom payment was difficult to collect, to other suppliers, a term known in the industry as 'erroneous transfers'.

The company rebranded and undertook a several-year-long campaign in an attempt to revive their image and customer service practices, and in the 2014 Which? Switch energy satisfaction survey, Spark Energy outranked all of the "big six" providers. However, in the 2017 Which? survey Spark was ranked 30th out of 31 providers.
