= Mudrick Capital Management =

American investment firm

- Type: Limited Partnership
- Industry: Private equity, Special situations
- Founded: 2009; 17 years ago
- Founders: Jason Mudrick
- Headquarters: New York City, United States
- Products: Private equity funds, Hedge funds, vulture funds
- Total assets: $3.3 billion
- Website: www.mudrickcapital.com

Mudrick Capital Management is an American investment firm and vulture fund specializing in special situations and event driven investing that include investing in distressed securities. The firm was founded by Jason Mudrick, its current Chief Investment Officer, in 2009. The firm is located in New York City and, as of June 2022, managed approximately $3.3 billion in assets.

Mudrick Capital typically seeks an event, such as a balance sheet restructuring, a spin-off of assets or the modification of a corporate strategy, that can allow it to capture an undervaluation spread.

== History ==
In 2016, Mudrick Capital’s Distressed Opportunity Fund ranked 1st on Bloomberg’s 100 top-performing large hedge funds with a 38.7% return that year.

In September 2017, the firm converted its 15.3% stake in Verso Corporation, a paper milling company, into an activist holding, citing frustration with the board’s inaction to address the company’s poor performance. In response, Verso announced its board had formed a strategic alternatives committee as well as the resignation of its chairman Rob Amen. Mudrick Capital then switched its stake back to passive.

In May 2018, Mudrick Capital filed a lawsuit against satellite communications company Globalstar, where Mudrick is the largest outside investor, with a 5.6 percent stake, over its proposed merger with FiberLight LLC, stating that the terms of the deal were overvalued at $1.65 billion. That deal was called off by Globalstar in August 2018.

In September 2018, Mudrick Capital and HG Vora Capital Management LLC managed an outbidding for Pebblebrook Hotel Trust to acquire LaSalle Hotel Properties for $5.2 billion instead of the $4.8 billion all-cash deal by Blackstone Group LP.

Mudrick Capital was one of the top performing hedge funds in 2019 with an annual gain of 28.8 percent, compared with the average hedge fund, which was up 11.4 per cent. Much of the fund’s success that year was the result of its 51 percent ownership interest in NJOY, which it had purchased in 2017, when the company was on the brink of bankruptcy. By 2017 the company’s sales were up by over 1,100 percent year-on-year.

In January 2021, Mudrick Capital posted gains of $200 million, or 9.8 percent, most of which came from debt and equity options of AMC Entertainment Holdings, Inc. The previous month Mudrick had provided AMC $100 million in new financing in exchange for bonds and 8 million shares. Furthermore, Mudrick exchanged $100 million of AMC bonds due in 2026 for close to 14 million additional shares. The stock then soared in January due to retail investors rallying on the internet forum Reddit. According to Reuters, Mudrick Capital was seen as a hero by the retail investors because the firm did not short sell AMC’s stock, but rather helped rescue the company through clever financing.

Also in January 2021, Mudrick took over a credit hedge fund previously owned by CVC Credit Partners, further expanding the firm’s European presence.

In April 2021, Mudrick Capital Acquisition Corporation II, a publicly traded special purpose acquisition company (SPAC), announced an agreement with Topps by which the trading card company would become a public company. Michael Eisner's firm The Tornante Company will roll its stake into the new company while Mudrick Capital will lead an additional investment of $250 million. The deal values Topps at $1.3 billion. On April 28, 2021, Topps issued their first NFT ever in partnership with 2021 1st overall NFL draft pick, Trevor Lawrence. The 6-piece collection sold for US$225,000 on mintable.com.

== Funds ==
Since its inception in 2009, Mudrick Capital has raised several funds to invest in special situations:

- Mudrick Distressed Opportunity Fund
- Mudrick Distressed Opportunity Drawdown Fund
- Mudrick Distressed Opportunity Specialty Fund
- Mudrick Distressed Energy Co-Investment Fund
- Mudrick Distressed Senior Secured Fund Global
- Mudrick Distressed Opportunity Fund II
- Mudrick Distressed Opportunity Fund II Supplemental Capital
- Verto Direct Opportunity
- Verto Direct Opportunity II
