= Barkers of Kensington =

1870–2006 department store in London

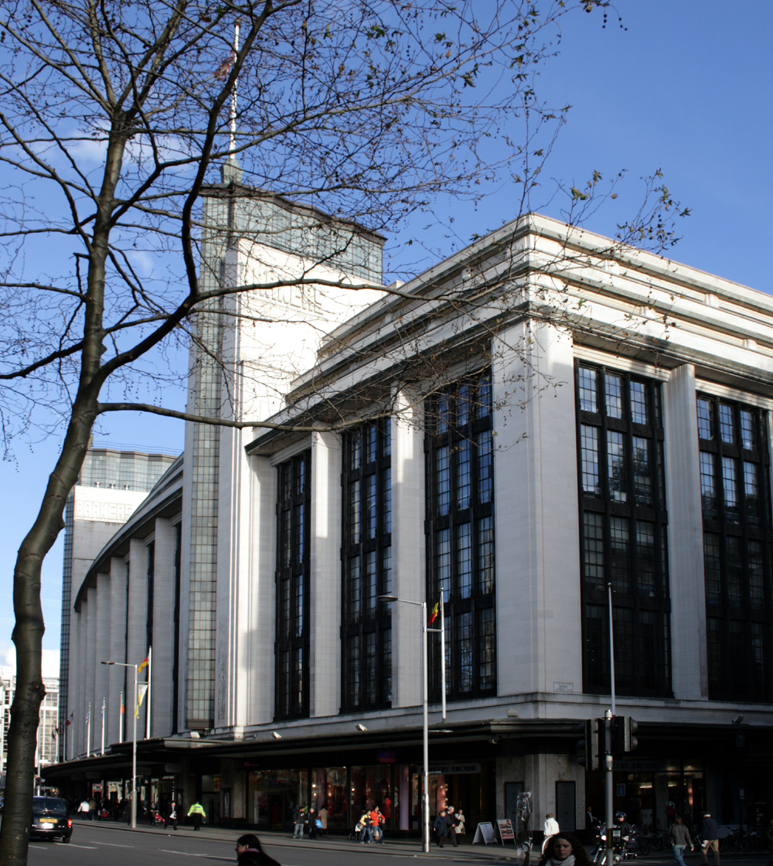
- Location: Kensington, London, England
- Coordinates: 51.5019°N 0.1906°W
- Address: Kensington High Street
- Opened: 1870
- Closed: 2006
- Owner: 1870–1957 John Barker & Co. 1957–2006 House of Fraser

Barkers of Kensington was a department store in Kensington High Street, Kensington, London. It began as a small drapery business, John Barker & Company, founded by John Barker and James Whitehead in 1870. Barkers grew rapidly to become one of London's largest and most well-known department stores.

The company played a significant role in establishing Kensington High Street as one of London's principal shopping destinations for most of the twentieth century. The business was purchased by House of Fraser in 1957. Barkers closed permanently in 2006. Part of the former flagship building now contains a branch of Whole Foods Market (2019).

== Early history ==
In 1870 John Barker and James Whitehead opened a small drapery business at 91–93 Kensington High Street. James Whitehead (a city merchant) was the investor, while John Barker ran the store. John Barker's plan was to start small and grow his business to a full-line department store. He started by dealing direct with manufacturers to get the best price, and with the profits made he started buying up freeholds and leases of nearby properties.

By the end of 1870 he had annexed 26–28 Ball Street, setting up millinery and dressmaking departments. By 1871, he had purchased 87 Kensington High Street and opened men's tailoring and children's outfitting departments. Within a year he had again grown by buying his neighbours' businesses at 89 Kensington High Street and 26 Ball Street. By 1880, he had extended his stores at 87–89 Kensington High Street and had bought an ironmongery business at 14–16 Ball Street and added 75–77 Kensington High Street and 12 Ball Street to his premises. By 1892, the business had swallowed up 63–71 Kensington High Street, 2–6 Young Street and 6 Ball Street and now operated over forty two departments and workshops.

== John Barker & Co Ltd ==
In 1894, the business was incorporated with John Barker as the chairman of the board, joined by his brother Francis and H H Johnstone (both established partners in the firm), along with Tresham Gilbey (his son-in-law) and J G Barnes, the former manager of the Kensington branch of Parr's Banking Co. In the same year the business bought Seaman Little & Co, a large competitor, which had divided up the Barker premises. The company at this point had 33 shops, including sixteen fronting onto Kensington High Street. By this time the business had grown to 64 departments selling everything from clothes to groceries. It even had its own drug-dispensing department.

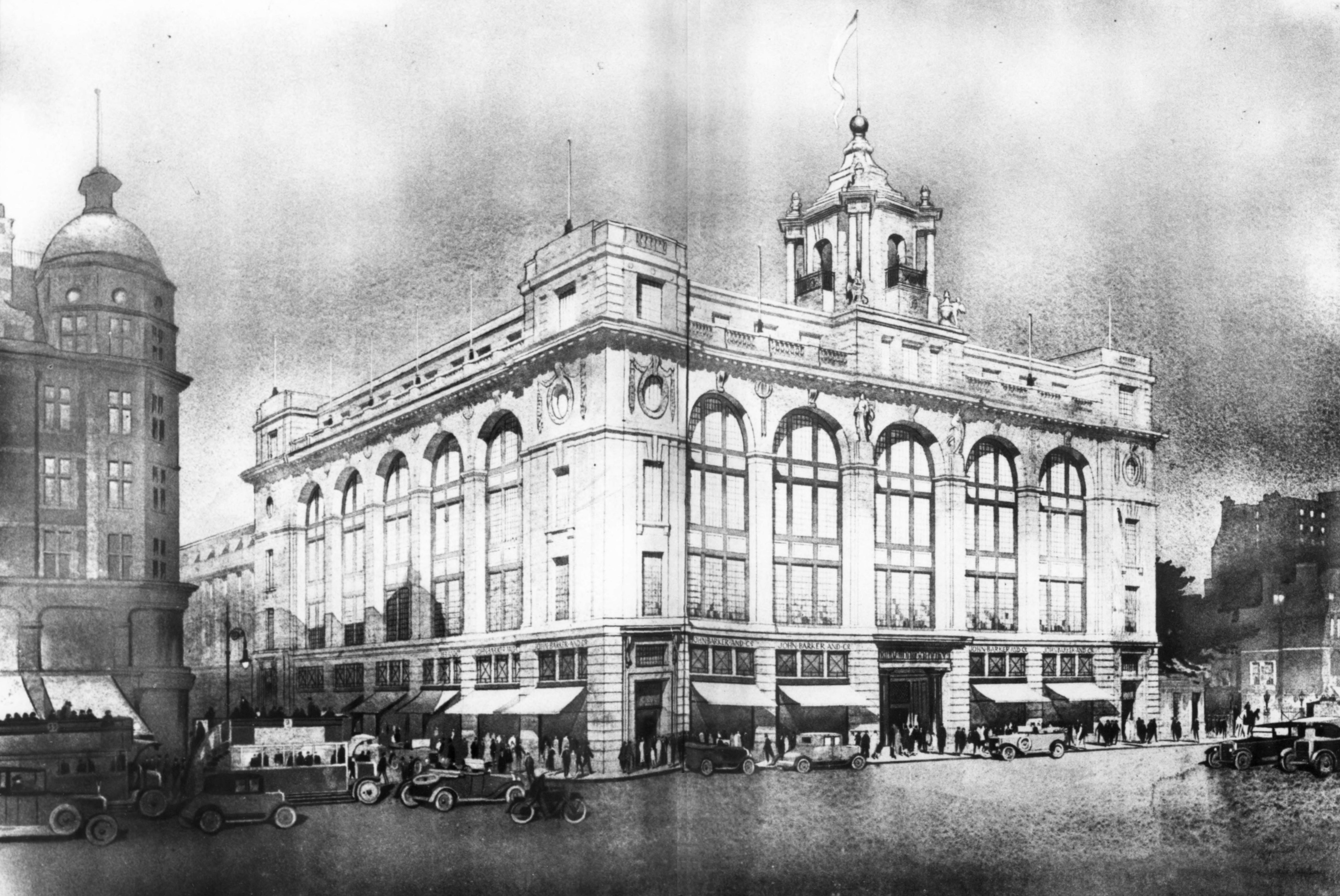
The 1924 store at 26-40 Kensington High Street, designed by Sir Reginald Blomfield and H. L. Cabuche

By 1895 the company had purchased every property on the south side of Kensington High Street between King Street and Young Street, except for numbers 73 and 85, which the business would go on to acquire in 1900. New space allowed for the addition of jewellery, watch, and bicycle departments to the ever-growing assortment. In 1907 Barkers bought its near neighbour Ponting Brothers, but continued to run the store as a separate concern.

In 1912, the earliest section of the Barkers store was devastated by fire. Temporary premises were located opposite whilst rebuilding was commenced by Barkers' own construction department in 1913. John Barker, the store's founder, died in 1914. He was replaced as chairman by Sidney Skinner, who had worked his way up in the firm after joining in 1889. The First World War devastated the Barkers business and activities were scaled back.

After the war, the policy of expansion was resumed with the purchase of neighbouring competitor, Derry & Toms, in 1920. The store was located in between the Barkers and Pontings stores, and again was run as a separate entity.

In 1924 the business opened new shops in Liverpool, Birmingham and Manchester selling pianos and gramophones, but this venture proved a failure and the provincial branches were shut in 1926. More successful was the 1925 acquisition of Zeeta Cake Company, a high-class bakery and confectionery business, created in 1919 by a group of John Barker & Co directors. The purchase extended Barkers' own already well-established catering operations and eventually up to twenty Zeeta branches would be opened in the London area.

A large new furniture building at 26–40 Kensington High Street was opened in 1926. The site had previously been occupied by the temporary home of a number of departments following the fire of 1912, with the freehold acquired by the company in 1919.

== 1930 to 1957 ==
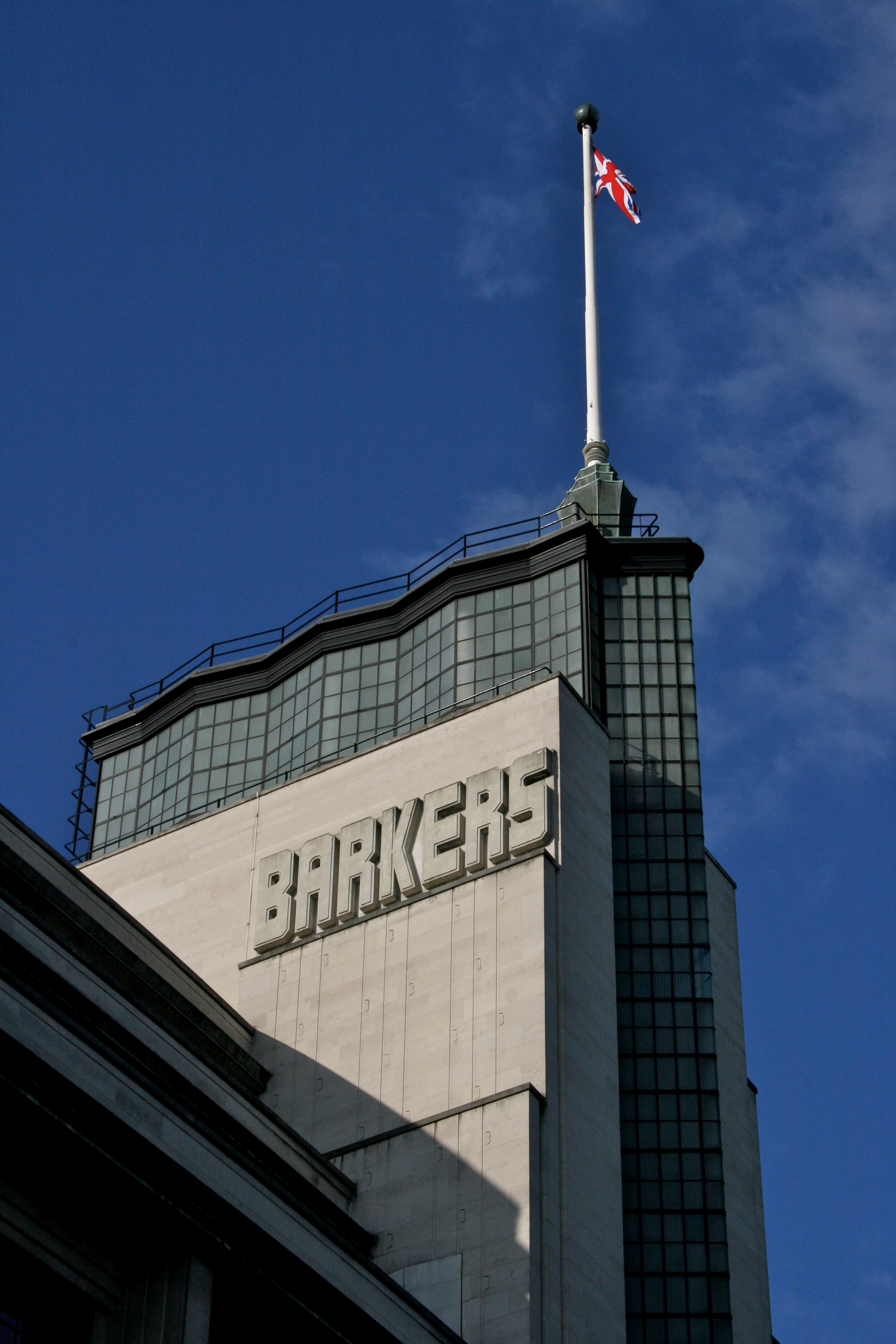
The Barkers sign, still visible on the building

During the 1930s the company started ambitious work to rebuild both the Barkers and Derry & Toms stores in a phased development. This plan included building over Ball Street and moving the frontages of the stores back some 30 feet to assist in the widening of Kensington High Street. At the same time Pontings' store was extended along Wrights Lane.

The buildings were designed by in-house architect Bernard George, with the new Derry & Toms store opening in 1933. Barkers' redevelopment, however, was interrupted by the Second World War, and was not finally completed until 1958.

Despite bomb damage to Derry & Toms, the Barker businesses maintained profits during the war and continued to grow. In 1947 the old-established drapery business of Gosling & Sons in Richmond was purchased. The possibility of buying Selfridges, in Oxford Street, was seriously explored in 1951. Further growth was realised with the purchase of Dale & Kerley in Terminus Road, Eastbourne, in 1953.

== House of Fraser ownership ==
In August 1957, House of Fraser bought the business and soon began a programme of rationalisation. Between 1959 and 1962 the Zeeta shops were disposed of along with surplus properties on Kensington High Street and Young Street. In 1965 the construction and decorating department of the business was formally incorporated as John Barker (Construction & Development) Ltd, while in 1968 the Richmond business of Gosling & Sons was closed to allow for the construction of a new Dickins & Jones store on the site, completed in 1970.

By 1971, the business was further downsized by the closure of the Pontings store and the sale of its freehold. The entire Pontings stock was transferred to the lower ground floor of Barkers which became known as Ponting's Bargain Basement. In the same year the freehold of Derry & Toms' building was sold to British Land, though Derry & Toms would continue to trade until 1973.

In 1972, following the accommodation of Pontings' business, a refurbishment of the main Barker store was carried out to allow for the absorption of Derry & Toms' trade.

In 1973, House of Fraser purchased the Army & Navy Stores group. Barkers of Kensington became a flagship store of Army & Navy whilst always retaining the Barkers name.

Between 1976 and 1978 the store was further refurbished, with a revised food hall, new china and glass departments, first floor fashion department, installation of automatic lifts, and the closure of the Pontings basement, to be replaced by new hardware and electrical departments.

In 1982, the store was downsized from seven to four floors and architects were commissioned to redesign the site. The redeveloped Barkers building was completed in 1986 with lettable office space taking the largest area. In addition, the reconfigured building incorporated garden terraces, an arcade of small shops on the ground floor and a much reduced Barkers department store. The formal company of John Barker & Co Ltd was wound up voluntarily by House of Fraser in 1988.

Trading at Barkers continued until 2006. The 135-year-old store was closed as part of a further rationalisation of the House of Fraser business.

The building is now occupied by a branch of Whole Foods.
