= OVO Energy =

Energy supply company based in Bristol, United Kingdom

OVO Energy Ltd
- Industry: Retail supply of energy
- Founded: 2009; 17 years ago
- Headquarters: Bristol, England, UK
- Parent: E.ON UK
- Website: www.ovoenergy.com

OVO Energy is an energy supplier based in Bristol, England. It has been owned by E.ON UK since October 2026.

It was founded by Stephen Fitzpatrick and began trading energy in September 2009, buying and selling electricity and gas to supply domestic properties throughout the UK. By June 2017, OVO had 680,000 customers, an increase of 10,000 over the previous year, representing a 2.5% domestic market share. Although at first one of over 15 smaller energy companies competing with the Big Six, which dominated the market, in January 2020, OVO completed the acquisition of the retail arm of SSE, becoming the country's third-largest domestic energy supply company.

In October 2026, E.ON UK acquired OVO, with the combined company forming Britain's second-largest energy supplier.

== History ==
OVO Energy is British-owned and privately backed, with its headquarters in Bristol. The company has supplied gas and electricity to domestic customers since 2009. This sector of the UK economy has in the past been dominated by a number of large companies known as the Big Six.

In November 2018, OVO acquired one of its rivals, Spark Energy, after the troubled supplier ceased trading. The acquisition included a subsidiary, Home Telecom Limited, which specialises in providing telephone and broadband services to tenants of private landlords.

In September 2019, OVO agreed to pay £500 million for SSE Energy Services, the retail business of SSE plc, and the purchase – which included SSE's 8,000 employees and their phone, broadband and heating insurance customers – was completed in January 2020. This made OVO the UK's second-largest energy supply company (after British Gas) with around 5 million customers. OVO stated that the SSE brand would continue for the time being. SSE had earlier intended to merge the business with Innogy's subsidiary Npower, but this was called off in December 2018. Following OVO Energy's takeover of SSE, numerous reports of incorrect and inflated bills were reported by former SSE consumers who had their accounts transferred to OVO Energy.

In February 2019, Mitsubishi Corporation bought a 20 percent stake in OVO, valuing the company at £1bn.

In June 2025, it was reported that OVO Energy and Iberdrola (the owner of Scottish Power) were in exploratory talks about a merger.

In May 2026, E.ON announced it had reached an agreement to acquire OVO Energy, subject to regulatory approval. The Competition and Markets Authority approved the acquisition on 1 October 2026, and it completed on 8 October 2026. The combined company is Britain's second-largest energy supplier, holding a 25% market share.

== Energy market competition ==
The entry of OVO into the UK supply market in 2009 was welcomed as it increased competition in a market that had been criticised for high prices.

In October 2013, OVO's Founder Stephen Fitzpatrick appeared at the Energy and Climate Change Select Committee, when energy companies were asked to justify recent gas and electricity price rises. Fitzpatrick explained to the committee that the 'wholesale gas price had actually got cheaper', contrary to the Big Six energy suppliers' assertions that international global prices of gas and electricity had consistently risen.

Following the collapse of Economy Energy in January 2019, regulator Ofgem announced that OVO Energy would take on Economy Energy's 235,000 customers.

== Sponsorship ==
In 2016, OVO sponsored the Bristol leg of the Tour of Britain cycling race. In 2017, the company began sponsoring both The Women's Tour and the Tour of Britain, the longest cycle stage races taking place in the UK. In March 2018, OVO announced they would begin providing equal prize money for both tours. They are no longer sponsoring either race as of 2021.

In October 2021, OVO Energy took over sponsorship of Glasgow's entertainment and multi-purpose indoor arena, which was rebranded as the OVO Hydro. OVO Live allows customers to get access to ticket presales, VIP queue-jump entry, and VIP lounges at OVO Hydro Glasgow and OVO Arena Wembley.

== Management ==
Stacey Cartwright was appointed as chair of the retail board at OVO Energy in April 2020. She holds other directorships including at Savills, Genpact and the Football Association, and was deputy chair at retailer Harvey Nichols. Non-executive directors include Jonson Cox, chair of water regulator Ofwat.

== Regulator actions ==
Since 2020, OVO Energy has been the subject of regulatory actions, largely due to overcharging and sub-par customer service.

In January 2020, OVO Energy agreed to pay £8.9m into Ofgem's voluntary redress fund, after an investigation by Ofgem found instances of undercharging and overcharging, and inaccurate annual statements sent to more than half a million customers between 2015 and 2018. Head of Ofgem enforcement, Anthony Pygram, said "The supplier did not prioritise putting these issues right whilst its business was expanding."

In March 2021, as part of a wider investigation into price protection failings by energy suppliers, OVO's practices were found to have caused detriment to 240,563 customers totalling over £2m, and the company was required to pay redress of over £2.8m – the highest amount of compensation among the 18 companies investigated.

Overcharging of consumers was reported several times in 2022. In May 2023, Ofgem found that OVO had charged almost 11,000 customers more than the maximum allowed under the Energy Price Guarantee scheme. The company was required to refund and compensate those customers, the average amount being £181 per customer; and to pay £10,000 into Ofgem's redress fund.

In 2022, OVO Energy was ranked second worst (only behind Utilita) in customer service by Citizens Advice.

In September 2025, the Financial Times reported that OVO Group had warned of a "material uncertainty" over its ability to continue as a going concern, citing uncertainty over a capitalisation plan needed to meet new Ofgem requirements. The report said OVO was among three firms failing to meet Ofgem's newly introduced capital buffer requirements, and had secured a £60 million loan from Cheyne Capital Management at a high compound interest rate. In February 2026, energy analyst Kathryn Porter wrote in Watt-Logic that OVO was one of five suppliers in breach of Ofgem's regulatory capital obligations and had refinanced its operations with a sub-investment-grade loan, paying 12% plus an unspecified uplift.

In January 2026, OVO Energy was fined and ordered to pay £2.8 million in compensation to customers after it failed to pass on government support to 11,646 customers for 19 months.

In April 2026, the Good Shopping Guide gave OVO Energy a below-benchmark score in its Ethical Energy Suppliers Ratings Table, rating the company poorly for its energy mix, ethical accreditation and other criticisms.

In June 2026, an Ofgem investigation concluded that OVO had failed to adequately monitor vulnerable pre-payment meter customers, leaving those customers at risk of harm. As a result, OVO agreed to a settlement including a payment of £7m into Ofgem’s voluntary redress fund and a £3.4m package of credit and debt relief for some of its most vulnerable customers in lieu of compensation.
