= Safran EngineUS =

ENGINeUS
- Type: Electric
- National origin: France
- Manufacturer: Safran
- Designer: Safran

The Safran ENGINeUS is a family of electric motors for aircraft propulsion developed by Safran. In early 2025, the engine had a maximum output of 125 kilowatts.

== History ==
At the October 2018 NBAA convention, Safran presented its ENGINeUS electric motor range up to 500 kW (670 hp) designed for electric aircraft, starting with a 45 kW (60 hp) one with integrated control electronics, with an energy efficiency of over 94% and a power-to-weight ratio of 2.5 kW / kg at 2,500 rpm and 172 N⋅m (127 lb⋅ft) of torque, for a 18-kilogram (40 lb) weight with the controller, 12 kilograms (26 lb) without.

The engine originally had output up to 100 kW (130 hp).

In 2020, Bye Aerospace began using the EngineUS 100 product on its eFlyer 2 and eFlyer 4 electric aircraft.

In Feb. 2025, manufacturers such as Electra, Diamond, VoltAero, CAE, and Bye Aerospace were using the engines.

In February 2025, the ENGINeUS series became the first engine certified as airworthy under the EASA special condition SC E-19, for electric and hybrid propulsion engines. The approval allowed Safran to begin installing them on small aircraft, beginning with the eDA40 by Diamond Aircraft. The approval process had taken four years. With the announcement, Safran said it would begin increasing production, and Safran was building four production lines in the UK and France with the intent of producing around 1,000 of the motors per year.

Ascendance in March 2025 selected ENGINeUS for its prototype flying ATEA, a hybrid-electrical helicopter.

== Design ==
In early 2025, the engine had a maximum output of 125 kilowatts.

The ENGINeUS 45 air-cooled direct-drive Smart Motor (integrating motor and power electronic converter) produces 70 kW (94 hp) maximum and 45 kW (60 hp) continuously, has a power-to-weight ratio of 2.5 kW/kg at 2,500 rpm and an efficiency over 94%.

== Applications ==
- SOCATA TBM-based EcoPulse: distributed hybrid-electric propulsion demonstrator, planned to fly in 2022; six ENGINeUS-driven propellers integrated into the wing.
- VoltAero Cassio: modified Cessna 337 Skymaster with two tractor ENGINeUS 45 on the wing, planned to fly in November 2019.

== See also ==
- MagniX
- Siemens SP90G
- Siemens SP260D
