= VoltAero Cassio =

French hybrid electric aircraft

Cassio
- The Cassio 330 updated configuration with a conventional T-Tail and twin pusher propellers

General information
- Type: hybrid electric aircraft
- National origin: France
- Manufacturer: VoltAero
- Status: Under development

History
- Introduction date: planned 2027
- First flight: modified testbed : 10 March 2020 prototype : planned early 2026

The VoltAero Cassio is a family of hybrid electric aircraft being developed by startup company VoltAero. The company plans to produce three configurations of the Cassio aircraft: the four-place Cassio 330, the six-place Cassio 480, and the ten-place Cassio 600.

== Development ==
The testbed is a modified Cessna 337 Skymaster with two front electric motors

VoltAero was established in Royan in September 2017 by the CTO and test pilot of the 2014 Airbus E-Fan 1.0, with the support of the French Nouvelle-Aquitaine region. The company is assembling a testbed based on the Cessna 337 Skymaster, which was intended to fly in late February 2019. The clean-sheet, all-composite Cassio prototype should follow in 2020, deliveries were initially anticipated in late 2021 or early 2022.

For ground-testing the propulsion system, a Skymaster airframe was modified into an iron bird, on static display at the June 2019 Paris Air Show. The Skymaster testbed should fly without its nose engine in September 2019, and with the hybrid power module replacing the rear engine before the end of the year. The initial power module uses a Nissan automobile engine, followed by an in-house multifuel engine development. Building three prototypes and a structural test article will need a new fundraising. The first production aircraft would be delivered by the end of 2022.

By October 2019, VoltAero had upgraded its testbed with two Safran EngineUS 45 motors, each producing 70 kW (94 hp) maximum and 45 kW (60 hp) continuously, installed on the wing with tractor propellers. November flight tests from Royan – Médis Aerodrome will keep both piston engines for 15 hours, before removing the forward piston engine for 10 hours. The aft hybrid system has a 170 kW (228 hp) Nissan car engine developed with Solution F, with an additional 60 kW (80 hp) Emrax electric motor on the same shaft, for 100 hours of tests including endurance and demonstration flights. By March 2020, flight trials had begun for the hybrid-electric with its push-pull triple propeller configuration, before unveiling the Cassio 2 on 24 March.

The previous configuration: a three-surface aircraft with a single pusher propeller and a twin boom tail

In May 2020, VoltAero presented the production Cassio family: the 330 kW (440 hp) combined Cassio 330 offering four seats, to be delivered from 2022, the later 480 kW (640 hp) Cassio 480 seating six and the 600 kW (800 hp) Cassio 600 accommodating ten people. The six-seater is planned for 2023 and the 10 seater for 2024.

The prototype Cassio 330 hybrid-electric aircraft prototype was first publicly displayed at the 2023 Paris Air Show, in June 2023. Powered by a four-cylinder Kawasaki engine, it will be used for airframe design flight testing prior to the installation of a hybrid powerplant.

In June 2025, VoltAero made public a redesign with a conventional T-tail and two fuselage-mounted pusher electric motors, similar to the Piaggio P180 or the Airbus E-Fan. The configuration replaces the previous twin-boom tail and single pusher propeller, to avoid blade detachment certification difficulties. The fuselage is stretched by 60 cm (23 in) and the parallel hybrid powertrain is replaced by a series one, as the thermal engine is used as a range extender. Power requirements grew higher than the previous 125 kW (168 hp) Safran EngineUS 100, offered up to 180 kW (240 hp), and than the previous 150 kW (200 hp) Kawasaki Ninja motorcycle engine. The first prototype should fly in early 2026 powered by twin Rotax 916s, certification is planned for 2027.

== Design ==
To be certified under EASA CS-23 regulations, the production configuration is a three-surface layout with a forward fixed canard, an aft, mid-mounted wing, and a twin boom, high tail, framing a single pusher propeller powered by an internal combustion engine and electric motors. The maximum gross weight should be 5 t (11,000 lb), with 400 kg (880 lb) of additional weight for the electric motors and the batteries in the nose and in the wingbox. The Cassio will be powered by two 60 kW (80 hp) electric motors driving tractor propellers on the wing and a 170 kW (230 hp) piston engine and 150 kW (200 hp) motor driving a pusher propeller in the aft fuselage.

The combination of fuel and batteries will give it a 1,200 km (650 nmi) range with nine people aboard. It should fly up to 200 km as a pure electric aircraft, 200–600 km (110–320 nmi) as a battery-assisted mild hybrid and over 600 km using more its combustion engine. Its cruise speed should be 200 kn (370 km/h) cruise its endurance 3.5 h, which could be extended to 5 h. The production four-seater targets a 1,800 ft (550 m) field capability within a 2.5 t (5,500 lb) MTOW.

Lower noise should be allowed by the electric taxiing and take off, before hybrid power above 1,200 ft (370 m). Fuel consumption could be reduced by up to 20%, with hybrid cruise until the batteries have discharged to a 20% energy level, before recharging them with the thermal engine. The cost of ownership is targeted for €290/h ($323) and a 10 h per day availability should allow eight daily rotations.

== Specifications (Cassio 1) ==
Data from Aviation Week

General characteristics

- Capacity: 4 to 6 people
- Empty weight: 5,000 kg (11,023 lb)
- Powerplant: 1 × piston engine , 170 kW (230 hp)
- Powerplant: 5 × electric engines , 60 kW (80 hp) each : 2 tractor, 3 in the rear power module

Performance

- Cruise speed: 370 km/h (230 mph, 200 kn)
- Range: 1,200 km (750 mi, 650 nmi) , 200 km (110 nmi) electric only range, hybrid above
- Endurance: 3.5 h

== See also ==
- Ampaire Electric EEL
- Eviation Alice
- Wright Electric
- Zunum Aero
