= Scylax E10 =

German electric aircraft

E10

General information
- Type: Electric aircraft
- National origin: Germany
- Manufacturer: Scylax Aircraft
- Status: Under development

History
- Introduction date: expected 2027
- First flight: expected 2022

The Scylax E10 is a 10-seat all-electric aircraft project by German start-up Scylax Aircraft.

== Design ==
The €2 million all-composite, short take-off and landing design is powered by two electric motors and four 60 kWh (220 MJ) battery packs, it should cover a 160 nmi (300 km) range initially. It aims to replace utility aircraft like the Cessna 402, Cessna 208 Caravan, Beechcraft King Air or Britten-Norman BN-2 Islander for air taxi, air ambulance, cargo, corporate, scheduled passenger and private owners. The 260 kW (350 hp) motors allow a 300 km/h (160 kn) cruise, and it should operate from 300 m (980 ft) runways.

== Development ==
Based in Munich, Scylax was formed by solar-powered light aircraft developer Elektra Solar and aerospace engineering services provider EADCO. Formerly PC-Aero and Elektra-UAS and a spinoff from the DLR German Aerospace Center, Elektra Solar manufactures solar-powered high-altitude aircraft: the single-seat, unmanned or optionally piloted Elektra One and the two-seat Elektra Two. EADCO is an engineering consultancy providing research and development support, from the conceptual and feasibility phases to development and certification to customers like Airbus, ArianeGroup, Grob Aerospace, Premium Aerotec, RUAG and SABCA.

Regional operator FLN Frisia Luftverkehr is a shareholder, aiming to replace its nine-strong Islander fleet. By October 2019, the project was privately funded until the design freeze expected in the near future. Other investors are being sought to build and fly the first prototype in 2022 for €7 million: half from private investors and half through the German government’s "green funding initiatives". Another €70 million will be needed for CS-23 certification in 2027, when battery technology should be more advanced to reach a 600 km (320 nmi) range.

== See also ==
- Zunum Aero
- Eviation Alice
