= Wright Electric =

American Electric Aircraft Manufacturer

- The EasyJet / Wright Electric concept has a distributed propulsion and swappable battery packs
- Type: Private
- Industry: Aerospace
- Founded: 2016; 10 years ago
- Headquarters: Albany, NY, U.S.
- Key people: Jeff Engler (CEO)
- Products: Electric aircraft
- Website: weflywright.com

Wright Electric is an American startup company developing an electric airliner.

== Design ==
The aircraft is to run on batteries and handle flights of under 300 miles. It will feature high aspect-ratio wings for energy efficient flight, distributed electric propulsion and swappable battery packs with advanced cell chemistry.

== History ==
The 10-person Los Angeles based startup was founded in 2016 and has received venture capital from groups such as Silicon Valley accelerator Y Combinator. The company is named after the Wright brothers.

In September 2017, UK budget carrier EasyJet announced it was developing an electric 180-seater for 2027 with Wright Electric. Wright Electric built a two-seat proof-of-concept with 272 kg (600 lb) of batteries, and believes that batteries can be scaled up with substantially lighter new battery chemistries: a 291 nautical mile (540 km) range would suffice for 20% of Easyjet passengers. Wright Electric plans to develop a 10-seater and eventually an at least 120 passengers single-aisle, short-haul airliner and targets 50% lower noise and 10% lower costs.

To evaluate electric propulsion systems, two test stands were constructed: one with two 250 kW UQM motors and two Hartzell Propellers, built with Yates Electrospace, the other on a 10,000 lb (4,500 kg) trailer to be brought to high altitude test sites.

In May 2018, Jetex, a Dubai fixed-base operator with 30 bases, invested in the company.

By November 2018, Wright was testing a commercially available electric motor, before combining it with a Pratt & Whitney Canada PT6A turboprop to be installed on an existing nine-seater for 2019 flight tests, which may be marketed subsequently. Wright is working with Madrid-based Axter Aerospace, already flying its two-seat AX-40S based on a Tecnam P92 with a Rotax piston engine and an electric motor driving the propeller, with four times less power. After a 50-seat model, Darold Cummings, designer of the ESAero ECO-80 turboelectric configuration for NASA, evolved this previous design for the Wright 186-seat airliner with 500 km (270 nm) of range for Easyjet, which could use a more powerful Wright-patented motor.

By November 2019, test flights of the nine-seater were to begin in the coming weeks, while EasyJet partnered with Airbus to study a short-haul airliner concurrently.

In January 2020, Wright Electric revealed that it was constructing a 1.5 MW electric motor and 3 kV inverters intended to power a 186-seat Wright 1 aircraft with a range of at least 300 nmi (560 km) that could enter into service from 2030. Ground testing of the motor is planned for 2021 and flight testing for 2023.

Wright Electric has been granted the Sustainability Award 2020 by World Finance as the world's most sustainable organisation in the aircraft manufacturing industry.

In September 2021, Wright Electric started testing a 2 MW (2,700 hp) electric motor for its 800 nmi (1,500 km) range, 186-passenger Wright 1 airliner to enter service in 2030, partnering with EasyJet and Viva Aerobus. In November 2021, the company announced an all-electric version of the BAe 146 regional jet for a 2024 first flight and a 2026 introduction, replacing its four turbofans with electric motors for an hour of endurance, with power coming from aluminum or hydrogen fuel cells.

== See also ==
- Zunum Aero
- Eviation Alice
