= Tecnam P-Volt =

Suspended Italian electric aircraft project

P-Volt

General information
- Type: Electric aircraft
- National origin: Italy
- Manufacturer: Tecnam
- Status: Development suspended (2023)
- Primary user: Widerøe

The Tecnam P-Volt is an Italian light electric aircraft that was under development by Tecnam in conjunction with Rolls-Royce.

On 13 June 2023 the company announced it was suspending development of the P-Volt due to battery technological limitations.

== Design and development ==
The P-Volt was developed from the Tecnam P2012 Traveller as a nine passenger short-haul aircraft suitable for commuter airline use. Like the Traveller, it was to have a high wing layout with fixed tricycle landing gear. Rolls-Royce was developing the electric power train and the aircraft was projected to have a range of 85 nautical miles per charge.

The range was projected with a 30 minute energy reserve for VFR, and the aircraft would have been difficult to operate with an IFR alternate airport within range.

The company announced that the project was being suspended on 13 June 2023, due to battery technology limitations, expressing concern that the batteries could only assure planned mission completion when new. As the battery performance degraded with use, the only way for operators to fly scheduled routes would be by replacing the batteries after only a few hundred flights, making the aircraft uneconomical to operate.

== Operators ==
In March 2021, Norwegian airline Widerøe had announced their intention to purchase an unknown number of P-Volt aircraft for delivery in 2025 and entry into service in 2026.

== See also ==
- Eviation Alice
