= Clermont Group =

Singapore-based conglomerate

- Formerly: Orient Global, Richard Chandler Corporation, Chandler Corporation
- Type: Private
- Industry: Private equity
- Genre: Healthcare, aerospace, financial services
- Predecessor: Sovereign Global
- Founded: 2006; 20 years ago in Singapore
- Founder: Richard Chandler
- Headquarters: Singapore, Singapore
- Number of locations: Singapore, Dubai
- Areas served: International
- Key people: Richard Chandler (chairman), Russell Low (president), Wayne Wilkinson (CFO)
- Divisions: Clermont Capital
- Subsidiaries: magniX, SBFC, Hoan My Medical Corporation
- Website: www.clermont.com/home

The Clermont Group is a Singapore-based conglomerate that includes both operational businesses and financial investments. Founded by Richard Chandler in 2006, the company has an investment division, Clermont Capital, and a portfolio in healthcare, aerospace, financial services, and technology. Primary subsidiaries include Hoan My Medical Corporation of Vietnam, SBFC of India, and magniX.

== History ==
=== 2006-2012 ===
The Clermont Group was established in December 2006 by Richard Chandler, a businessman from New Zealand. The company was originally named Orient Global, with headquarters in Singapore and additional offices in London and Dubai. The founding of Orient Global followed the demerger of the (US$6 billion NAV) investment portfolio Chandler held with his brother, Christopher, which had operated as Sovereign Global since 1986. Notable for its corporate governance campaigns in Russia and South Korea, Sovereign Global had been among the first portfolio investors when Brazil and Russia opened to foreign investment in the 1990s. It had also invested in Japanese bank stocks in the early 2000s, and owned stakes in Indian businesses such as Housing Development Finance Corp, ICICI Bank and UTI Bank.

By 2007, Orient Global had established a US$100 million Education Fund, which operated Rumi Education out of Hyderabad. Orient Global began investing in healthcare in 2009, establishing Viva Healthcare as a subsidiary. Orient Global became the Richard Chandler Corporation in 2010. It founded Newtown International, an educational service, in Bangladesh in 2011. Also in 2011, the Richard Chandler Corporation invested in the Chinese timber company Sino-Forest, becoming its largest shareholder. Sino-Forest filed for bankruptcy the next year. In 2012, the Richard Chandler Corporation consolidated its four divisions, and spent $112 million acquiring a 13.4% stake in the Union Bank of Nigeria.

=== 2013-2016 ===
In 2013, the Richard Chandler Corporation became the Chandler Corporation. At the time, the Chandler Corporation was valued at an estimated $5 billion, with investments in areas such as financial services, energy, healthcare, and education. It had stakes in companies such as Citigroup, Bank of America, SK Corporation, ICICI Bank, State Bank of India, ING, BP, Cairn India, Unified Energy Systems, LG Group, Gazprom, Mizuho, and UFJ Holdings.

In 2013, the company's subsidiary Razi Healthcare was expanding in India, while its subsidiary Viva Healthcare had healthcare investments in the Philippines, Indonesia, Kenya, Egypt, Pakistan, and Vietnam. The company in 2013 acquired a significant minority investment in The Medical City, a chain of hospitals and clinics in the Philippines. Also in 2013, the Chandler Corporation bought an 80% stake in Hoan My Medical Corporation, the largest private hospital group in Vietnam. After the purchase, facilities were upgraded and expanded, new hospitals were acquired and integrated into the hospital group, and operating procedures in the network were standardized.

The company's 19.6% stake in InterOil Corporation, an energy company based in Canada, was valued at $639 million by 2014. Also in 2014, the company held a $366 million stake in Masan Group in Vietnam, a 9.9% stake in Africa Oil Corp valued at $220 million, a 13.4% stake in Union Bank of Nigeria, and stakes in Orka Energy, Energy World Corp., and Green Dragon Gas. That year, it sold Rumi Education to its management team. The Chandler Corporation was renamed the Clermont Group by 2016. That year, it invested in HaloDoc, a healthcare app in Indonesia.

=== 2017-2025 ===
The Clermont Group acquired magniX, which at the time was developing a battery-electric propulsion system for electric airplanes, in 2017. The company became a subsidiary, and was moved from Australia to Washington State shortly after the acquisition. Also in 2017, the Clermont Group invested in ICICI Lombard, and purchased 9% of Indiabulls Pharmaceuticals. At the time, the Clermont Group had large minority stakes in Indiabulls Real Estate, Axis Bank, and Ujjivan Financial Services, as well as complete ownership of the investment company Tamarind Capital Pte.

In October 2017, Clermont Group took part in a funding round for OakNorth Bank, a UK bank founded in 2015 that lends to businesses and property developers. OakNorth also has a fintech platform that automates the credit analysis normally used for larger corporate loans. The funding round valued the bank in excess of $1 billion. In February 2019, Japan's SoftBank Vision Fund and the Clermont Group invested an additional $440 million in OakNorth Bank.

Clermont Group increased its stake in The Medical City to 54% in 2018, at which point The Medical City served 50,000 inpatients and 500,000 outpatients a year. The majority stake went to CVC Capital in 2023. In 2018, the Clermont Group opened a new office in Ho Chi Minh City. Chandler, still serving as chairman, met with the Deputy Prime Minister of Vietnam Vương Đình Huệ in December 2018 to discuss areas for cooperation in developing financial services businesses within the country. Clermont Group had previously done consulting work for the State Bank of Vietnam and other agencies in regard to fintech and digital banking, as well as restructuring domestic credit and financial institutions.

In February 2020, the Clermont Group increased its stake in NMC Health, a hospital operator in the UAE, from 2.7% to 3.18%. In 2021, magniX secured a $74 million, five-year contract from NASA to research electrified aircraft propulsion. In 2025, Richard Chandler remained the Clermont Group's chairman. Russell Low served as president, while Wayne Wilkinson served as CFO.

== Holdings and divisions ==
The Clermont Group builds operating businesses in healthcare, financial services and technology, and has both wholly owned subsidiaries and significant minority holdings. The company's businesses as of 2025 included Hoan My Medical Corporation, SBFC, magniX, and Clermont Capital.

=== Clermont Capital ===
Clermont Group's investment division, Clermont Capital allocates capital globally to investments in both public and private equities, including emerging markets.

=== SBFC ===
SBFC is a financial services company in India. Acquired by Clermont in 2017, it is focused on entrepreneurs and has 186 branches in 152 towns and cities. It listed on the National Stock Exchange of India and the Bombay Stock Exchange in 2023.

=== Hoàn Mỹ Medical Corporation ===
Acquired by Clermont in 2013, Hoàn Mỹ Medical Corporation is the largest private healthcare group in Vietnam, comprising 14 hospitals and seven clinics as of 2025. Hoàn Mỹ was awarded "Vietnam Hospital of the Year" by Frost & Sullivan in 2016 and 2017 and received "Third Class Labour Medal" from the President of Vietnam in 2017.

=== magniX ===
magniX, a Clermont Group subsidiary acquired in 2017, develops and manufactures power-dense, energy efficient electric motors for aircraft. Headquartered near Seattle, magniX has developed proprietary technology designed for light aircraft, and is working towards the goal of all-electric aircraft, including powertrains for electric, hybrid electric and hydrogen electric aircraft.
