= Siemens SP90G =

German electric aircraft motor

SP90G
- Type: Electric aircraft engine
- National origin: Germany
- Manufacturer: Siemens

The Siemens SP90G is a German electric motor for powering electric aircraft, designed and produced by Siemens of Erlangen.

== Design and development ==
The SP90G is a brushless design producing 65 kW (87 hp), with an outrunner coil. The design uses a planetary gear mechanical gearbox reduction drive.

== Specifications (SP90G) ==
Data from Tacke

=== General characteristics ===
- Type: Brushless electric aircraft engine
- Length: 180 mm (7.1 in)
- Diameter: 224 mm (8.8 in)
- Dry weight: 13 kg (28.7 lb)

=== Components ===
- Coil type: Outrunner
- Cooling system: air
- Reduction gear: planetary gear mechanical gearbox

=== Performance ===
- Power output: 65 kW (87 hp)
- Voltage: V nominal
- Power-to-weight ratio: 5.0 kW/kg

== See also ==
- Siemens SP260D

Related lists

- List of aircraft engines
