= Lectromec =

Aircraft wiring company

Lectromec Design Co. is a Dulles, Virginia-based engineering firm specializing in aircraft electrical wiring interconnection system certification and testing. Lectromec's ISO 17025 accredited laboratory is equipped to test and analyze electrical systems of various types for a variety of industries. Lectromec's research focuses on understanding the electrical and physical properties of wiring insulation and the ill effects of damaged wiring.

== History ==
Lectromec was founded in 1984 by Dr. Armin Bruning and initially worked with the United States Navy to evaluate problems with the wiring on several of its aircraft. As the company has grown, Lectromec has worked with a diverse host of customers including foreign and domestic militaries, private sector businesses, wire manufacturers, and government agencies. As the aging wire issue became more visible and increasingly critical, Lectromec has responded by offering solutions to help minimize wiring-related problems.

Personnel from Lectromec were among the experts that were called before the United States Congress to testify about the fatal accident involving TWA 800 and brought to the attention of the representatives how damaging flawed wire on aircraft could be.

Lectromec has consulted and tested wiring for the aerospace industry for over 30 years. Currently, Lectromec employs a diverse staff trained to perform tasks such as wire testing, evaluation, and risk assessment. Lectromec owns several wire related patents, and works on developing wire maintenance technology in the fields of Electrical Wire Interconnection Systems (EWIS) on aircraft.
