= Desaer ATL-100 =

Utility aircraft under development by Desaer

General information
- Type: Utility aircraft
- National origin: Brazil
- Manufacturer: Desaer
- Status: Under development

History
- Introduction date: 2023

The Desaer ATL-100 (ATL being Portuguese for "light transport aircraft") is a twin-turboprop, high-wing, utility aircraft under development by Desaer in Brazil.

== Development ==
Desaer, a Brazilian aviation firm, launched the ATL 100 project in October 2018. It was registered in Brazil as a Strategic Defense Product. In 2020, Desaer announced a joint venture with CEIIA in Portugal to manufacture the turboprop. By 25 September 2020, a joint-venture between Brazilian Desaer and Portuguese engineering centre CEiiA was expected to create 1,200 jobs at a new integrated factory in Evora. The ATL-100 was to be developed over three years. The partnership with CEIIA was dissolved in 2021, with a clause forbidding CEIIA from launching a similar product until 2025.

By 2022, Desaer planned to start flying its ATL-100 prototype in 2023. In 2022, Desaer tapped MagniX to provide engines for its ATL-100H aircraft, a planned hybrid-electric version of its ATL-100 aircraft.

In early 2025, the ATL 100 was still under development, with an expected range of 1,600 km powered by two Pratt & Whitney PT-6 engines. In February 2025, Desaer accused EA Aircraft and Maintenance of appropriating technical information from the ATL 100 model for its LUS 222 aircraft.

== Design ==
The ATL-100 is a non-pressurized, twin-turboprop, high-wing utility aircraft with a fixed tricycle landing gear and an aft cargo ramp. With an MTOW up to 19,000 lb (8.6 t), it should be certified under the part 23 commuter category for 19 passengers or three LD3 containers. It could operate on unpaved and short runways, with little or no ground support; it targets robustness and easy maintenance, and low operations costs. Quick-change variants could be offered for air ambulance, emergency evacuation, paratrooper or troop transport; and for patrol, surveillance, intelligence, reconnaissance.

=== ATL-100H ===
The ATL-100H is a variant of the original that adds two outboard magniX magni350 electric motors to the configuration. Their role is to provide additional thrust, primarily for take-off and climbing. Each 111.5-kg (246-lb) motor offers 350-kW/1,610 Nm (1,188 ft lb) of maximum continuous torque. The company claimed that it would reduce fuel consumption by 25-40% and reduce take-off noise levels.

== Specifications ==
Data from Desaer

General characteristics

- Capacity: 2.5 t (5,500 lb) payload / 19 passengers / 3×LD3s
- Length: 16 m (52 ft 6 in)
- Wingspan: 20 m (65 ft 7 in)
- Height: 6 m (19 ft 8 in)
- Max takeoff weight: 8,618 kg (19,000 lb)
- Powerplant: 2 × turboprop , 750 kW (1,000 hp) each
- Propellers: 5-bladed

Performance

- Maximum speed: 428 km/h (266 mph, 231 kn) LRC
- Cruise speed: 380 km/h (236 mph, 205 kn) maximum range
- Range: 1,398 km (869 mi, 755 nmi) Maximum payload
- Ferry range: 3,700 km (2,300 mi, 2,000 nmi) Max Fuel/LRC/10000ft/ISA
- Service ceiling: 7,620 m (25,000 ft)

== See also ==
Aircraft of comparable role, configuration, and era

- LUS-222
- CASA C212
- Cessna 408 SkyCourier
- Dornier 228
- Harbin Y-12
- Indonesian Aerospace N-219
- Let L-410
- PZL M28 Skytruck
- Viking DHC-6-400 Twin Otter
