= Eviation Alice =

Project of electric aircraft

Alice
- 2024 configuration with constant cross-section tubular fuselage, large winglets, higher propeller pylons, and a larger central energy storage compartment above the wing

General information
- Type: Electric aircraft
- National origin: Israel
- Manufacturer: Eviation Aircraft
- Status: On hold

History
- Introduction date: Planned 2027
- First flight: 27 September 2022

The Eviation Alice is an electric aircraft designed to accommodate nine passengers and two crew members. First developed in Israel, its construction incorporates 95% composite material, is powered by two electric motors, and has a T-tail. The prototype first flew on 27 September 2022. As of 2025, the company and aircraft have been put on an indefinite pause.

== Development ==
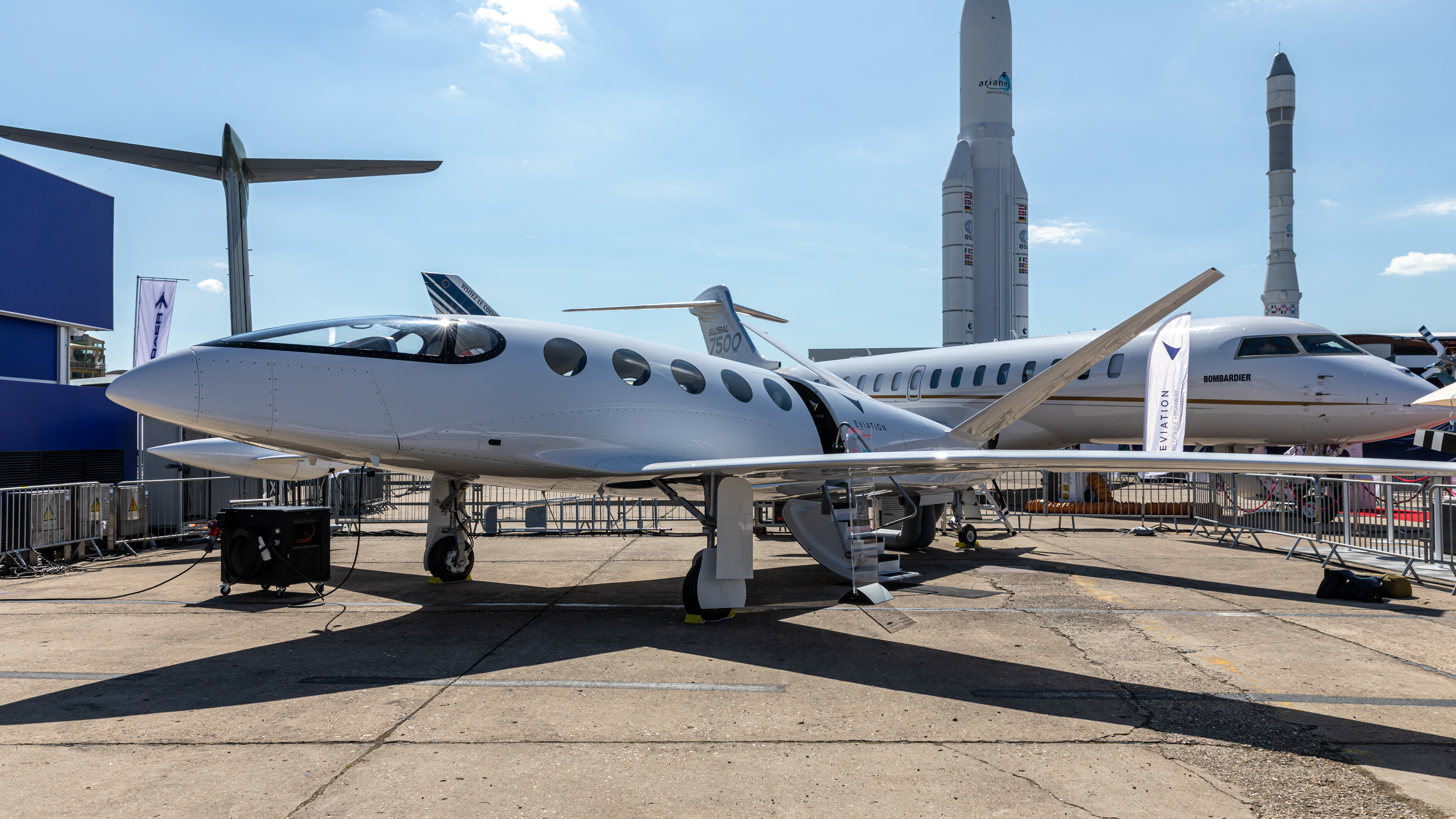
The prototype at the June 2019 Paris Air Show featured a single pusher propeller and twin wingtip motors, a V-tail, and a taildragger landing gear

Eviation was founded in 2015 by Omer Bar-Yohay, Omri Regev and Aviv Tzidon. Risk-sharing partnerships have enabled work to go ahead.

In February 2018, a 650 lb (290 kg) scale model UAV was flown to validate the aerodynamics and flight controls. Kokam was selected to supply pouch lithium polymer batteries to power the full-scale prototype. Work on the power system and drive train was begun.

Eviation teamed up with Embry-Riddle Aeronautical University to launch a research and development program in the spring of 2019 at its Prescott, Arizona campus. The program would focus on performance analysis, validation and testing, along with preliminary design and sub-scale testing of future electric propulsion and airframe design concepts.

By early 2019, Eviation had secured $200 million of investment to cover certification and production while the first prototype was assembled in Vannes, northwest France. In April 2019, Eviation selected magniX magni250 375 shp (280 kW) electric motors turning at 1,900 rpm as an alternative power option to Siemens 260 kW motors.

At the June 2019 Paris Air Show, a full-size static Alice was exhibited.

The first airline customer was announced: Hyannis, Massachusetts-based Cape Air. Cape Air ordered 92 aircraft, priced at $4 million each. magniX investor Clermont Group from Singapore took a 70% stake in Eviation Aircraft in August 2019. By October 2019, over 150 Alice aircraft had been ordered by two American companies. Many orders are backed by firm but refundable down payments. Further investment of $500 million was still needed to begin serial production.

On 22 January 2020, a fire broke out and the prototype was destroyed, but no-one was injured. The fire broke out in an under-floor battery compartment located in the "operator/passenger area".

On 18 May 2020, GKN Aerospace announced their partnership with Eviation on the design and manufacture of the wing, empennage and electrical wiring interconnection system of subsequent Alice airframes.

=== 2021 redesign ===
The configuration unveiled in July 2021 features twin aft-mounted motors, a T-tail and a tricycle landing gear.

By December 2020, Eviation expected to fly a modified Alice design in 2021, with the wing-tip motors relocated, before certification in the second half of 2023.

In July 2021, Eviation unveiled the updated configuration with a T-tail and two 850 hp (634 kW) magni650 electric powerplants on each side of the aft fuselage, aiming for a first flight the same year. It should cruise at 220 kn (407 km/h, down from 240 kn), have 440 nmi range, 100 nmi (185 km) less than previously, be powered by an 820 kWh lithium-ion battery weighing 3,720 kg (8,200 lb), down from a 920 kWh battery weighing 3,600 kg, would have a 6,350 kg maximum take-off weight, down from 6,668 kg, an altitude ceiling of 32,000 ft and a maximum payload of 1,134 kg.

Taxi testing of the first production model began in December 2021 at Arlington Municipal Airport, north of Seattle. In June 2022, it was announced that the prototype Alice was being moved to Grant County International Airport in Moses Lake, Washington, where first flight was hoped to occur by the summer of 2022.

The aircraft had its first flight on 27 September 2022. Following the first test flight, Eviation announced it has revised the proposed range from 440 nm to 250 nm. The projected service entry date has been delayed to 2027. Before this range reduction, endurance at MTOW was planned at 2.8h.

=== 2024 redesign ===
As no other flights followed the eight-minute September 2022 sortie, in April 2024 Eviation updated the Alice configuration to a constant cross-section tubular fuselage, large winglets, higher propeller pylons, and a larger central energy storage compartment above the wing following the completion of a conceptual design review alongside TLG Aerospace.

=== 2025 company leadership issues ===
In February 2025, the company announced it would lay off most of its staff among struggles between the company's cofounders and the majority owner of the company, Singapore-based Clermont group. The future viability of the company or the project are unknown, as both have been suspended for an indefinite time.

== Design ==
Two variants of the Alice were originally planned. The initial, unpressurized model was intended for air taxi operations, with energy stored in a lithium-ion battery. Eviation was working on building a prototype scheduled to fly in early 2019. In 2017, a second pressurized model was to be an extended-range ER executive aircraft available by 2023 for $2.9 million, with a more powerful aluminum-air battery with a lithium-polymer buffer, a cabin pressurized to 1,200 m (4,000 ft) at FL 280, G5000 avionics, a 444 km/h (240 kn) cruise and 1,367 km (738 nmi) range. In October 2019, Eviation described only the pressurized Alice Commuter with a 260 kn (480 km/h) cruise speed.

With 260 Wh/kg cells, the 900 kWh battery capacity (3,460 kg, 7,630 lb) is initially estimated to give the design a range of 540–650 nmi (1,000–1,200 km) at 240 knots and 10,000 ft (3,048 m). This is anticipated to increase as battery technology improves. The batteries have been tested to more than 1,000 cycles, equivalent to 3,000 flight hours, They will then require replacement at a cost of $250,000, which is half of the direct operating cost and similar to a piston engine overhaul. Based on U.S. industrial electricity prices, the direct operating cost with nine passengers and two crew, flying at 240 kn (440 km/h), is claimed to be $200 per hour, which compares to $600–1,000 per hour for existing aircraft of similar purchase price such as the Cessna 402s, Pilatus PC-12 and Beechcraft King Air, for operations on routes under 500 nmi (930 km). 45% of air routes fall within its 565 nmi (1,050 km) range at 260 kn (482 km/h), or 55% of airline flights according to Flightglobal's Cirium data.

The electric drivetrain will have a higher voltage than current electrical systems. Two 850 hp (630 kW) magni650 electric motors will drive two propellers mounted on the aft fuselage. The unpressurized aircraft has a flat lower fuselage. The Italian company Magnaghi Aeronautica supplies landing gear and has already produced the gear for the similarly sized Piaggio P.180 Avanti. It will be built with existing technology, including a composite airframe, propulsion from two magniX electric engines and Honeywell's flight control systems, including automatic landing. At 3,700 kg (8,200 lb), the batteries account for 60% of the aircraft take-off weight. Manufacturing is planned in the US.

The company plans for recharging to be carried out by mobile charging vehicles, similar to aviation fuel trucks. Each hour of flight time is expected to require a charging time of 30 minutes. The cells are similar to those from auto industry batteries.

== Orders ==
In 2024, Eviation disclosed it has secured more than 600 letters of intent (LOIs) for aircraft worth an estimated $5 billion, with some of those deals included deposits, the company hopes to begin converting LOIs into firm orders once it has finalised suppliers for the aircraft.

The first potential customers for the Alice was Cape Air, a regional airline serving the Northeastern United States as well as the Caribbean. In August 2021, Deutsche Post announced that it had ordered 12 aircraft for use by DHL to transport cargo, with delivery planned from 2024. In April 2022, Eviation stated that Cape Air signed a letter of Intent for the purchase of 75 planes. In September 2022, GlobalX Airlines signed a letter of intent for an order of 50 aircraft, with deliveries starting in 2027. In January 2023, Mexican regional carrier Aerus ordered 30 aircraft.

== Specifications (intended) ==
Data from Eviation

General characteristics

- Crew: 2
- Capacity: 9 passengers
- Length: 17.4 m (57 ft 1 in)
- Wingspan: 19.2 m (63 ft 0 in)
- Height: 3.84 m (12 ft 7 in)
- Max takeoff weight: 8,346 kg (18,400 lb)
- Commuter payload: 1,134 kg (2,500 lb)
- Cargo payload: 1,179 kg (2,600 lb)
- Powerplant: 2 × magniX magni650 electric propulsion unit , 700 kW (940 hp) each

Performance

- Maximum speed: 480 km/h (300 mph, 260 kn)
- Range: 460 km (290 mi, 250 nmi) VFR, 30 min. reserve, LRC, MTOW
- Take-off field Length: 840 m (2,750 ft)
- Landing distance: 620 m (2,040 ft)

== See also ==
- List of electric aircraft
- Tecnam P-Volt – Suspended Italian electric aircraft project
- Zunum Aero – Aircraft manufacturer
