= Electrical wiring interconnection system =

Wiring system and components in a complex system such as an aircraft

An electrical wiring interconnect system (EWIS) is the wiring system and components (such as bundle clamps, wire splices, etc.) for a complex system. The term originated in the aviation industry but was originally designated as Electrical Interconnection Systems (EIS). The change from EIS to EWIS was done to emphasize the focus on the actual wires and wiring of the systems throughout aircraft.

== Background ==
Prior to the aviation accidents of TWA Flight 800 and SwissAir 111, the wiring on aircraft was a minor concern. In response to these accidents, the Aging Transport Systems Rulemaking Advisory Committee (ATSRAC) was chartered to gather industry leaders examine the current state of aging aircraft systems; one of the main areas examined included EWIS. The committee included a number of key organizations and businesses including ATA, NASA, Northwest Airlines, Boeing, Airbus, FAA, and Electromechanical Design Company. Many of the results from the ATSRAC committee shaped the FAA's regulatory reaction to the handling and certification of EWIS. The following is an excerpt from the FAA’s regulations released November 8, 2007 governing aspects of EWIS on aircraft as to the reason for the increased concerns regarding EWIS:

“Safety concerns about wiring systems in airplanes were brought to the forefront of public attention by a midair explosion in 1996 involving a 747 airplane. Ignition of flammable vapors in the fuel tank was the probable cause of that fatal accident, and the most likely source was a wiring failure that allowed a spark to enter the fuel tank. All 230 people aboard the airplane were killed. Two years later, an MD–11 (Swissair Flight 111) airplane crashed into the Atlantic Ocean, killing all 229 people aboard. Although an exact cause could not be determined, the presence of re-solidified copper on a portion of a wire of the in-flight entertainment system cable indicated that wire arcing had occurred in the area where the fire most likely originated.

Investigations of those accidents and later examinations of other airplanes showed a collection of common problems. Deteriorated wiring, corrosion, improper wire installation and repairs, and contamination of wire bundles with metal shavings, dust, and fluids (which would provide fuel for fire) were common conditions in representative examples of the ‘‘aging fleet of transport airplanes.’’ "

The FAA funded a number of studies involving the analysis of the current state of wiring on aircraft, the deterioration processes of wiring systems, tools to detect wire failure, and ways of quantifying and mitigating the damage from an electrical arc.

In 2009 the European Aviation Safety Agency issued 3 "Acceptable Means of Compliance", AMC 20-21, AMC 20-22 and AMC 20-23 dealing in turn with the maintenance procedures, the training and the documentation that had to be introduced by Maintenance and Repair Organisations to reduce the probability of serious incidents or accidents caused by wiring failure.

AMC 20-22 is almost exactly similar to the US FAA Airworthiness Circular 120-94.

== EWIS Aircraft Electrical Systems Reliability ==
The term electrical system refers to those parts on the aircraft that generate, distribute and use electrical energy, including their supports and attachments. The satisfactory performance of an aircraft is dependent upon the continued reliability of the electrical system. Reliability of the electrical system is proportional to the quality of maintenance received, the correct independent part selection and the supervised installation of each electrical component in the aircraft as explained in the FAA advisory circular 43.13-1B - Acceptable Methods, Techniques, and Practices Chapter 11.

Electrical component selection is a critical step to ensure the correct operation in any aircraft electrical system. Components need to be selected for their electrical specifications and properties as well as for the extreme conditions these components could be exposed. Inspection and testing of every single component plays a major role in the EWIS regulations to guarantee the safety and reliability of the system.

Correct engineering design, planning and coordination with the manufacturers of each electrical component will secure the proper installation of each component. The correct installation of the components in the aircraft and the manufacturing procedures are requirements of the EWIS regulations.

Once the aircraft has an airworthiness certificate and has reached an entry into service status, the maintenance of the aircraft’s electrical systems will play a key role to guarantee the reliability of the systems and the safety of flight.

== See also ==
- Lectromec
