= NASA Electric Aircraft Testbed =

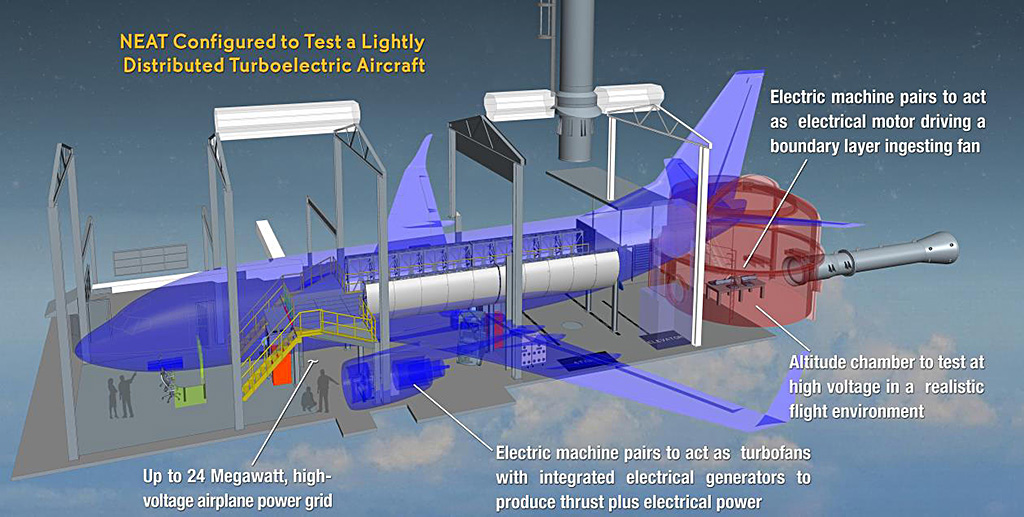
NASA Electric Aircraft Testbed

The NASA Electric Aircraft Testbed (NEAT) is a NASA reconfigurable testbed in Plum Brook Station, Ohio, used to design, develop, assemble and test electric aircraft power systems, from a small, one or two person aircraft up to 20 MW (27,000 hp) airliners. NASA research agreements (NRA) are granted to develop electric-propulsion components. They will be completed in 2019 and the internal NASA work by 2020, then they will be assembled in a megawatt-scale drive system to be tested in the narrowbody-sized NEAT.

== Machines ==
The University of Illinois is developing a 1-megawatt permanent magnet synchronous motor spinning at 18,000 rpm to drive a Rolls-Royce LibertyWorks' Electrically Variable Engine turbofan from a battery for taxiing, takeoff and idle descent in a parallel hybrid. Ohio State University is building 300-kW and 1-megawatt prototype motors, a 2,700 rpm, 1-m (3.3-ft) diameter, 2.7-megawatt liquid cooled ring induction motor and designed a 5,000 rpm, 10-megawatt turbofan integrated ring motor. These electric machines target 13 kW/kg and over 93% efficiency, while NASA Glenn Research Center is developing a superconducting electric machine with a 16 kW/kg goal and above 98% efficiency: a 0.4-m-dia, 6,800 rpm, 1.4-megawatt wound-field synchronous motor using a self-cooled, high-temperature superconducting rotor winding.

== Voltage ==
The highest voltage used now is 540 (±270) volts, but distributing megawatt-scale power will require higher voltage to reduce current for smaller, lighter electric cables. One megawatt over 150 ft (46 m) need 900 kg at 540 V but would be reduced to 200 kg at 2,000 V DC. A near-term hybrid would need 1,000–3,000-volt and a fully turboelectric large aircraft 5,000–10,000-volt, like ship power systems but arcing occurs at much lower voltages at low pressures than at sea level.

== Inverters ==
While a battery power source would use a direct current distribution, a gas turbine power source would also allow alternating current which would need power converters, mainly inverters to convert DC to controlled, variable-frequency AC to regulate a motor speed and torque. Silicon carbide [SiC] and gallium nitride [GaN] switches can operate at higher frequencies with lower losses, increasing efficiency. GE is building a 2,400-volt DC, 1-megawatt inverter with SiC switches and its 1.7-kW MOSFETs power modules. The University of Illinois is building a 1,000 volts DC, 200-kW "flying capacitor" scalable to a 1-megawatt with GaN-based field-effect transistor switches. Both are liquid cooled and target 19 kW/kg at 99% efficiency, but Boeing is developing a cryogenically cooled 1-megawatt inverter for 26 kW/kg and 99.3% efficiency with off-the-shelf silicon semiconductors, and is currently fabricating a liquid-nitrogen-cooled 200-kW inverter before a 1-megawatt one.
