= Solair =

Type of aircraft

Solair I and Solair II are two German-designed electric aircraft.

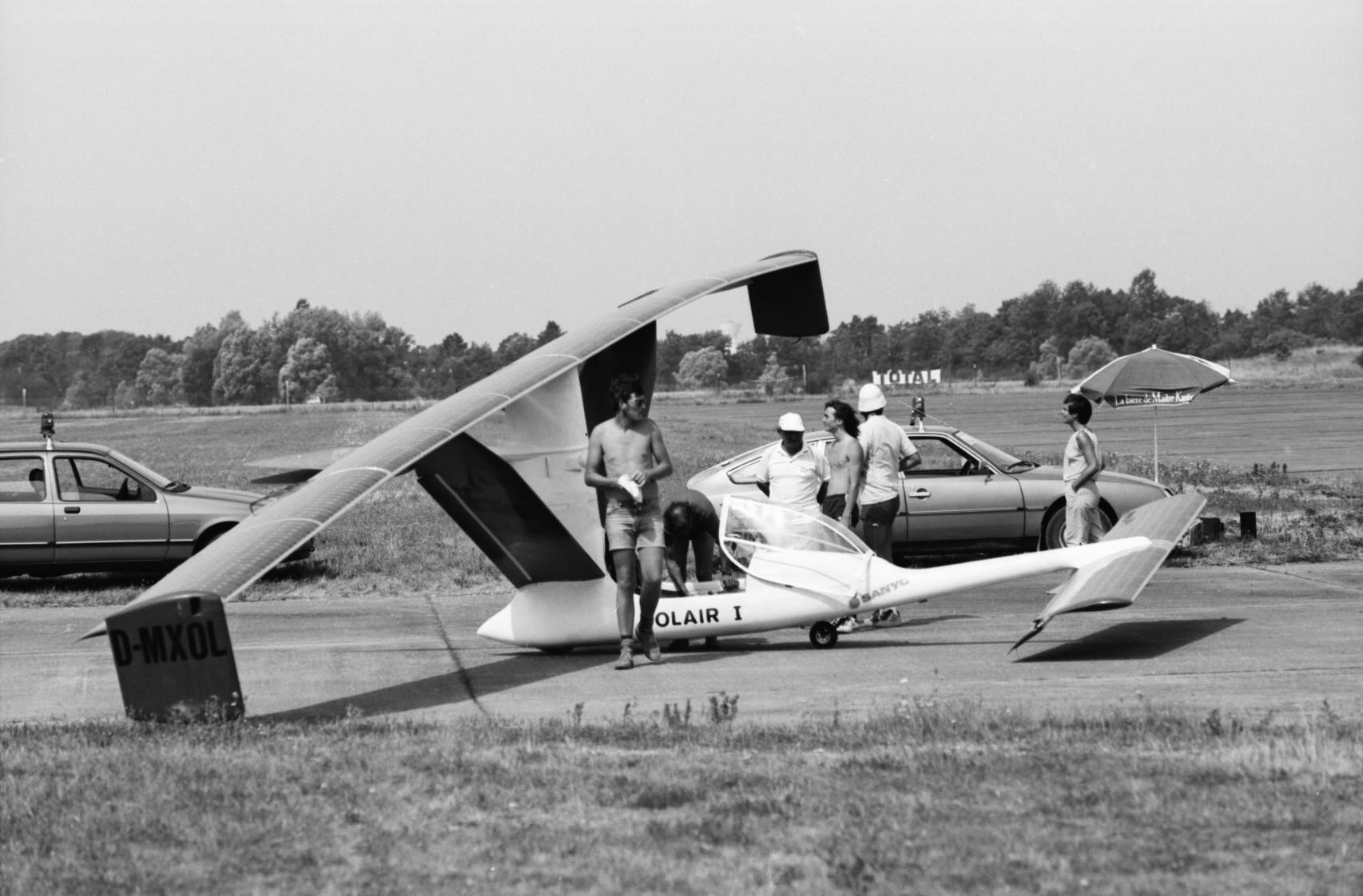
Solair I

== Solair 1 ==
The human piloted Solair I was developed from 1980 by Günther Rochelt - developer of the Musculair human-powered aircraft series - based on a Hans Farner canard design. It employed 2499 wing-mounted solar cells giving an output of between 1.8 kilowatts (kW), equivalent to approximately 2.4 horsepower (hp), and 2.2 kW (3.0 hp). The aircraft first flew at Unterwössen, Germany on 21 August 1983. It flew for 5 hours and 41 minutes, "mostly on solar energy and also thermals". The aircraft is now displayed at the German Museum in Munich. The newly developed piloted Solair II made its first flight in May 1998 and further test flights that summer but the propulsion system overheated too fast. Development stopped when Günther Rochelt suddenly died in September 1998.

== Solair II ==
The Solair II project began in 1996, and aimed to develop a higher-powered successor aircraft. Modelled on glider construction, the aircraft has a V-tail tail, and fin headed on each propeller for propulsion. The aircraft was manufactured in half-shells sandwich construction with honeycomb cores. With charged batteries, it required an input of 755 W power for the straight flight.

- Wingspan: 20.00 m, wing area: 17.00 m^{2}, fuselage length: 6.12 m
- Empty weight: 140 kg
- Maximum take off weight (MTOW): 230 kg
- Solar generator
  - Solar cells: 13,44 m^{2} Mono-crystalline silicon cells
  - Max efficiency: 17.3%
  - Max power (radiation 500 W / m^{2}): 1163 W
- Drive
  - 2 x permanent magnet DC motor with pusher propeller (1.46 m diameter) in the tail
  - Nominal voltage: 30 V each (motors in series connected)
  - Max power: 2 × 4500 W
  - Used 2 × 4 kW motors with 2-sheet folding propellers (2 m diameter) with pitch after a modification
- Batteries
  - Battery type: 54 cells in series 2-4 of battery packs parallel, voltage: 65 V
  - Capacity: Max 4 × 5.2 AH 20.8 = Ah, storable energy: Max 1352 WH

== See also ==
- Musculair
