= MagniX =

Electric aircraft engine manufacturer

magniX
- Type: Subsidiary
- Industry: Aerospace manufacturer
- Founded: 2005 in Queensland, Australia
- Headquarters: Everett, Washington, U.S.
- Products: Electric propulsion systems for aircraft
- Owner: Clermont Group
- Website: www.magnix.aero

magniX (/ˌmæɡniˈɛks/ MAG-nee-EX) is an electric motor and battery manufacturer wholly owned by Singapore investor Clermont Group. With products for use in aerospace and defense, the company is headquartered in Everett, Washington, United States, where it has a 40,000 square foot facility for R&D and manufacturing. The company's electric propulsion systems have been used in test flights for several aircraft, including a DHC-2 Beaver seaplane, the Eviation Alice, a de Havilland Dash 8 using a hydrogen fuel cell, a Robinson R44 helicopter, and a Cessna 208B Grand Caravan, among others.

== History ==
=== 2005-2018: Early years ===
The company was established in 2005 in Australia by Tony Guina, an inventor and entrepreneur. Originally named Guina Energy, it was founded as a research and development firm focused on electric motors. In 2016 it became a fully owned subsidiary of the Clermont Group.

In 2017, the company was rebranded as magniX. magniX's original prototype electric motor, the magni5, was first successfully tested in 2017. By 2018, it could produce 265–300 kW (355–402 hp) peak at 2,500 rpm at 95% efficiency with a 53 kg (117 lb) dry mass motor, having a 5 kW/kg (2.3 kW/lb) power density. The magni5 competed with the 260 kW (350 hp), 50 kg (110 lb) Siemens SP260D for the Extra 330LE. In 2018, magniX moved its headquarters from Australia to the United States, establishing an engineering facility in Redmond, Washington.

=== 2018-2019: Early flight tests ===
In September 2018, a 260 kW (350 hp) electric motor with a propeller was tested on a Cessna iron bird. magniX outlined plans to fly an electric Cessna 208 Caravan with a magniX motor. Development for the test aircraft, dubbed the eCaravan, was carried out in Queensland in Australia and Washington state in the US.

In April 2019, magniX was selected as the propulsion system provider for the Eviation Alice, a nine-seat all electric airplane. By this time, magniX had accumulated over 1,500 hours of ground tests in Redmond and Australia.

In 2019, Harbour Air, a seaplane company based in Vancouver, Canada, partnered with magniX on converting a DHC-2 Beaver to electric power, with the end goal of electrifying its entire fleet. The "eBeaver" completed its first test flight on December 10, 2019, making a five-minute flight with the magni500 electric motor using lithium-ion batteries. This was hailed in the press as the first flight of an all-electric commercial aircraft.

=== 2020-2021: Cessna flight and NASA ===
The first flight of a modified Cessna 208B Grand Caravan with magniX motors was completed at Grant County International Airport on May 28, 2020. In the first flight of the world's largest all-electric aircraft, the magni500-powered variant could fly 160 km (100 mi) with 4-5 passengers while keeping reserve power. In December 2020, CEO was Roei Ganzarski.

In January 2021, magniX consolidated its Redmond headquarters and research center in Australia with one new facility. A 44,000 square-foot building near Paine Field in Everett began serving as its headquarters and facility for design, engineering and manufacturing. Also in 2021, the Federal Aviation Administration (FAA) issued magniX special conditions for electric engine airworthiness, allowing its EPUs to undergo FAA testing protocols. That year, magniX signed a deal with Tier 1 Engineering to supply EPUs for medical helicopters.

NASA awarded magniX a US$74.3 million contract in 2021 under its Electrified Powertrain Flight Demonstration program to research electrified aircraft propulsion. The program focused on electrifying a De Havilland Dash 7. magniX later conducted simulated altitude testing at the NASA Electric Aircraft Testbed facility in Ohio in April 2024.

=== 2022-2026: Further flights ===
In 2021, magniX released two new EPUs (electric propulsion units), the magni350 and magni650. The EPUs were named among the Best Inventions of 2022 by TIME. Two magniX EPUs were used to power the September 2022 initial test flight of the Eviation Alice. magniX motors were also tested in a helicopter for the first time in 2022. That June, a Robinson R44 with a magniX EPU completed a three-minute flight at Los Alamitos Army Airfield.

In 2024 and 2025, magniX introduced new products. In early 2024, magniX launched its Samson batteries with 300 Wh/kg. This was increased to 400 Wh/kg at the cell level in June 2025. magniX powered the first flight of a hydrogen-electric R44 in March 2025, in what was also the world's first piloted flight by a hydrogen-electric helicopter. magniX launched its HeliStorm engines for helicopters and rotorcraft in March 2025. At EAA AirVenture Oshkosh in July 2025, magniX and Robinson Helicopters announced an agreement to jointly develop a battery-electric powertrain for the R66 helicopter. In November 2025, Samson batteries were chosen by Bye Aerospace to power its eFlyer 2 training aircraft. At the Sun ‘n Fun Aerospace Expo in April 2026, the company launched the magniAIR engine for general aviation.

== Products ==
- magni350 - electric engine for fixed-wing (eCTOL) aircraft
- magni650 - electric engine for fixed-wing (eCTOL) aircraft
- HeliStorm - electric engine for helicopters and hybrids
- magniAIR – electric engine for general aviation.
- magniDrive - power electronics
- PDX800 - power distribution unit
- Samson300 - modular battery

== Customers and partners ==
Company	Product	Airplane/Helicopter(s)	Notes
Harbour Air	magni650	de Havilland Canada DHC-2 Beaver	First flight: 2019 (with a magni500)
Tier 1 Engineering	magni350	Robinson R44	First flight: 2022
Eviation Aircraft	magni650	Eviation Alice	First flight: September 27, 2022
Universal Hydrogen	magni650	Dash 8	First flight: March 2, 2023
NASA	magni650	Dash 7	
Blade Urban	TBA	Cessna 208 Caravan	
Flapper Tecnologia	magni650	Cessna 208 Caravan	
Desaer & CEiiA	magni350	Desaer ATL-100H	
Robinson Helicopters	HeliStorm	Robinson R66	
AeroTec	magni500	Cessna 208B Grand Caravan	First Flight: 2020
Unither Biolectronique	magni350	Robinson R44 (hydrogen-electric)	First Flight: March 2025
Bye Aerospace	Samson batteries	eFlyer 2	

== See also ==
- List of aircraft engines
