= Siemens SP260D =

German electric aircraft motor

SP260D
- Type: Electric aircraft engine
- National origin: Germany
- Manufacturer: Siemens

The Siemens SP260D is a German electric motor for powering electric aircraft, designed and produced by Siemens of Erlangen.

== Design and development ==
The SP260D is a brushless design producing 261 kW (350 hp), with an inrunner coil. It has a 95% efficiency. The low working rpm of the engine means that it can turn a propeller at efficient speeds without the need for a reduction drive.

== Specifications (SP260D) ==
Data from Tacke

=== General characteristics ===
- Type: Brushless electric aircraft engine
- Length: 300 mm (11.8 in)
- Diameter: 418 mm (16.5 in)
- Dry weight: 50 kg (110.2 lb)

=== Components ===
- Coil type: inrunner
- Cooling system: air
- Reduction gear: none

=== Performance ===
- Power output: 261 kW (350 hp)
- Voltage: V nominal
- Best efficiency: 95
- Power-to-weight ratio: 5.22 kW/kg

== See also ==
- MagniX
- Siemens SP90G

Related lists

- List of aircraft engines
