= Zunum Aero =

Aircraft manufacturer

- Zunum Aero promotional artwork
- Industry: Aerospace
- Founded: 2013
- Defunct: 2019
- Headquarters: Bothell, Washington, U.S.
- Key people: Ashish Kumar, CEO; Matt Knapp, CTO
- Products: Electric aircraft
- Number of employees: 70 (Oct 2018)
- Website: zunum.aero

Zunum Aero (Mayan for hummingbird) was an aircraft manufacturer startup based in Kirkland, Washington. Backed by Boeing HorizonX and JetBlue Technology Ventures, the company worked from 2013 to 2018 on a proposed family of hybrid electric regional aircraft of up to 50 seats.

== History ==
Zunum Aero was founded in 2013 with Ashish Kumar as CEO and Matt Knapp as CTO.

Around the beginning of 2017 they launched plans to fly a prototype hybrid-electric airliner in 2019 or 2020, under the revamped FAR Part 23 rules for electric aircraft standards expected by 2018 and with first type certification by 2020.

In April 2017, JetBlue Technology Ventures and Boeing HorizonX invested a combined $6.2 million in Series A funding. This was matched by an $800,000 research and development grant from Washington state’s Clean Energy Fund.

Beyond February 2018 Zunum needed $50 million in Series B funding and received bridging loans from JetBlue and Boeing in April, allowing hiring in the summer of 2018. However the company failed to attract additional investors.

Nearly all of the 70 staff were laid off in November 2018, bringing complaints of unpaid wages. Both the headquarters in Bothell near Seattle and facilities in Indianapolis closed. Zunum in November 2020 stated that their hardware and technical assets were their possession and in storage while they were fundraising.

In November 2020, Zunum Aero filed a lawsuit against Boeing alleging that Boeing tried “to gain access to proprietary information, intellectual property” and then used its dominance “to delay and then foreclose” Zunum's operation, “in order to maintain its dominant position in commercial aviation by stifling competition”, using this proprietary information “to provide a hybrid-electric propulsion system for a different aircraft design” with Safran. Zunum said that Boeing tried to poach Zunum's engineers.

Zunum won a $72 million jury verdict in May 2024 against Boeing. In August 2024, however, a federal judge threw out the verdict and entered judgment as a matter of law for Boeing.

== Six-to-12-seat ZA10 ==
Zunum small aircraft concept

=== Development ===
On 5 October 2017, Zunum Aero formally launched the development of a six-to-12-seat aircraft. Purchase cost was expected to stay below the list price of a $4.5 million single-engine turboprop such as the Pilatus PC-12 or Cessna Denali. Zunum targeted a $250 hourly operating cost including fuel, electricity, and batteries, or 8 cents per ASM. This would have been inferior to a Boeing 737 for 300–500 mi (480–800 km) sectors, comparable to a Q400 over 300–400 mi (480–640 km), and 3 to 5 times cheaper than a similarly sized PC-12 or Beechcraft King Air.

In May 2018, private jet charter JetSuite was announced as the launch customer for the proposed nine-passenger hybrid, for up to 100 aircraft. Zunum investor JetBlue Airways was also a strategic investor in JetSuite, led by founding JetBlue executive Alex Wilcox.

Ground tests of hybrid-electric power system subassemblies began in early 2018. In October 2018, Zunum selected Safran to supply a new 3Z variant of its 1,700-2,000 hp (1,270-1,500 kW) Ardiden turboshaft, delivering 500 kW with an electric generator. Turbogenerator and batteries were each designed to provide about half the power required initially, before batteries improved and could take over. The battery pack energy density would have been upgraded regularly, to increase planned range from 700 to 1,000 mi (1,100 to 1,600 km) between 2020 and 2030. The evolving batteries would have been certified every two years and introduced often, in line with their anticipated short cycle lives at high utilization rates.

=== Design ===
Design work focused on the power system. This would initially have been a series hybrid type with an onboard turbo-generator supplementing the batteries for longer flights.

A 1MW (1,350 hp) gas turbine would have driven twin 500 kW generators supplying batteries installed in the wings. These in turn would have driven ducted fans.

The rechargeable battery packs would have needed to be replaced every six months after 1,000-1,500 cycles. The hybrid generator would have been used initially to meet FAA reserves for a planned range of 700 nm (1,300 km). It would eventually have been replaced with a third battery pack giving a 45-minute reserve.

Airport turnarounds were hoped to be as short as 10 minutes for battery swaps or fast chargers.

When the company closed, Zunum had yet to decide the basic airframe configuration, sizing and materials.

== See also ==
- Electric aircraft

Aircraft of comparable role, configuration, and era

- Faradair Aerospace BEHA
- Beechcraft King Air
- Cessna Denali
- Pilatus PC-12
- Eviation Alice
