= Solar Impulse Foundation =

Environmental non-profit project

- Website type: Non-Profit
- Founded: 2003
- Headquarters: Lausanne, Vaud, Switzerland
- Founders: Bertrand Piccard; André Borschberg
- Industry: Cleantech
- Website: https://solarimpulse.com/

The Solar Impulse Foundation is an environmental non-profit project that is founded in 2003 by Bertrand Piccard and André Borschberg in collaboration with the Swiss Federal Institute of Technology in Lausanne.

The foundation is known for its round-the-world flight in an entirely solar powered plane completed in 2016, as well as the Solar Impulse Efficient Solution label awarded to 1000 solutions that are both profitable and good for the planet.

== History ==
=== The Solar Impulse Project ===
The founder of the Solar Impulse Foundation, Bertrand Piccard, credits the inspiration for the Solar Impulse project to a round-the-world-flight he completed in a hot air balloon in March 1999 with aeronaut Brian Jones, fueled by liquid propane.

When they landed with 40 kg remaining from 3.7 tons of propane, Piccard vowed to fly around the world again without the limitation of fuel.

The Solar Impulse Foundation was formed in 2003, and the first solar test flights were completed in 2009.

In 2015, Borschberg reported that the Solar Impulse project had cost 150 million Swiss francs or $160 million U.S. dollars.

=== Round-the-World in a Solar Plane ===
On March 9, 2015, the Solar Impulse 2, an entirely solar-powered flight piloted by Piccard and Borschberg, took off from Abu Dhabi, circumnavigating the globe in 505 days. During the flight, the Solar Impulse Foundation engaged with schools and young people, including video conferences with the pilots. The flight around the world in a solar-powered airplane was completed in 2016 and included an in-air interview with the eighth UN Secretary-General Ban Ki-Moon.

=== World Alliance for Clean Technologies ===
Piccard and the Solar Impulse Foundation announced the launch of the affiliated World Alliance for Clean Technologies network at the November 2016 United Nations Climate Change Conference in Marrakesh, Morocco. The goal of the World Alliance is to help push startups with economically viable green solutions into public awareness where their products can be noticed by investors, corporations, and government leaders looking for clean solutions. By mid-2019, the alliance had registered 1,850 member companies. In 2021, the Solar Impulse Foundation is launching a venture fund with BNP Paribas with a target size of 150 million euros and a growth and buyout platform (200 million euros) with Rothschild & Co and Air Liquide, with the aim of providing companies with capital to achieve the 1,000 solutions proclaimed by the Solar Impulse Foundation to protect the environment.

== Efficient Solution Label - 1000 Solutions ==
Piccard made the first public announcement of the Solar Impulse Foundation's intention to identify 1000 solutions to receive the Efficient Solutions Label at the 2016 U.N. Climate Change Conference. In February 2020, Piccard told GreenBiz that the solar-powered flight around the world was phase I, and in phase II, the Solar Impulse Foundation would certify and promote 1000 profitable technologies that decarbonize systems, cut energy use and clean up air and water.

In an interview in June 2018 with La Tribune, Piccard stated that solutions from all over the world can apply for the Efficient Solution Label. At that time Piccard said the Solar Impulse Foundation had received applications from 700 companies.

To apply for the Efficient Solution Label from the Solar Impulse Foundation, companies must be members of the World Alliance, which is free to join. They must also fill out an extensive application and go through an Ernst & Young-certified process where their solutions are vetted by members of the World Alliance to evaluate the potential for economic success and to estimate the length of the payback period for investors.

To qualify for the label, solutions must fit one of five sustainable development goals from the United Nations, specifically water, clean energy, industry, cities, and responsible consumption and production. They must also be available for purchase or ready for market.

In his January 2021 LCI interview, Piccard stated that 420 experts had approved and labeled 850 solutions, growing from 400 labeled solutions in October 2020 and from 287 a year earlier. Piccard stated in a Reuters interview that the foundation planned to reach 1000 labeled solutions in mid-April 2021. On April 13, 2021, the foundation announced that it had identified all 1000 solutions.

== Funding and Partnerships ==
The Solar Impulse Foundation receives financial support from its 16 corporate sponsors, which include Swiss food and drink company Nestlé, an organization that helped provide food for the two pilots on the round-the-world flight Solar Impulse 2; Air Liquide, Solvay, and others, as well as private donors.

The Solar Impulse Foundation funds the World Alliance for Efficient Solutions, whose annual operating budget was reported by GreenBiz in 2018 to be $2.9 million U.S. dollars per year. The World Alliance also collaborates with other global environmental organizations, including the World Economic Forum, IEA, IRENA, and others.

In May 2020, Piccard and the corporate partners of the Solar Impulse Foundation published a statement in the Financial Times calling on governments to prioritize the implementation of clean technologies in their global COVID-19 recovery efforts. This commitment was co-authored by 12 Solar Impulse Foundation business partners, including French utility Engie; European energy company Schneider Electric and nine more.

In December 2020, CNN reported that the Solar Impulse Foundation was supporting close to 400 companies with solutions that help the environment.

== See also ==
- Solar Impulse
- World Alliance for Clean Technologies
