= Bonardi =

Bonardi is an Italian surname. Notable people with the surname include:

- Jean-Philippe Bonardi (born 1970), French and Swiss Professor of Business Economics and Strategic Management
- Luigi Bonardi, known as Luigi Malerba (1927–2008), Italian author
- Natalina Bonardi (1864–1945) – Italian religious sister and superior
- Raymond-Gaspard de Bonardi de Saint-Sulpice (1761– 1835), French general
