= Joerg Dietz =

German academic

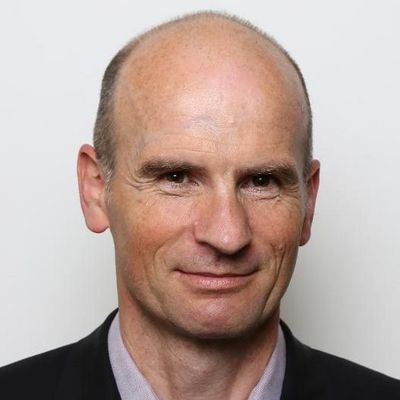
- Citizenship: German
- Education: Tulane University, Christian-Albrechts-Universität zu Kiel, Bankakademie Frankfurt
- Scientific career
- Fields: Organizational Behavior, Discrimination
- Workplaces: HEC Lausanne, Richard Ivey School of Business, University of Western Ontario
- Doctoral advisor: Arthur P. Brief
- Doctoral students: Thomas Fischer (academic)
- Website: Joerg Dietz at HEC Lausanne

Joerg Dietz is a German organizational behavior academic who is a professor in the Department of Organizational Behavior at HEC Lausanne. His research addressed leadership, contextual antecedents of organizational behavior, and diversity-related issues.

== Early life and education ==
Dietz received his Ph.D. in organizational behavior from Tulane University in 2000, where his dissertation examined organizational climate on employee well-being and organizational effectiveness.

== Academic career ==
Dietz began his career as an assistant professor at the Richard Ivey School of Business at the University of Western Ontario in 1999. He later became associate professor and held the Donald F. Hunter Professorship in International Business. In 2009, he joined HEC Lausanne as a full professor and was appointed head of the Department of Organizational Behavior. From 2012 to 2018 he served as Vice Dean of Faculty and Research, and then again as department head from 2018 to 2021. He has been a visiting scholar at the Sauder School of Business at the University of British Columbia and an adjunct professor a Geneva Graduate Institute.

== Research ==
Dietz's research addresses leadership, workplace diversity, and organizational behaviour, with a focus on improving causal inference. His leadership research has investigated leadership processes and leadership styles. The research has shown that leadership styles do not capture leader behaviors, but rather the evaluations of these behaviors by others. Dietz and his co-authors argue that therefore relationships between leadership styles and leadership outcomes do not capture effects of leader behaviors.

In the research on workforce diversity, co-authored research has studied antecedents of employment discrimination, including effects of authority instructions to prefer certain demographic groups as organizational factors, prejudice, and organizational commitment. This latter research showing that highly committed organizational members are particularly likely to conform to organizational pressures to prefer a certain demographic group, was a co-winner of the 2009 Saroj Parasuraman Award of the GDO Division of the Academy of Management.

Other publications have considered how organizational and community contexts are associated with workplace outcomes, including workplace aggression and perceptions of ethnic work conflict. Throughout his career, Dietz has also published on theory- and methods-related themes, including actionable theories, validity testing, and the use of ratio variables in correlational analyses.

== Awards and honors ==
- Best Paper Award at the Annual Conference of the Administrative Sciences Association of Canada in 2001.
- Co-winner of the Ivey Innovative Teaching Award in 2002 for the HBA program.
- The Outstanding Publication Award in Gender, Diversity, and Organization from the Academy of Management in 2008.
- The Richard Ivey School of Business's Fellowship in Teaching Innovation, awarded for outstanding teaching in 2008.
- Carolyn Dexter Award from the Academy of Management in 2010 for a paper on scientific mindfulness.
