= H55 =

Swiss aviation company

- Founded: 2017
- Founder: André Borschberg, Sébastien Demont, and Gregory Blatt.
- Headquarters: Sion, Switzerland
- Area served: Worldwide
- Key people: Aymeric Sallin, Martin Larose and Andy Sheehan.
- Products: Electric Propulsion System Battery System
- Website: https://h55.ch/en/

H55 is a Swiss company that produces electric propulsion systems for the aviation industry. The company is a spin-off of the Solar Impulse project. André Borschberg, a former pilot for the project, is a co-founder. The company is headquartered in Sion, Switzerland.

== History ==
The company was founded in 2017 and is headquartered in Sion, Switzerland. Its founders are André Borschberg, Sébastien Demont, and Gregory Blatt. H55 has locations in Toulouse, France, and Montreal, Canada.

The company's main product, a battery system, was approved by the European Union Aviation Safety Agency (EASA) in early 2024.

In April 2021 it partnered with Harbour Air, a Richmond, British Columbia based seaplane operator. Harbour Air is converting de Havilland Canada DHC-2 Beavers to run on electricity, using H55 batteries.

In 2022 H55 agreed to supply battery systems for a Pratt & Whitney Canada (P&WC) regional hybrid-electric flight demonstrator program. The project intends to convert a De Havilland Canada Dash 8 to be hybrid-electric, aiming for a 30% improvement in fuel efficiency. Other partners include: Collins Aerospace; De Havilland Canada; the Canadian government's National Research Council Canada (NRC); and the Quebec government's Innovative Vehicle Institute (IVI). CAE and Piper Aircraft selected H55 to provide the battery for the electric conversion kit for the Piper Archer aircraft.

In 2023, H55 expanded into Canada as H55 Canada Inc. The company received a $10,000,000 interest-free loan from the Canadian government as part of the Aerospace Regional Recovery Initiative. Investissement Québec, a provincial investment company, invested in H55. The company planned to open a manufacturing facility in Greater Montréal with the investment to provide batteries and other products to the North American market.

H55 registered a company in Toulouse, France in December, 2023 to partner with Czech plane maker BRM Aero on an electric two-seater aircraft. In 2025 H55 began demonstration flights of its B23 electric two-seat plane, based on the Bristell B23 ultralight.
