= ICCT =

ICCT is a four-character abbreviation with multiple meanings, and different capitalisations:

- International Criminal Court (ICCt) was established in 2002 as a permanent tribunal to prosecute individuals for genocide, crimes against humanity, and war crimes
- International Centre for Counter-Terrorism the Hague, is an independent organisation for the creation, collation and dissemination of information and skills relating to the legal and human rights aspects of counter-terrorism.
- International Council on Clean Transportation is an independent non-profit organisation that provides technical and scientific analysis to environmental regulators.
- International Committee of Clean Technologies, a non-governmental organisation.
- International Catamaran Challenge Trophy (ICCT) is a match racing series for catamarans (under sail), held annually.
