= Jean-Philippe Bonardi =

French and Swiss economist (born 1970)

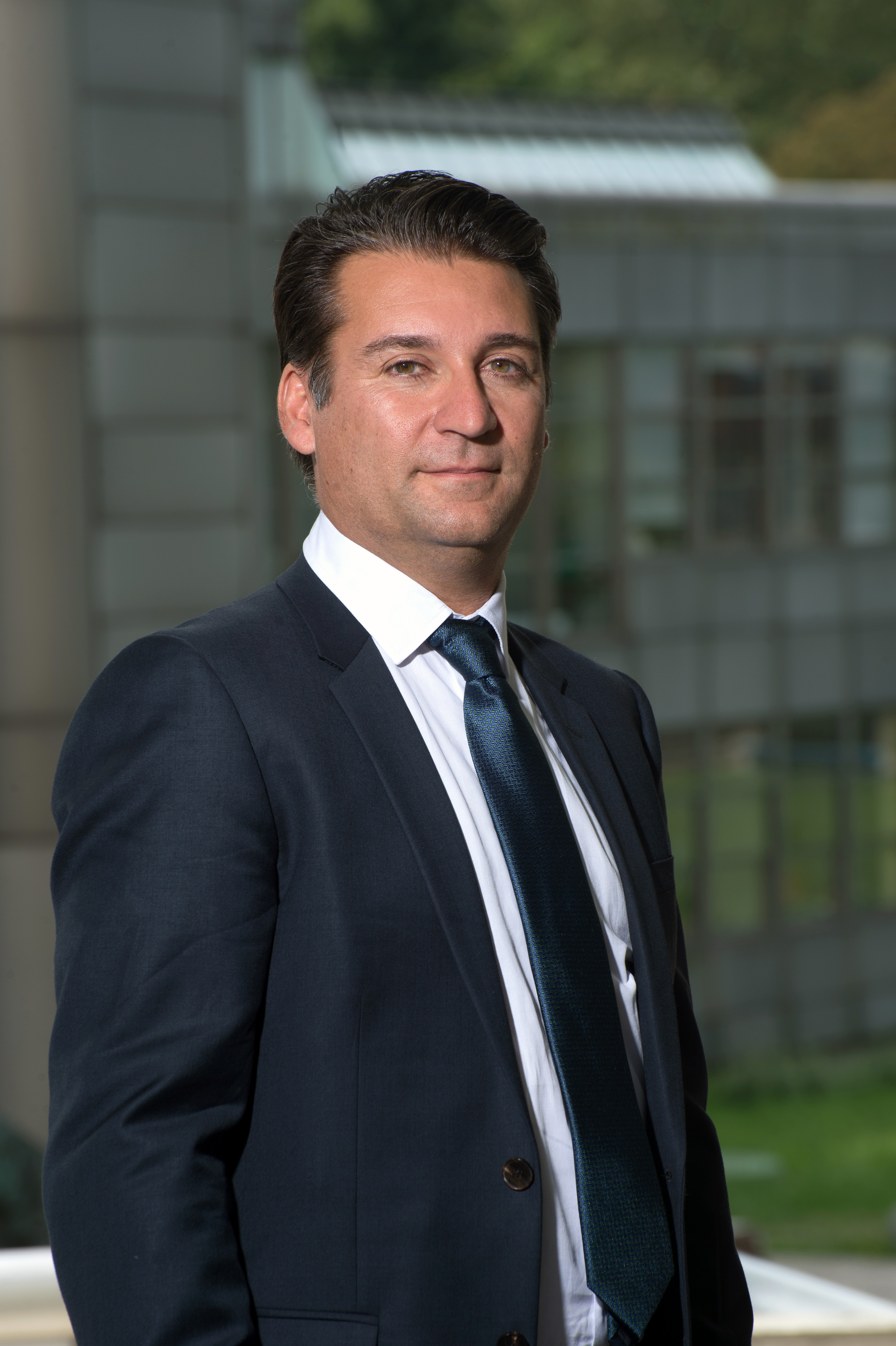
- Born: May 20, 1970 (age 55); Nice, France
- Citizenship: Swiss
- Scientific career
- Fields: Business economics; Strategic Management
- Institutions: HEC Lausanne, University of Lausanne; Ivey Business School, University of Western Ontario; Haas School of Business, University of California, Berkeley; Freeman School of Business, Tulane University

Jean-Philippe Bonardi (born May 20, 1970) is a French and Swiss Professor of Business Economics and Strategic Management, known for his work on nonmarket strategies (or how firms interact strategically with public policy-makers and external stakeholders). He was the Dean of HEC Lausanne, the faculty of Business and Economics of the University of Lausanne in Switzerland, from 2015 to 2021, when he was replaced by Marianne Schmid Mast.

== Biography ==
He graduated from HEC Paris (France), in 1993, obtained a master in economics from the University of Aix-Marseille III in 1994, and earned his PhD at HEC Paris in 2001. From 2000 to 2008, he was an Assistant and Associate Professor in the ‘Business, Economics and Public Policy’ department of the Ivey Business School at the University of Western Ontario (Canada). He then moved as a Full Professor to HEC Lausanne in 2008. He held various academic charges, such as Vice-Dean in charge of external and international affairs (2012-2015), and then Dean (2015-2021).

He held various visiting research and teaching positions such as at the Haas School of Business of the University of Berkeley (US), the Freeman School of Business of Tulane University (US), or the University of New South Wales (Australia).

Bonardi also served in the editorial boards of several international academic journals. In particular, he and was Associate Editor of the Academy of Management Review.

== Deanship ==
While Bonardi was Dean of HEC Lausanne, it achieved the 5-year EQUIS accreditation delivered by EFMD for the first time in the school's history. Also, HEC Lausanne became one of the founding members of the QTEM network (Quantitative Methods for Economics and Management), an international network of international schools allowing students to do their master program in highly quantitative management topics and in three countries.

Bonardi is one of the founders of the E4S Center (‘Enterprise for Society’) created jointly by the University of Lausanne (through HEC Lausanne), the Ecole Polytechnique Fédérale de Lausanne (EFPL) and IMD (the Institute for Management Development).

== Research on firms' nonmarket strategies ==
Bonardi's research focuses to the field of firms’ nonmarket strategies, i.e. the strategies developed by firms to influence public policies (public politics) and handle external stakeholders such as social activists (private politics).
