= Arthur P. Brief =

American scholar

- Known for: Research on workplace ethics, diversity, and organizational behavior
- Awards: Academy of Management Distinguished Scholarly Contributions to Management Award; Academy of Management Distinguished Educator Award

Academic background
- Education: University of Wisconsin–Madison

Academic work
- Discipline: Organizational behavior
- Institutions: University of Utah; Tulane University; Rice University
- Doctoral students: Joerg Dietz

Arthur P. Brief is an American scholar specializing in organizational behavior, workplace ethics, and diversity in organizations. He is Professor Emeritus and held the George S. Eccles Chair in Business Ethics at the University of Utah's David Eccles School of Business.

== Academic career ==
Brief earned his BA in industrial management at the University of Tennessee and his MS and PhD in Management and Organization from the University of Wisconsin–Madison. He has held academic appointments at Rice University and Tulane University and served as the George S. Eccles Chair in Business Ethics at the University of Utah. Brief was a Fulbright Fellow at the University of Lisbon and has held visiting positions at Harvard Business School as the Thomas S. Murphy Distinguished Research Professor and at the University of Virginia as a Batten Fellow.

== Contributions to research ==
Brief's research has had a significant impact on the field of organizational behavior, particularly in the areas of workplace ethics, diversity, and prosocial behavior in organizations. His research on modern racism and employment discrimination has influenced discussions on workplace diversity and ethical management practices.

== Editorial roles ==
Brief has contributed to the field as editor of the Academy of Management Journal, editor of the Academy of Management Review, and co-founder of the Academy of Management Annals.

== Awards and recognition ==
Brief has received numerous accolades, including the Academy of Management Distinguished Scholarly Contributions to Management Award and the Distinguished Educator Award. He is a Fellow of the Academy of Management.

== Mentorship and notable students ==
Arthur P. Brief has mentored several prominent scholars in the field of organizational behavior, including Joerg Dietz, who has made significant contributions to diversity management and organizational behavior. Dietz's research has been published in leading academic journals, and he has received recognition for his work on workplace diversity and inclusion.

== Selected publications ==
- Brief, Arthur P.; Motowidlo, Stephan J. (1986). "Prosocial Organizational Behaviors". Academy of Management Review. 11 (4): 710–725. doi:10.5465/amr.1986.4283909.
- Brief, Arthur P. (1998). Attitudes In and Around Organizations. SAGE Publications. ISBN 978-0761900177.
- Brief, Arthur P.; Weiss, Howard M. (2002). "Organizational Behavior: Affect in the Workplace". Annual Review of Psychology. 53 (1): 279–307. doi:10.1146/annurev.psych.53.100901.135156. PMID 11752487.
