= Emmanuel Amoos =

Swiss politician (born 1980)

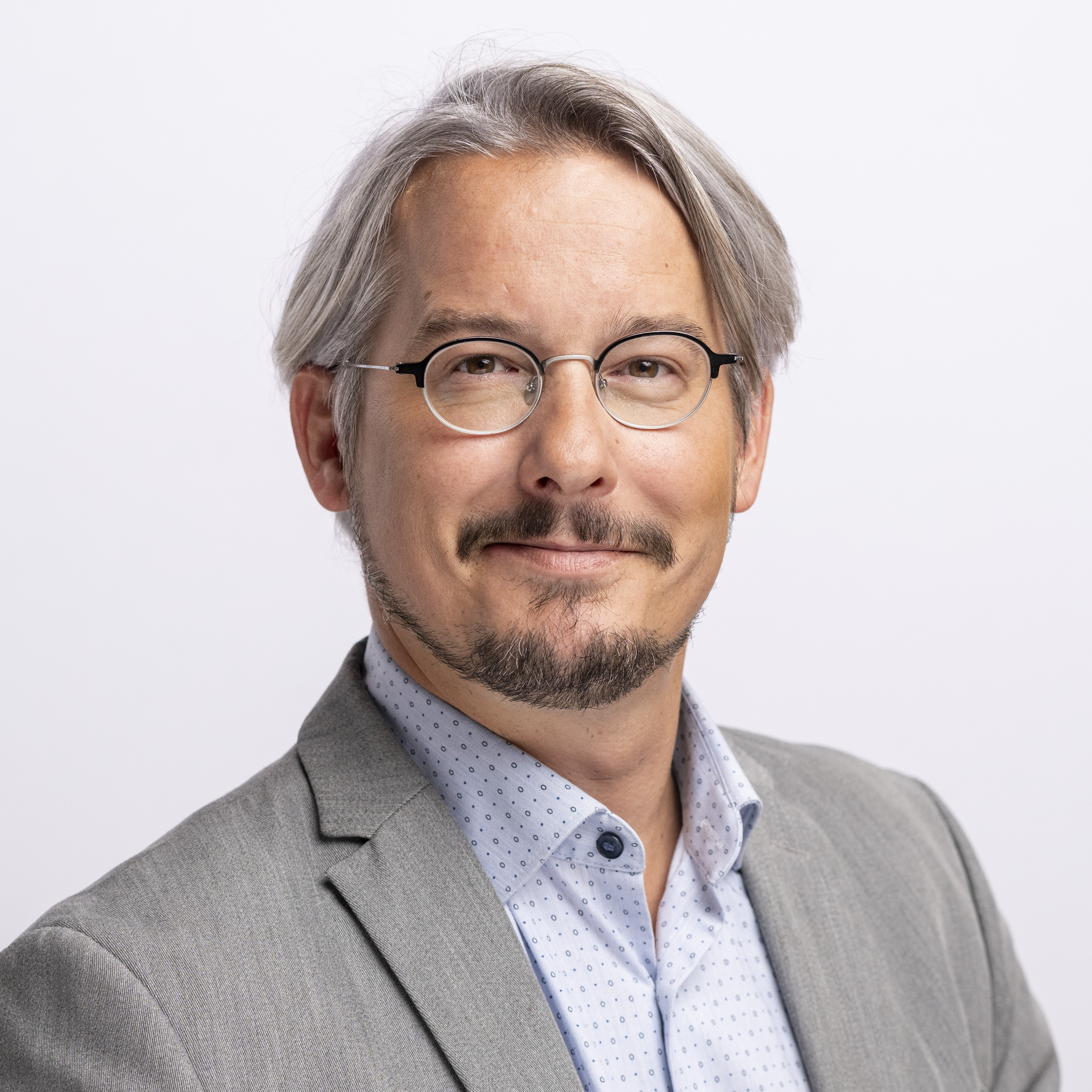

Emmanuel Amoos (born 31 July 1980) is a Swiss Socialist Party politician and a member of the National Council from Canton of Valais since 2021.

== Early life and education ==
Emmanuel Amoos was born in 1980 in Sierra with roots to Venthône in Valais. He studied for a degree in economics at HEC Lausanne.

== Political career ==
He was elected municipal councilor for the former Venthône municipality for three legislative terms (2009 – 2020). In 2013, he was elected Deputy from the District of Sierre to the Valais Grand Council and served on the Finance Committee for the legislative term and was re-elected in 2017. He was appointed leader of the Left Alliance group in the council and served on the Economy and Energy committee until 2019 when he ran for a seat in the National Council but failed to secure the seat as he placed 2nd with 10,687 votes behind the winner Mathias Reynard. He was elected to the Valais Council of State in 2021 and was appointed to the committee on Science, Education and Culture.
