= Bertrand Piccard =

Swiss balloonist and psychiatrist

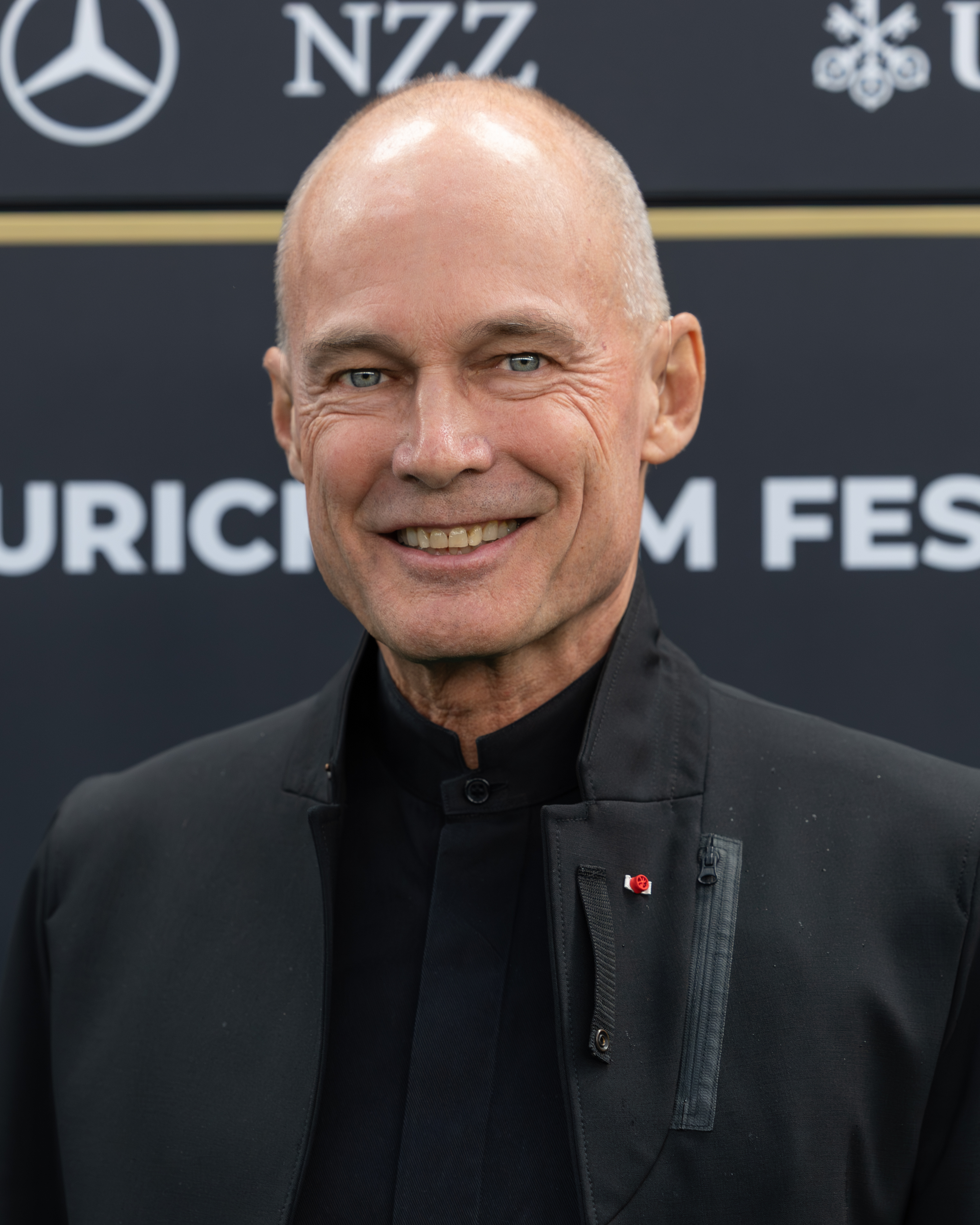
- Bertrand Piccard on the Green Carpet at the 2025 Zurich Film Festival.
- Born: 1 March 1958 (age 68); Lausanne, Vaud, Switzerland
- Education: University of Lausanne
- Occupations: Psychiatrist and aviator
- Organization: Solar Impulse
- Known for: Ballooning, solar flight
- Children: 3
- Father: Jacques Piccard
- Relatives: Auguste Piccard (grandfather)
- Website: bertrandpiccard.com

Bertrand Piccard FRSGS (born 1 March 1958) is a Swiss explorer, psychiatrist and environmentalist. Along with Brian Jones, he was the first to complete a non-stop balloon flight around the globe, in a balloon named Breitling Orbiter 3. He was the initiator, chairman, and pilot, with André Borschberg, of Solar Impulse, the first successful round-the-world solar-powered flight. In 2012 Piccard was awarded a Champions of the Earth award by the UN Environment Programme. He is the founder and chairman of the Solar Impulse Foundation.

== Early life and education ==
Piccard was born in Lausanne, Switzerland. His grandfather Auguste Piccard was a balloonist and undersea explorer, and his father Jacques Piccard was an undersea explorer.

As a child, Piccard was taken to the launch of several space flights from Cape Canaveral. Initially afraid of heights, at age 16 he took up hang gliding. He developed early interests in flight and human behaviour in extreme situations. He received a degree from the University of Lausanne in psychiatry.

== Career ==
Piccard has since become a lecturer and supervisor at the Swiss Medical Society for Hypnosis (SMSH).

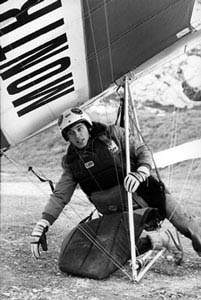
Bertrand Piccard in 1982

Piccard obtained licences to fly balloons, airplanes, gliders, and motorized gliders. In Europe, he was one of the pioneers of hang gliding and microlight flying during the 1970s. He became the European hang-glider aerobatics champion in 1985.

=== Breitling Orbiter ===
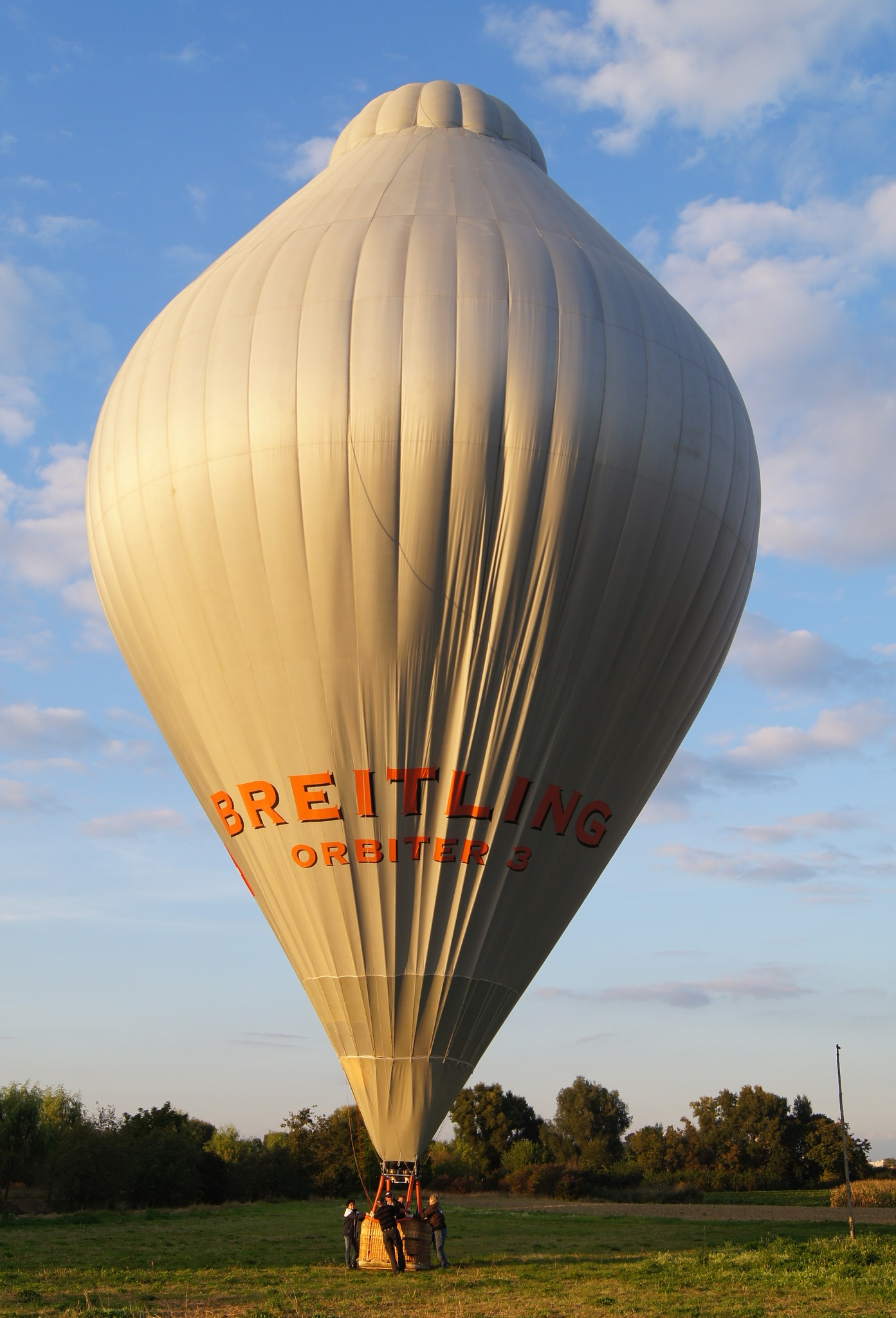
Breitling Orbiter 3

On 1 March 1999, Piccard and Brian Jones took off in the balloon Breitling Orbiter 3, a bright red, carbon-composite, egg-shaped craft measuring sixteen feet long and seven feet in diameter, from Château d'Oex in Switzerland on the first successful non-stop balloon circumnavigation of the globe—the first in-atmospheric circumnavigation not requiring any fuel for forward motion. Piccard and Jones, in cooperation with a team of meteorologists on the ground, maneuvered into a series of jet streams that carried them 25,361 miles to land in Egypt after a 45,755 km (28,431 mi) flight lasting 19 days, 21 hours, and 47 minutes.

=== Solar Impulse ===
During November 2003, Piccard announced a project, in cooperation with the École Polytechnique Fédérale de Lausanne (EPFL), for a solar-powered, long-range aircraft named Solar Impulse. Piccard began construction in 2007, and conducted brief test flights in 2009 with André Borschberg. By 2006, he had assembled a multi-disciplinary team of fifty specialists from six countries, assisted by approximately one hundred outside advisers.

The project was financed by a number of private companies and individuals in Europe. The first company to fund the project officially was Semper, after Eric Freymond was convinced of its future success by Piccard. Owing to international funding for the project, the Solar Impulse is a European craft, not a Swiss one, despite scientific and medical assistance from the EPFL and Hirslanden Clinique Cecil.

In 2010, Solar Impulse 1 (Si1) made its first nighttime flight. In 2011, it landed at Bourget Field in Paris. In 2012, it made its first intercontinental flight from Switzerland to Morocco in two legs. The first leg in the one-seater aircraft was piloted by Borschberg from Payerne, Switzerland, to Madrid, Spain, and the second leg by Piccard from Madrid to Rabat, Morocco. In 2013, he and Borschberg traversed the United States from Mountain View, California, to JFK Airport in New York City. There were several stops along the way, including Washington, D.C.

In 2015, Solar Impulse set out to accomplish the first round-the-world solar flight in history. The voyage consisted of multiple flights starting on 9 March and was scheduled to conclude about five months later. In order to switch pilots, stopovers were scheduled at locations in India, Myanmar, China, The United States, and southern Europe or northern Africa. Piccard piloted the ninth segment of the round-the-world trip and landed the Solar Impulse 2 (Si2) in Moffett Field in California on 24 April 2016 after three days of flying from Kalaeloa Airport, Hawaii.

André Borschberg and Piccard completed their circumnavigation of the globe with the solar-powered aircraft Solar Impulse on 26 July 2016. On the same day, they announced the creation of the World Alliance for Clean Technologies.

For his role in delivering and piloting Solar Impulse, Bertrand was awarded the Mungo Park Medal by the Royal Scottish Geographical Society in 2018. This was awarded jointly with André Borschberg.

=== The UN and the World Alliance ===
Piccard was named a Goodwill Ambassador for the UN Environment Programme in December 2015, partway through his solar flight around the world. Four months after the completion of the flight, during the 2016 United Nations Climate Change Conference, Piccard and the Solar Impulse Foundation launched the UNEP-endorsed non-profit World Alliance for Clean Technologies.

In January 2018 Piccard told the Economic Times that in his travels he had collected from a total of five continents more than 500 ideas to protect the environment that were also profitable.

In May 2018, Piccard and his Foundation announced the Efficient Solutions Label, a designation given to qualifying solutions after a four-week evaluation headed by World Alliance experts. In 2021 Piccard told Forbes that the foundation had identified and certified 1000 solutions, profit-making for both companies and consumers.

=== Hydrogen Car Record ===
In 2019, Piccard set a record for the most miles driven by a hydrogen car without refueling, driving a Hyundai NEXO hydrogen-powered SUV for a total trip of 778 kilometers (483.4 miles) in Europe, with the goal to promote hydrogen technology.

== Solar Impulse Foundation ==
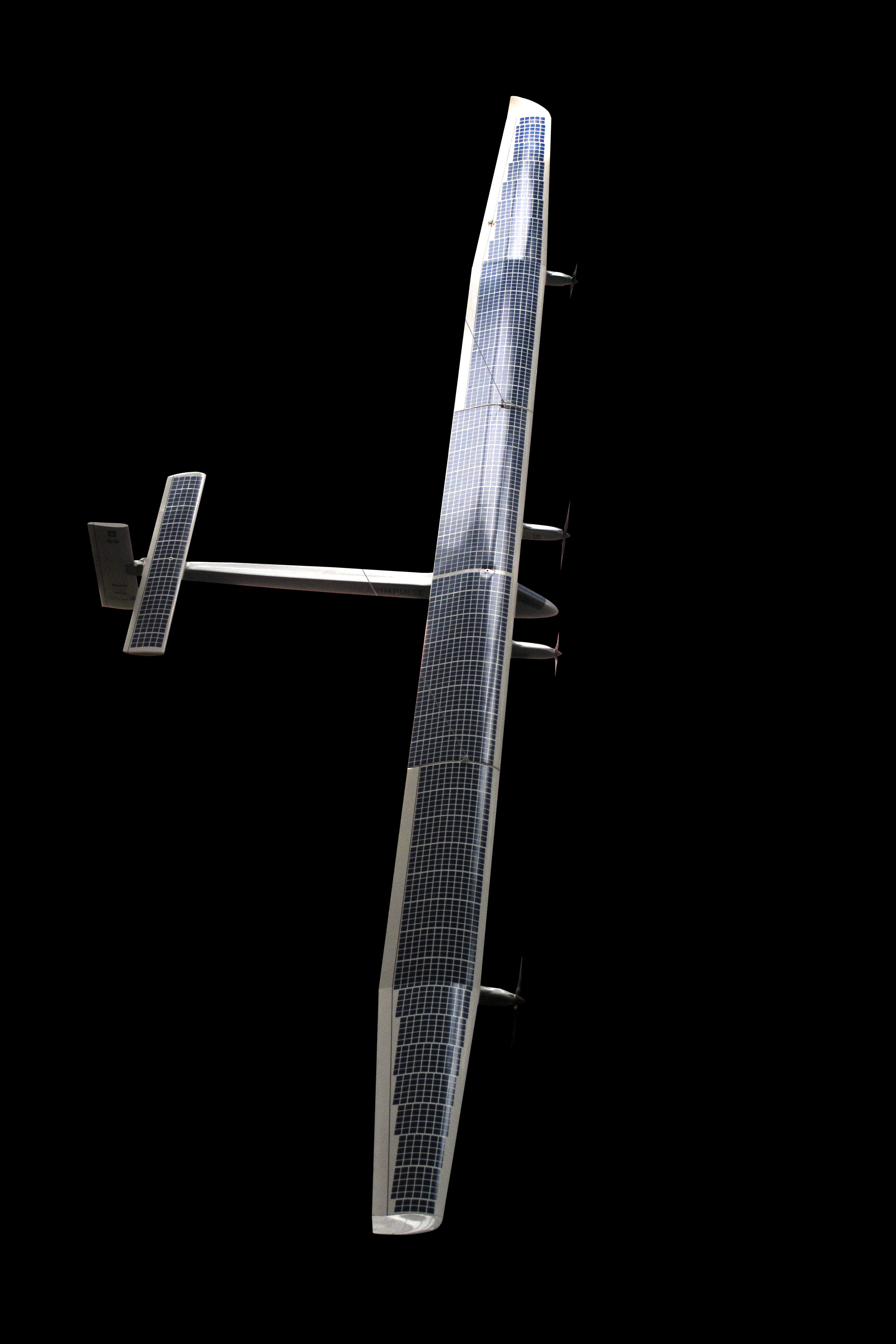
Solar Impulse

Following his round-the-world solar flight with Solar Impulse, Piccard launched the Solar Impulse Foundation. Its goal is to select innovative solutions to the environmental crisis and promote them to decision-makers in order to accelerate the transition to a sustainable economy. To select these clean solutions, the Solar Impulse Foundation created the Solar Impulse Efficient Solution Label in May 2018.

This certification is attributed following a strict assessment process made by a pool of independent experts, and it recognizes both the economic profitability and environmental impact of products, processes and services. The Label is awarded to solutions which contribute to the achievement of one of the five Sustainable Development Goals related to water, energy, consumption and production, industry, cities and communities. In April 2021, Piccard and the Solar Impulse Foundation achieved its goal of selecting the first 1000 solutions.

== Other activities ==
- European Investment Bank (EIB), Member of the Climate and Environment Advisory Council (since 2021)

== Family ==
Piccard's family tree includes four generations of explorers. His grandfather, Auguste Piccard, was the first to fly to the stratosphere, in 1931. His father, Jacques Piccard, was first to descend to the bottom of the Mariana Trench, in 1960. His great uncle Jean Félix Piccard and aunt Jeannette Piccard were also balloonists, and their son Donald Piccard was the first to fly across the English Channel in a balloon. The family's attitude, Piccard once explained, is that being told that something is impossible is "exactly why we try to do it."

== Personal life ==
Piccard is married with three children.

== Awards and honours ==
- Honorary Professor and Honorary Doctor of Science and Letters
- Mungo Park Medal 2018 of the Royal Scottish Geographical Society
- Gold Medal of Youth and Sport
- Harmon Trophy
- Hubbard Medal (1999)
- Golden Plate Award of the American Academy of Achievement (1999)
- FAI Gold Air Medal
- Winner of the first trans-Atlantic balloon race (1992 Chrysler Challenge)
- Légion d'Honneur (Commandeur)
- Officer of the Order of the Alawites
- Médaille de l'aéronautique

== Works ==
- Changer d'Altitude (Éditions Stock, Paris) 2014 ISBN 978-2-234-07725-6
- The Greatest Adventure (Headline, London) 1999 ISBN 0-7472-7128-3 or Around the world in 20 Days (same content published by Wiley, New York) 1999 ISBN 0-471-37820-8 — pictured
- Quand le vent souffle dans le sens de ton chemin (out of print) 1993 ISBN 2883930104
- Une trace dans le ciel (Robert Laffont, Paris) 1999 ISBN 2-8289-0881-X
- André Borschberg; Bertrand Piccard (2017). Objectif Soleil (in French). Stock. ISBN 978-2-234-08083-6.
- Francis Pollet; Bertrand Piccard (2020). Le futur de l'avion : Les prochains défis de l'industrie aéronautique (in French). FYP Éditions. ISBN 978-2-36405-203-1.

== See also ==
- List of firsts in aviation
- List of circumnavigations
