= HEC Lausanne =

Swiss business school

- École des hautes études commerciales
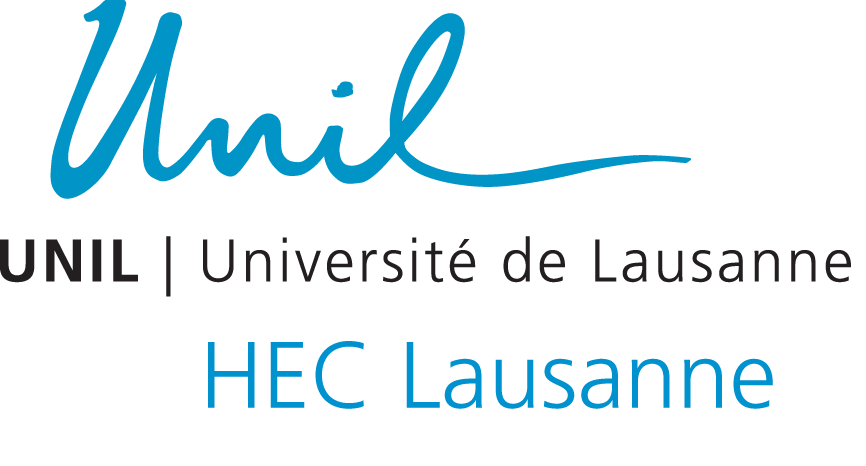
- Type: Public
- Established: 1911
- Affiliations: EQUIS, AMBA
- Dean: Marianne Schmid Mast
- Academic staff: 250 researchers
- Students: 3'300
- Location: Lausanne, Vaud, Switzerland; 46°31′20″N 6°35′03″E
- Website: www.unil.ch/hec

HEC Lausanne (standing for Faculté des Hautes études commerciales), also called the Faculty of Business and Economics of the University of Lausanne, is the affiliated business school of the University of Lausanne. Since 1911, HEC Lausanne has been developing teaching and research in the field of business and economics. HEC Lausanne offers Bachelor’s, Master’s, and PhD degrees, as well as executive education, professional certification, and professional development programs, including a part-time Executive MBA, short, open courses, and tailor-made programs for organizations.

It is considered as one of the 3 leading Swiss business schools, alongside the University of St. Gallen, and the IMD (International Institute for Management Development), also based in Lausanne.

== History ==
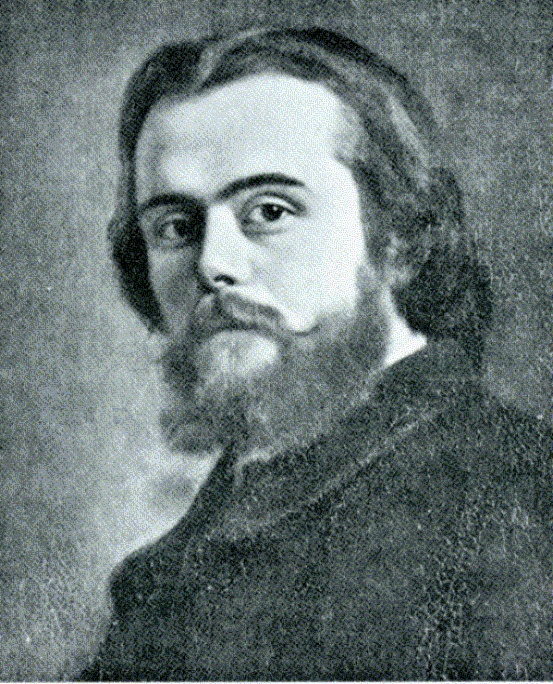
Léon Walras

In 1537, the Academy of Lausanne was founded as a school of theology. In 1890, the Academy of Lausanne received the status of a University; economics was taught within the Faculty of Law. This period was strongly influenced by Léon Walras (1834–1910), the founder of the Lausanne School and creator of the general equilibrium theory. It was also the time of Vilfredo Pareto (1848–1923), the famous author of the concept of Pareto efficiency.

On April 15, 1911, the "Ecole des Hautes Etudes Commerciales" (HEC) was founded by Léon Morf and Georges Paillard within the Faculty of Law. The same year, the school welcomed its 12 first students. Léon Morf, professor of management tools, public accounting, and financial mathematics was its first dean, followed by Georges Paillard.

Over the years, professors like Henri Rieben, founder of the first department of European Integration, François Schaller, President of the Bank Council of the Swiss National Bank from 1986 to 1989, perpetuated the reputation of the school.

In November 2025, the Vaud Council of State responded to a parliamentary interpellation concerning a dismissal within the HEC Faculty of the University of Lausanne and broader concerns about UNIL's institutional climate. The interpellation raised questions about the university's governance, management practices, protection of staff members, and the possible reputational impact of recent controversies. In its response, the Council of State emphasized UNIL's autonomy in personnel matters and declined to comment on the individual case. It also stated that possible improvements to the university's governance model were being examined by the supervising department, the Department of Education and Vocational Training. The response added that, even if governance reforms were introduced, they would not entirely prevent conflicts from arising in an institution of UNIL'

s size.

== Setting ==
HEC Lausanne is located on the University of Lausanne campus, on the western side of the Lausanne metropolitan area, with direct metro rail access to the center of the city. It overlooks Lake Geneva, a major pool for European industry, banking, trade and research. HEC Lausanne collaborates with the Swiss Finance Institute and the Swiss Federal Institute of Technology (EPFL - Management of Technology program), which are also based on the same campus in Lausanne.

== Programs ==
=== Undergraduate school ===
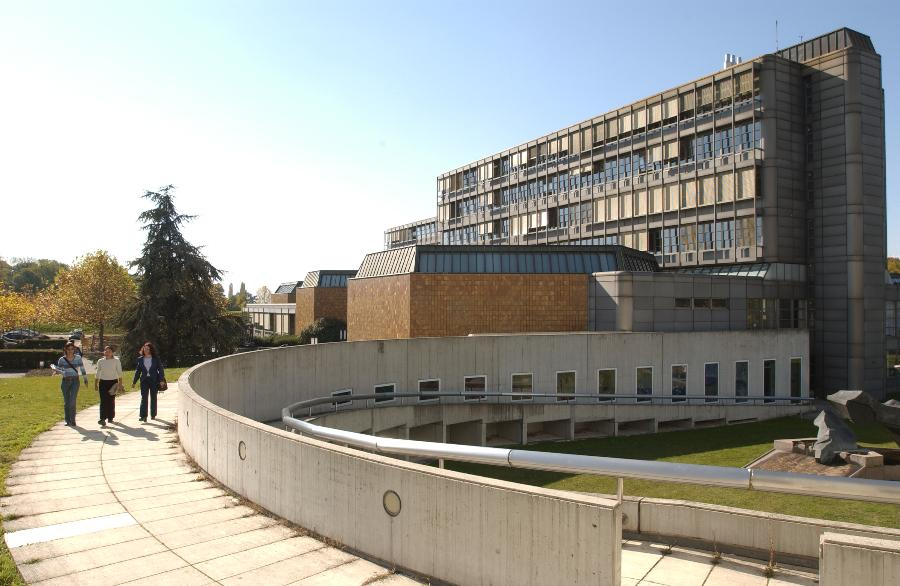
Internef, main building of HEC Lausanne

The three-year cycle has led to the issuance of a Bachelor of Science (BSc) in a chosen specialization. The first two years consist of a common core curriculum in which students learn to master modern management tools and develop their critical thinking. In the third year, students may choose between two specializations: BSc in Management or BSc in Economics.

HEC Lausanne's Bachelor's program in Economics emphasizes a quantitative approach, focusing on mathematical and statistical tools for economic analysis. The curriculum includes core courses like Econometrics and Statistical Methods for Economics. The program encourages an interdisciplinary perspective and offers opportunities for research initiatives. Graduates are prepared for careers in economic analysis, financial modeling, and data analytics across different sectors. Rankings from institutions such as the Financial Times and Eduniversal to HEC Lausanne's recognition in the academic landscape.

=== Graduate school ===
HEC Lausanne Masters of Science (MSc) include two to three semesters and a thesis that can be associated with a three- to six- month internship. All Masters can lead to a PhD program. HEC Lausanne offers the following Masters of Science (MSc) degrees: MSc in Accounting Control and Finance, MSc in Actuarial Science, MSc in Information Systems, MSc in Economics, MSc in Finance, MSc in Management and Master in Law and Economics.

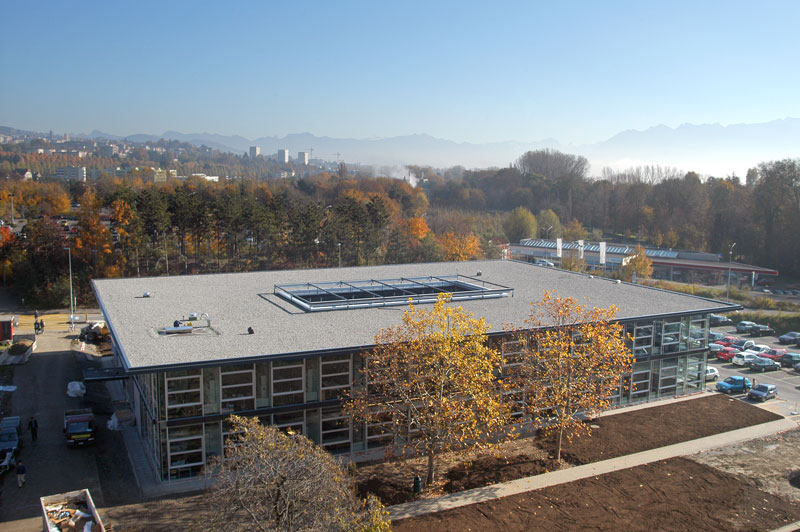
Extranef, main building of the Executive Education

=== Executive MBA ===
Since 1979, HEC Lausanne offers an MBA programme designed for managers and professionals who want to evolve or acquire new competences and responsibilities in their career.

The part-time Executive MBA programme lasts 16 months and participants can choose between two focus areas: Management & Corporate Finance and Healthcare Management.

=== Executive Education - Continuing Education ===
HEC Lausanne also offers various programs of Executive Education:

- Executive Masters (MAS):
  - European Sport Governance (MESGO) - in collaboration with 5 academic institutions and universities and 6 leading sports institutions,
  - International Taxation - in collaboration with the Faculty of Law, Criminal Sciences & Public Administration,
  - Healthcare Management;
- Certificates (CAS) / Diplomas (DAS):
  - Strategic Marketing and Communication (CAS/DAS),
  - Finance and Accounting (CAS),
  - Strategic Risk in Banking (CAS),
  - Sport Management (CAS),
  - Healthcare Management (CAS);
- Short Programs - Short and open programs, which last from 1 to 8 days in the following fields:
  - Marketing and Communication,
  - Finance and Accounting,
  - Strategic and Financial Risk,
  - Strategic leadership;
- Customized Programs - Executive Education platform offers to businesses, organisations, associations and other groups to develop tailor-made training programs specifically designed according to their needs and requirements.
- Affiliated Programs:
  - Sport Administration and Technology (MAS) - in collaboration with the AISTS,
  - Doing Business in Asia (CAS) - in collaboration with the EPFL,
  - Cultural Management (DAS) - in collaboration with the FCUE.

=== PhD programmes ===
HEC Lausanne offers the following doctoral programs (PhD): PhD in Actuarial Science, PhD in Information Systems, PhD in Economics, PhD in Finance, PhD in Management, PhD in History of Economic Thought.

== Accreditation and rankings ==
The Faculty received the AMBA and EQUIS accreditations for the high quality of its programs, research-, and teaching-activities. Through the University of Lausanne, it is also an accredited Swiss university.

== Deans ==
- 2021- : Marianne Schmid Mast
- 2015-2021 : Jean-Philippe Bonardi
- 2012-2015 : Thomas von Ungern-Sternberg
- 2009-2012 : Daniel Oyon
- 2006-2009 : Suzanne de Treville
- 2004-2006 : François Grize
- 2000-2004 : Alexander Bergmann
- 1990-2000 : Olivier Blanc
- 1986-1990 : Francis Léonard
- 1977-1986 : Charles Iffland
- 1961-1977 : Robert Grosjean
- 1936-1961 : Jules Chuard
- 1928-1936 : Adolphe Blaser
- 1925-1928 : Georges Paillard
- 1911-1925 : Léon Morf

== Notable people ==
- Sepp Blatter, President of FIFA
- Etienne Jornod, Chairman of Galenica and Chairman of NZZ
- Louis C. Camilleri, CEO of Ferrari and Chairman of Philip Morris International
- Jean-Claude Biver, Chairman of LVMH watch division & CEO of Hublot
- Jacques de Watteville, Chairman of BCV
- André Borschberg, Professional Pilot, Co-Founder and CEO of Solar Impulse
- Claude Béglé, CEO & Executive Chairman of Symbioswiss
- Vincent Hort, General Secretary of Assura
- Goetschin Blaise, CEO of BCGE (Banque Cantonale de Genève)
- Nicolas Campiche, CEO of Pictet Alternative Investments
- Daniel Wanner, CFO of Pictet & Cie
- Thierry Kenel, CFO of Swatch Group
- Alexandre Zeller, CEO of HSBC Privat Bank Suisse SA and former CEO of BCV (Banque Cantonale Vaudoise)
- Hubert Keller, Managing Partner at Lombard Odier
- Emmanuel Amoos politician
- Yvan Cardenas, CFO of Swissquote Group Holding SA

== Bibliography ==
- L'Ecole des hautes études commerciales: à l'occasion de son XXVe anniversaire: son histoire, son présent, son avenir, Lausanne, Direction de l'école, 1937.
- Cinquantenaire de l'Ecole des hautes études commerciales, Lausanne, Payot, 1962.
- 1537-1987: de l'Académie à l'Université de Lausanne, Lausanne, Musée historique de l'Ancien-Evêché, 1987.
- Dictionnaire des professeurs de l'Université de Lausanne dès 1890, Lausanne, Université de Lausanne, 2000.
- Nicole Meystre-Schaeren, "Université de Lausanne en français", Dictionnaire historique de la Suisse (en ligne), 2013.
