= André Borschberg =

Swiss businessman and pilot (born 1952)

André Borschberg FRSGS
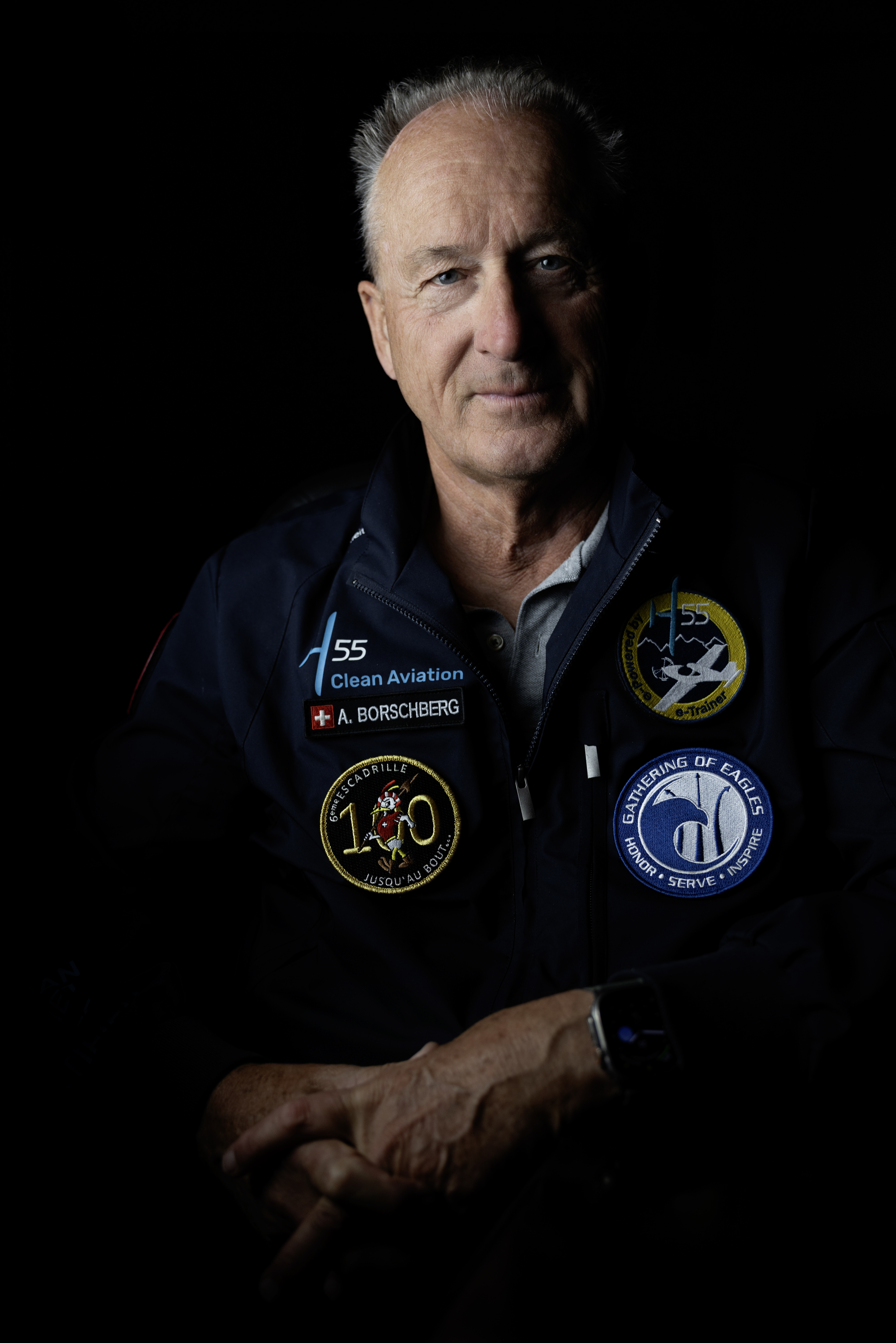
- Borschberg in 2025
- Born: 13 December 1952 (age 73); Zürich, Switzerland
- Education: École Polytechnique Fédérale de Lausanne, MS 1976; MIT Sloan, MS 1983
- Known for: Completing the first round-the-world solar flight and the longest solo flight in an airplane of any kind: 117 hours and 52 minutes
- Awards: 14 FAI world records
- Aviation career
- Famous flights: Longest solo solar flight ever in aviation history from Nagoya to Hawaii
- Air force: Swiss Air Force

André Borschberg (born 13 December 1952) is a Swiss entrepreneur, explorer, pilot, and professional speaker. He is the co-founder and CEO of Solar Impulse. In July 2016, he co-piloted and successfully completed the first manned solar-powered flight to circumnavigate the Earth.

Borschberg is the co-founder and executive chairman of H55, a company that develops electric propulsion technology for the aviation industry and serves as a member of the World Economic Forum Community of Experts.

Borschberg holds several world records for his work on Solar Impulse, a project aimed to design, build, and fly long-range manned solar-powered aircraft. On July 7th, 2010, he completed the first 24-hour solar-powered flight, setting the records for the longest manned solar-powered flight and the greatest height reached by a solar aircraft. During the Japan-to-Hawaii leg of the flight, Borschberg flew non-stop for 117 hours and 52 minutes, breaking Steve Fossett’s 2006 world record for longest solo flight in an airplane of any kind.

Borschberg holds 14 Fédération Aéronautique Internationale (FAI) world records, including: free distance along a course, straight distance, and the longest solo flight in a fixed-wing aircraft of any kind.

For his role in delivering and piloting Solar Impulse, Borschberg was jointly awarded the Mungo Park Medal by the Royal Scottish Geographical Society in 2018, with Bertrand Piccard.

== Early life and education ==
André Borschberg was born on December 13, 1952, in Zürich, Switzerland. He holds a master's degree in mechanical engineering from École Polytechnique Fédérale de Lausanne (EPFL) and another in management science from the Sloan School of Management at Massachusetts Institute of Technology. He also holds professional certifications in Financial Management and Business Management from HEC Lausanne.

== Career ==
Borschberg trained as a jet pilot in the Swiss Air Force before entering the business field. He worked as a consultant at the consultancy firm McKinsey & Company for five years. In 2002, he co-founded Innovative Silicon, a microprocessor technology company that produced a novel type of DRAM.

== Solar Impulse ==
Borschberg holds a management and engineering position at Solar Impulse and is also a pilot for the company.

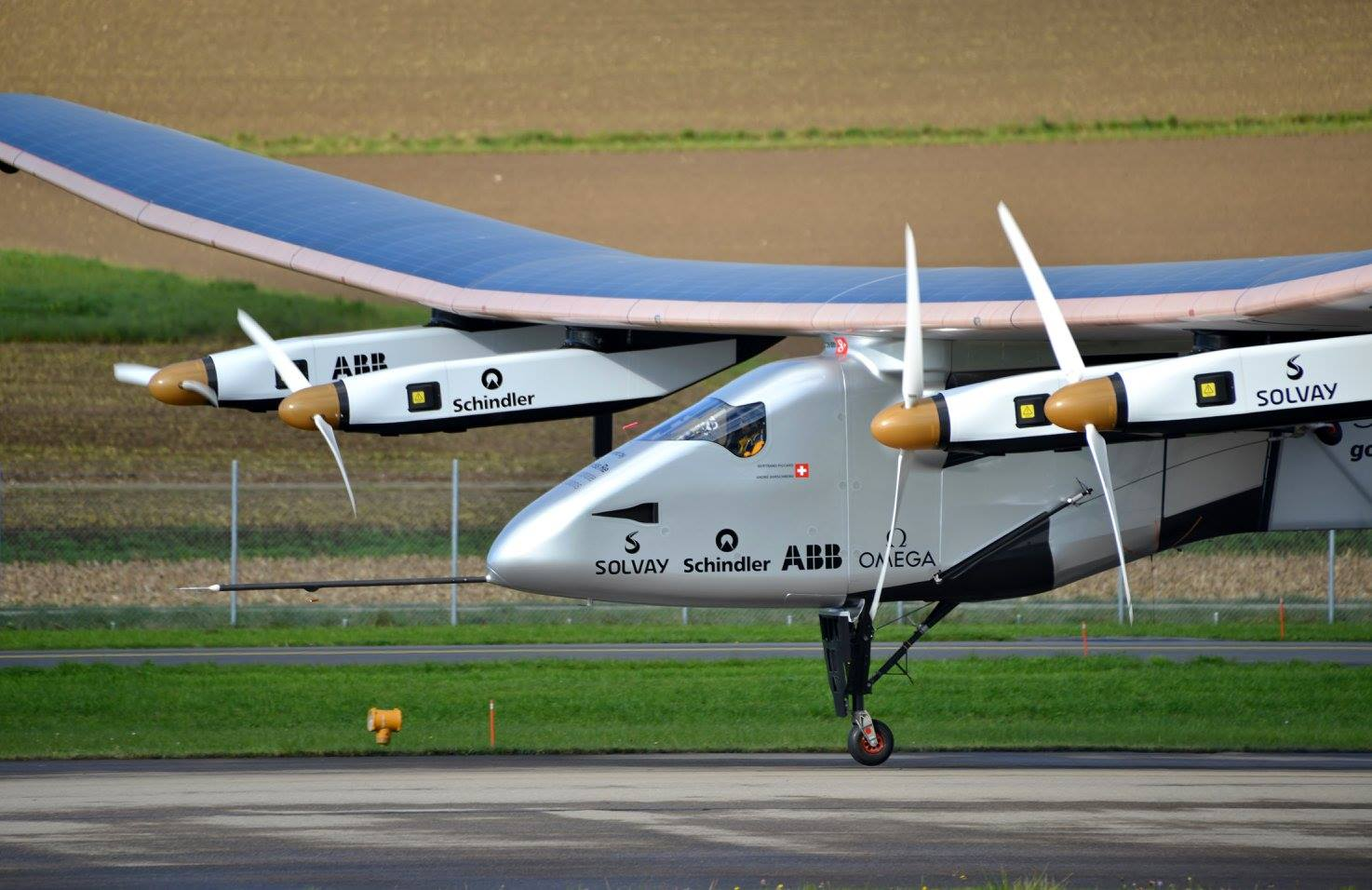
Solar Impulse 2 on a runway in 2014

=== Solar Impulse 1 missions ===
On July 7th, 2010, André Borschberg flew the Solar Impulse airplane for 26 hours, the first flight through both day and night using only solar energy.

Solar Impulse HB-SIA, piloted by André Borschberg, completed three international flights during the European campaign: Payerne to Brussels on 13 May (630 km), Brussels to Paris–Le Bourget on June 14th (395 km), and Paris-Le Bourget to Payerne on July 3rd (426 km).

Solar Impulse, piloted alternately by André Borschberg and Bertrand Piccard, made its first intercontinental flight in 2012 from Switzerland (Payerne) to Madrid, and then on to Morocco.

Solar Impulse completed the crossing of the United States over a 2-month period in the summer of 2013. Bertrand Piccard and André Borschberg, the two pilots, flew from San Francisco to New York, stopping over in cities along the way.

With the goal of the world's first solar-powered round-the-world flight initiated on March 9th, 2015, Solar Impulse claimed, "these flights have provided good learning opportunities in terms of slotting the solar aircraft into international air space and landing at international airports."

=== FAI world records ===
Borschberg has been awarded at least 8 FAI world records flying with Solar Impulse: free distance, free distance along a course, straight distance, straight distance predeclared waypoints, distance along a course, duration, absolute altitude, gain of height. These records were achieved during 3 flights, taking place in 2010, 2012 and 2013.

=== Solar Impulse 2 missions ===
In 2015 and 2016, Borschberg and Bertrand Piccard piloted Solar Impulse 2, completing the first-ever solar-powered flight around the world.

During one of the 17 legs of the flight, from 28 June to 3 July 2015, Borschberg flew Solar Impulse 2 between Nagoya and Kalaeloa, Hawaii for a duration of 4 days, 21 hours, and 52 minutes, breaking the record of the longest solo flight previously held by Steve Fosset.

=== Objectif Soleil ===
In 2017, Borschberg and Bertrand Piccard released an autobiographical book titled Objectif Soleil, about their experience through the Solar Impulse project.

=== H55 ===
In early 2017, Borschberg co-founded the Swiss tech start-up H55, based in Sion. H55 is a technological spinoff of Solar Impulse that develops and sells electric propulsion technologies to aircraft manufacturers. In 2017, the company launched its first aircraft, the Aerol, followed by the BRISTELL Energic in 2019.

== See also ==
- International Committee of Clean Technologies
