= Natalina Bonardi =

Italian Roman Catholic religious sister and Venerable

Venerable Natalina Bonardi
- Born: Maria Bonardi; 4 December 1864; Cuneo, Kingdom of Italy
- Died: 25 July 1945 (aged 80); Vercelli, Kingdom of Italy

Natalina Bonardi (4 December 1864 – 25 July 1945) – born Maria – was a religious sister and a superior who is known for her humility and heroic virtue. She also helped to form the Sisters of Santa Maria di Loreto in Italy. She was proclaimed as venerable on 25 November 2021 by Pope Francis.

== Early life ==
Natalina was born in Cuneo, Italy on 4 December 1864, among several siblings to Giuseppe and Margherita Dogliani, a wealthy, Roman Catholic family. Natalina was baptized in Sant'Ambrogio Church in Cuneo on December 7, 1864 and originally was given the name Maria. In 1871 in the same church, she received her first communion and was later confirmed. Later that year, the family fell into financial ruin after her father was scammed of his fortune.

In 1873, her mother sent Maria to boarding school the Collegio della Sacra Famiglia in Cuneo. In 1878, at age of 14, Maria had a dream that inspired her to dedicated her life to the service of God. In 1880, Maria returned home and took a job with a wealthy family to help her family recoup their losses due to the earlier financial crisis. She was already living as a religious.

== Religious calling ==
In 1882, Maria truly began to seek a life in service to God and entered the Sisters of Good Counsel and took the relgious name Natalina. However, her first experience as a religious sister was rather difficult and confusing. Natalina and some other sisters of the Good Counsel were sent to a different town to teach children. However, soon after, the Archbishop of Vercelli, Lorenzo Pampiro, dissolved the congregation; there are no records describing why it was dissolved.

== Sisters of S. Maria do Loreto ==
Eventually, the archbishop formed an congregation, called of Sisters of S. Maria di Loreto Sant'Antonino, which was dedicated to teaching children and the surrounding communities and "with the aim to re-propose the simple and humble, hardworking and contemplative lifestyle, led by Jesus, Mary and Joseph in the Holy House of Nazareth, which devotion and faith venerate in the miraculous House of the Virgin transported to Loreto." Natalina became superior and also worked with the elderly and did odd jobs such as teaching sewing, teaching drama and even spent time begging if the moment called for it. Her parents instilled hard work in their children and Maria believed in donating her time to help those young and old. The buildings she spent praying and helping the community still stand today.

After transferring the congregation to Vercelli with the approval of the Archbishop, Natalina found herself at odds with the parish priest and some of the older fellow sisters. In 1913, she resigned and it was finally accepted in 1914, whereupon she was assigned as superior and director of the asylum at Santa Maria Rocca in Cuneo.

== Death ==
Natalina made her perpetual vows in 1938 along with 66 fellow sisters. She died 25 July 1945 in Vercelli, Italy. Her last years were spent in quiet solitude and prayer.

== Beatification process ==
Natalina Bonardi was awarded by Pope Francis on 25 November 2021 for her heroic virtue and for founding the Congregation of the Sisters of Saint Mary of Loreto.
