= François Schaller =

Swiss economist

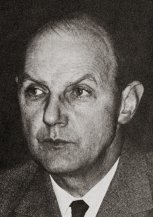
- Born: 3 December 1920; Porrentruy
- Died: 18 February 2006 (aged 85); Lausanne
- Occupation: Economist

Academic background
- Education: University of Lausanne
- Alma mater: University of Bern

François Schaller (1920–2006) was a Swiss economist.

== Early life and education ==
François Schaller was born in Porrentruy on 3 December 1920. He was the son of Georges Schaller, a businessman, and his wife Laetitia (née Crevoisier). He attended the University of Lausanne, where he earned a degree in economics in 1946 and a degree in social sciences in 1950. He habilitated at the University of Bern in 1954.

== Career ==
Schaller was a Privatdozent at the University of Bern between 1954 and 1957, and was a professor of political economy at the University of Lausanne between 1963 and 1986. He also held the title of adjunct professor at the University of Bern between 1959 and 1986 and was a professor of political economy at the University of Neuchâtel between 1967 and 1970.

Schaller was a member of the board of the Swiss National Bank from 1973, and served as the board's chair in 1986-1987.

== Death ==
Schaller died in Lausanne on 18 February 2006.
