= World Alliance for Clean Technologies =

Non-governmental organization

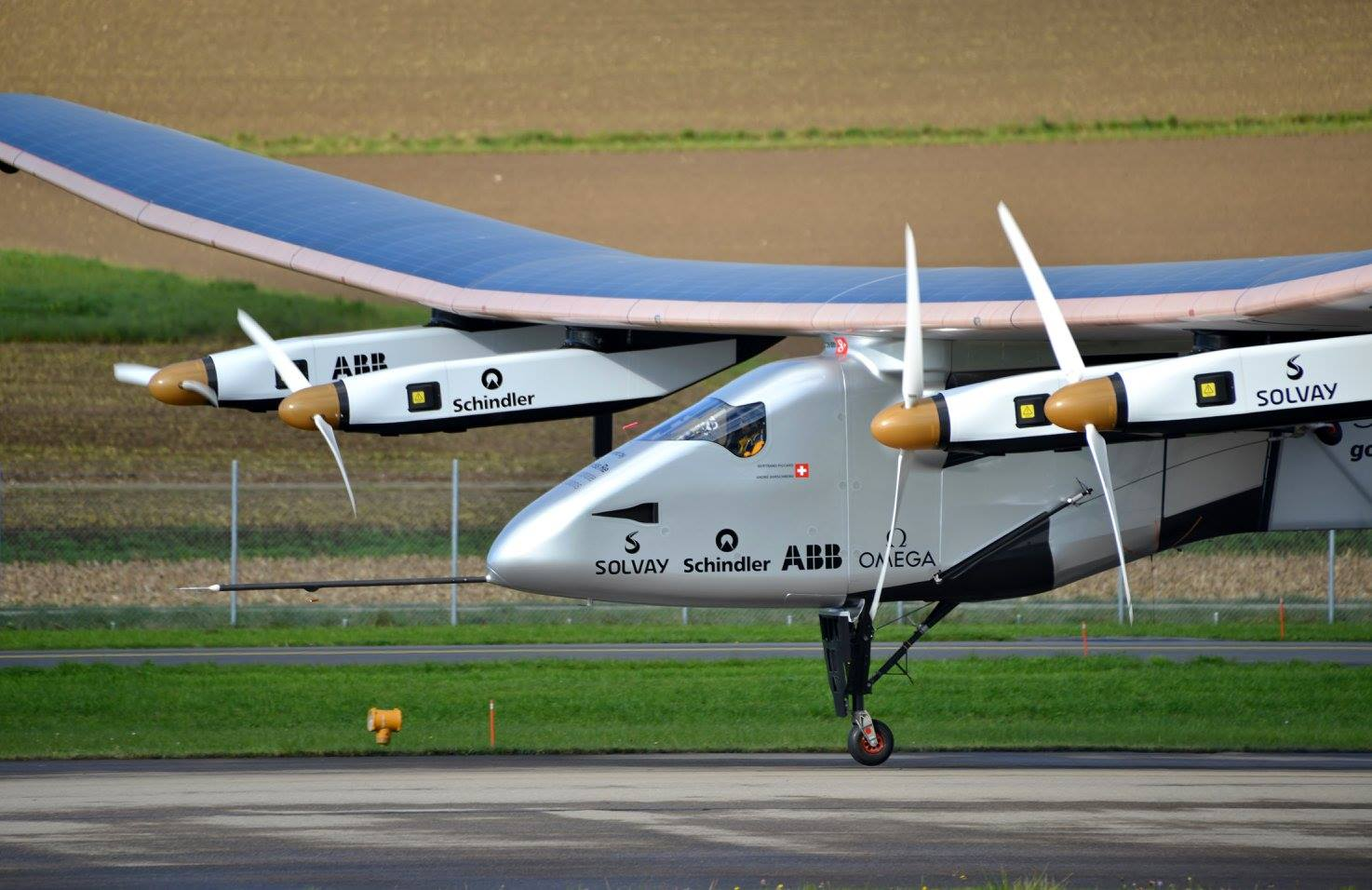
André Borschberg and Bertrand Piccard created the World Alliance for Clean Technologies after achieving the first round-the-world solar flight with Solar Impulse 2.

The World Alliance for Efficient Solutions is a non-governmental organization promoting green energy and sustainable technologies.

The organization was announced on 26 July 2016 by André Borschberg and Bertrand Piccard at the completion of their circumnavigation of the globe with the solar-powered aircraft Solar Impulse (at that time named International Committee of Clean Technologies). Its launch was confirmed in November 2017.

== History ==
During the final flight of their circumnavigation of the globe, Borschberg and Piccard announced the creation of a World Alliance for Clean Technologies (later renamed World Alliance for Efficient Solutions). The aim of this non-governmental organization is to promote green energy and sustainable technologies by bringing together for-profit companies creating green solutions.

World Alliance was launched in November 2017. Piccard said that he and his organization, Solar Impulse Foundation, formed the World Alliance to help draw investors' and businesses' attention to new cleantech startups. Piccard does not receive a salary for his leadership of the alliance, which is funded by donors including Air Liquide, Nestle and Solvay.

In November 2017 at COP23, Piccard tasked the World Alliance with a project to identify 1,000 technological solutions that are both profitable and good for the planet, with the goal to bring environmentalists and industrialists together. He noted in a 2018 Smithsonian article that technologies developed for the solar-powered flight were already being repurposed in new ways, including new ceiling fans based on the solar airplane engines and refrigerators using the cockpit insulation.

When speaking to government leaders, Piccard said he was consistently told that they wanted to protect the environment but it was too expensive. To provide reassurance, in May 2018 Piccard and the Solar Impulse Foundation announced the Efficient Solutions Label, a certification involving a rigorous Ernst and Young-certified evaluation by independent experts to assess each solution's quality and ability to turn a profit. According to Piccard, any Solar Impulse labeled solution must be the best in its class: the most environmentally friendly as well as economically viable and available for purchase today.

In 2021 in a Reuters interview, Piccard stated that his organization had assembled a portfolio of 910 vetted and labeled solutions and expected to reach 1000 by mid-April 2021. Piccard told Reuters he plans to discuss the solutions with businesses and governments, especially those in the process of funding the global economic recovery from COVID-19.

== Organisation ==
During their travel around the world, Borschberg and Piccard brought together about four hundred associations promoting renewable energy. As of June 2017, several multinational corporations are members of the Alliance, among which Solvay, historical partner of Solar Impulse, Air Liquide and Engie.

== See also ==
- International Council on Clean Transportation
