= Solar Impulse =

Long-range solar-powered aircraft

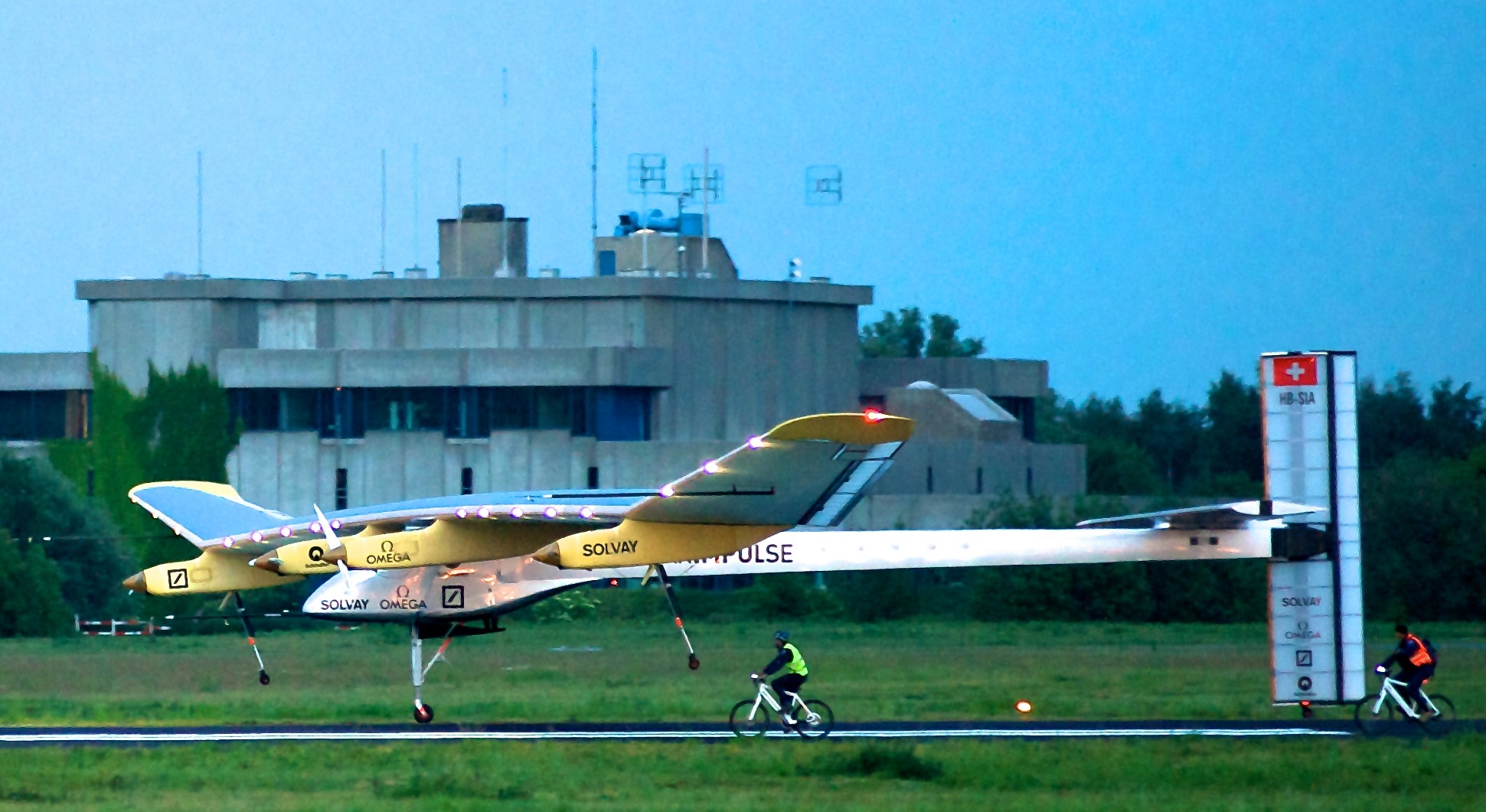
- Solar Impulse 1 landing at Brussels Airport after its first international flight on 13 May 2011

General information
- Type: Experimental solar-powered aircraft
- National origin: Switzerland
- Manufacturer: Solar Impulse
- Primary user: André Borschberg and Bertrand Piccard
- Number built: 2 (including prototype)

History
- Manufactured: 2009–present
- First flight: 3 December 2009

Solar Impulse is a Swiss long-range experimental solar-powered aircraft project, and also the name of the project's two operational aircraft. The privately financed project is led by Swiss engineer and businessman André Borschberg and Swiss psychiatrist and balloonist Bertrand Piccard, who co-piloted Breitling Orbiter 3, the first balloon to circle the world non-stop. The Solar Impulse project's goals were to make the first circumnavigation of the Earth by a piloted fixed-wing aircraft using only solar power and to bring attention to clean technologies.

The aircraft is a single-seated monoplane powered by photovoltaic cells; it is capable of taking off under its own power. The prototype, often referred to as Solar Impulse 1 (registration HB-SIA), was designed to remain airborne up to 36 hours. It conducted its first test flight in December 2009. In July 2010, it flew an entire diurnal solar cycle, including nearly nine hours of night flying, in a 26-hour flight. Piccard and Borschberg completed successful solar-powered flights from Switzerland to Spain and then Morocco in 2012, and conducted a multi-stage flight across the US in 2013.

A second aircraft, completed in 2014 and named Solar Impulse 2 (registration HB-SIB), carries more solar cells and more powerful motors, among other improvements. On 9 March 2015, Piccard and Borschberg began to circumnavigate the globe with Solar Impulse 2, departing from Abu Dhabi in the United Arab Emirates. The aircraft was scheduled to return to Abu Dhabi in August 2015 after a multi-stage journey around the world. By June 2015, the plane had traversed Asia, and in July 2015, it completed the longest leg of its journey, from Japan to Hawaii. During that leg, the aircraft's batteries sustained thermal damage and took months to replace.

A battery cooling system was installed and Solar Impulse 2 resumed the circumnavigation in April 2016, when it flew on to California. It continued across the US until it reached New York City in June 2016. Later that month, the aircraft crossed the Atlantic Ocean to Seville, Spain. It stopped in Egypt before returning to Abu Dhabi on 26 July 2016, more than 16 months after it had left (506 days), completing the approximately 42,000 km (26,000 mi) first circumnavigation of the Earth by a piloted fixed-wing aircraft using only solar power.

In 2019, Solar Impulse 2 was sold to Skydweller Aero, a US-Spanish company using the airframe to develop autonomous unmanned aerial vehicles capable of perpetual flight. In May 2026, it crashed in the Gulf of Mexico and was destroyed.

== Project development and funding ==
Bertrand Piccard initiated the Solar Impulse project in November 2003 after undertaking a feasibility study in partnership with the École Polytechnique Fédérale de Lausanne (EPFL). As a mechanical engineer, co-founder André Borschberg directed the construction of each aircraft and oversees the preparation of the flight missions. By 2009, they had assembled a multi-disciplinary team of 50 engineers and technical specialists from six countries, assisted by about 100 outside advisers and 80 technological partners.

The project is financed by a number of private companies and individuals, as well as receiving around CHF 6 million (US$6.4 million) in funding from the Swiss government. The project's private financial backers include Omega SA, Solvay, Schindler, ABB and Peter Diamandis. The EPFL, the European Space Agency and Dassault have provided technical expertise, while SunPower provided the aircraft's photovoltaic cells.

Piccard stated that the entire project from its beginnings in 2003 until mid-2015 had cost €150 million. It raised another €20 million in late 2015 to continue the round-the-world flight.

=== Timeline ===
- 2002: Feasibility study at the École Polytechnique Fédérale de Lausanne
- 2004–2005: Development of the concept
- 2006: Simulation of long-haul flights
- 2006–09: Construction of first prototype (HB-SIA; Solar Impulse 1)
- 2009: First flight of Solar Impulse 1
- 2009–11: Manned test flights
- 2011–12: Further test flights through Europe and North Africa
- 2011–13: Construction of second prototype (HB-SIB; Solar Impulse 2)
- 2013: Continental flight across the US by Solar Impulse 1
- 2014: First flight of Solar Impulse 2
- 2015–2016: Circumnavigation of the Earth by Solar Impulse 2, conducted in seventeen stages over 16-1/2 months

== Solar Impulse 1 (HB-SIA) ==
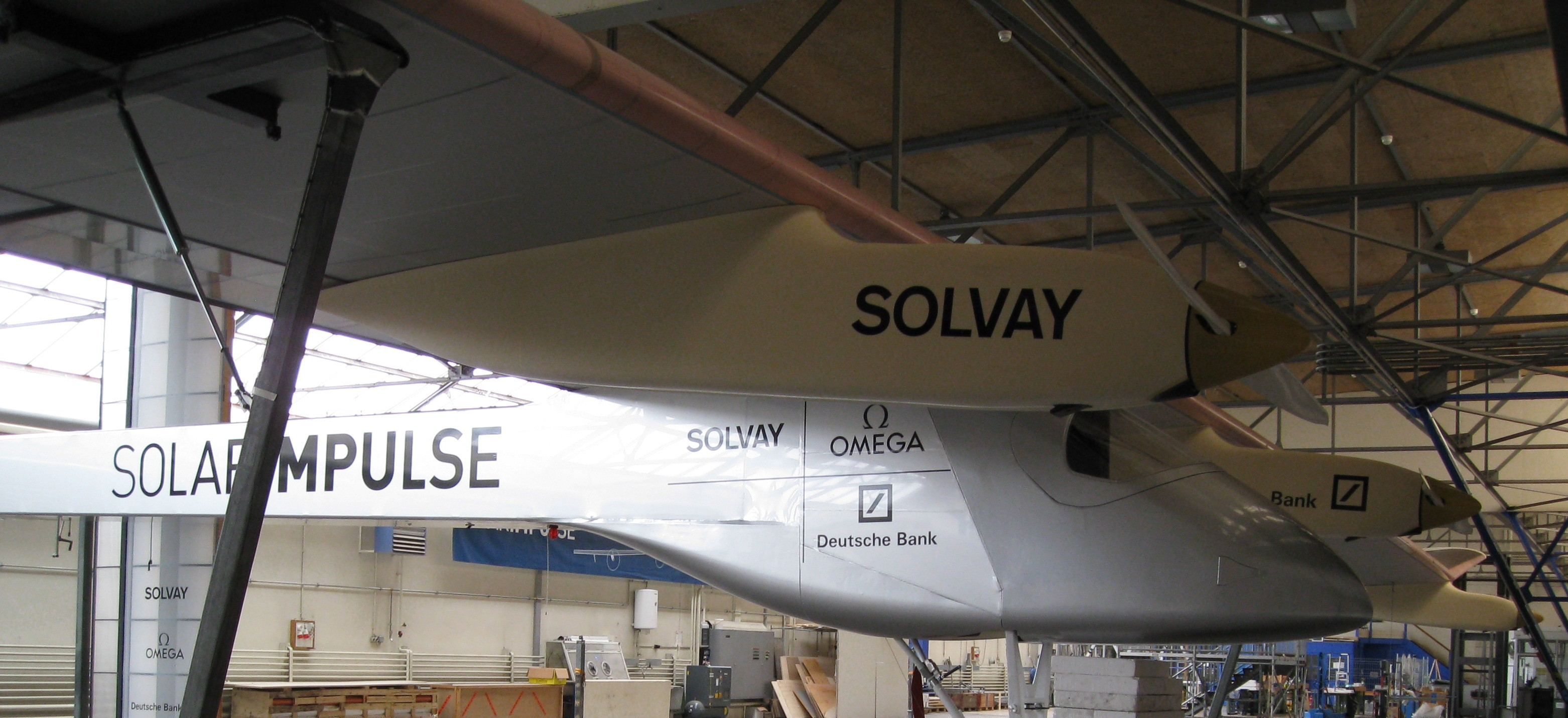
Solar Impulse 1 – fuselage and motors

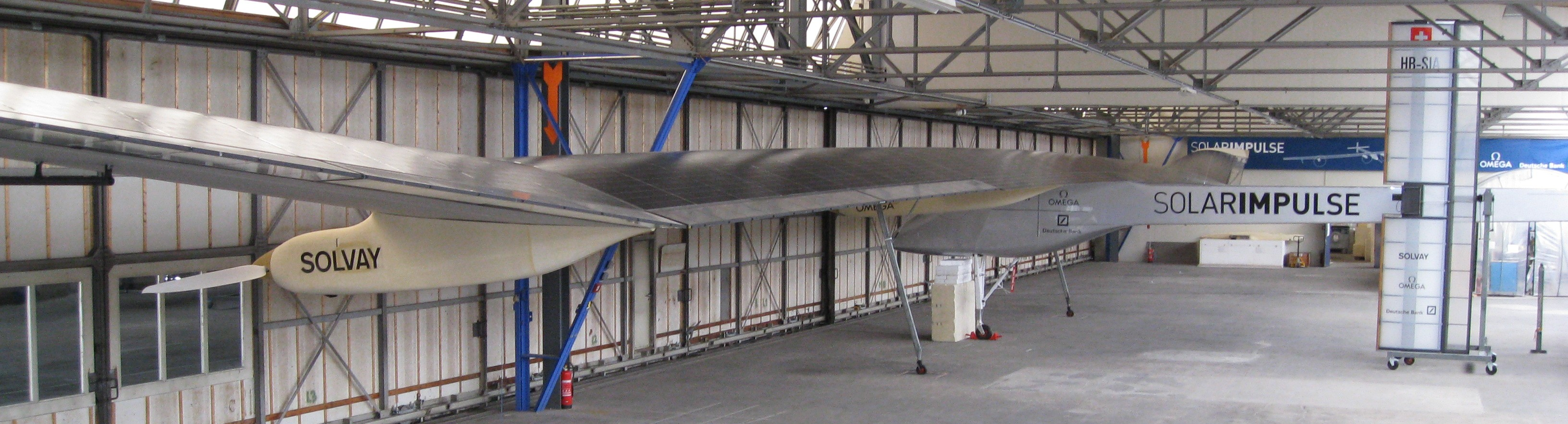
Solar Impulse 1 – wing structure

The first Solar Impulse aircraft, registered as HB-SIA, was primarily designed as a demonstration aircraft. It has a non-pressurized cockpit and a single wing with a wingspan similar to that of the Airbus A340 airliner. Under the wing are four nacelles, each with a set of lithium polymer batteries, a 7.5 kW (10 hp) electric motor and one twin-bladed propeller. To keep the wing as light as possible, a customised carbon fibre honeycomb sandwich structure was used. 11,628 photovoltaic cells on the upper wing surface and the horizontal stabilizer generate electricity during the day to power the electric motors and to charge the batteries allowing flight at night, theoretically enabling the single-seat plane to stay in the air indefinitely.

The aircraft's major design constraint is the capacity of the lithium polymer batteries. Over an optimum 24-hour cycle, the motors can deliver a combined average of about 6 kW (8 hp), roughly the power used by the Wright brothers' Flyer, the first successful powered aircraft, in 1903. In addition to the charge stored in its batteries, the aircraft uses the potential energy of height gained during the day to power its night flights.

=== Specifications ===
Data from Solar Impulse Project and Diaz

General characteristics

- Crew: 1
- Length: 21.85 m (71 ft 8 in)
- Wingspan: 63.4 m (208 ft 0 in)
- Height: 6.40 m (21 ft 0 in)
- Wing area: 200 m^{2} (2,200 sq ft) covered with 11,628 photovoltaic cells rated at 45 kW peak
- Aspect ratio: 19.7
- Gross weight: 1,600 kg (3,500 lb)
- Max takeoff weight: 2,000 kg (4,400 lb)
- Fuel capacity: 21 kW⋅h (76 MJ) lithium-ion battery
  Take-off speed: 35 km/h (22 mph)
- Powerplant: 4 × 7.5 kW (10 hp) electric motors
- Propellers: 2-bladed, 3.5 m (11 ft 0 in) diameter

Performance

- Cruise speed: 70 km/h (43 mph, 38 kn)
- Endurance: approximately 36 hours
- Service ceiling: 8,500 m (27,900 ft) with a maximum altitude of 12,000 m (39,000 ft)

=== Operational history ===
==== Maiden flight and other early flights ====
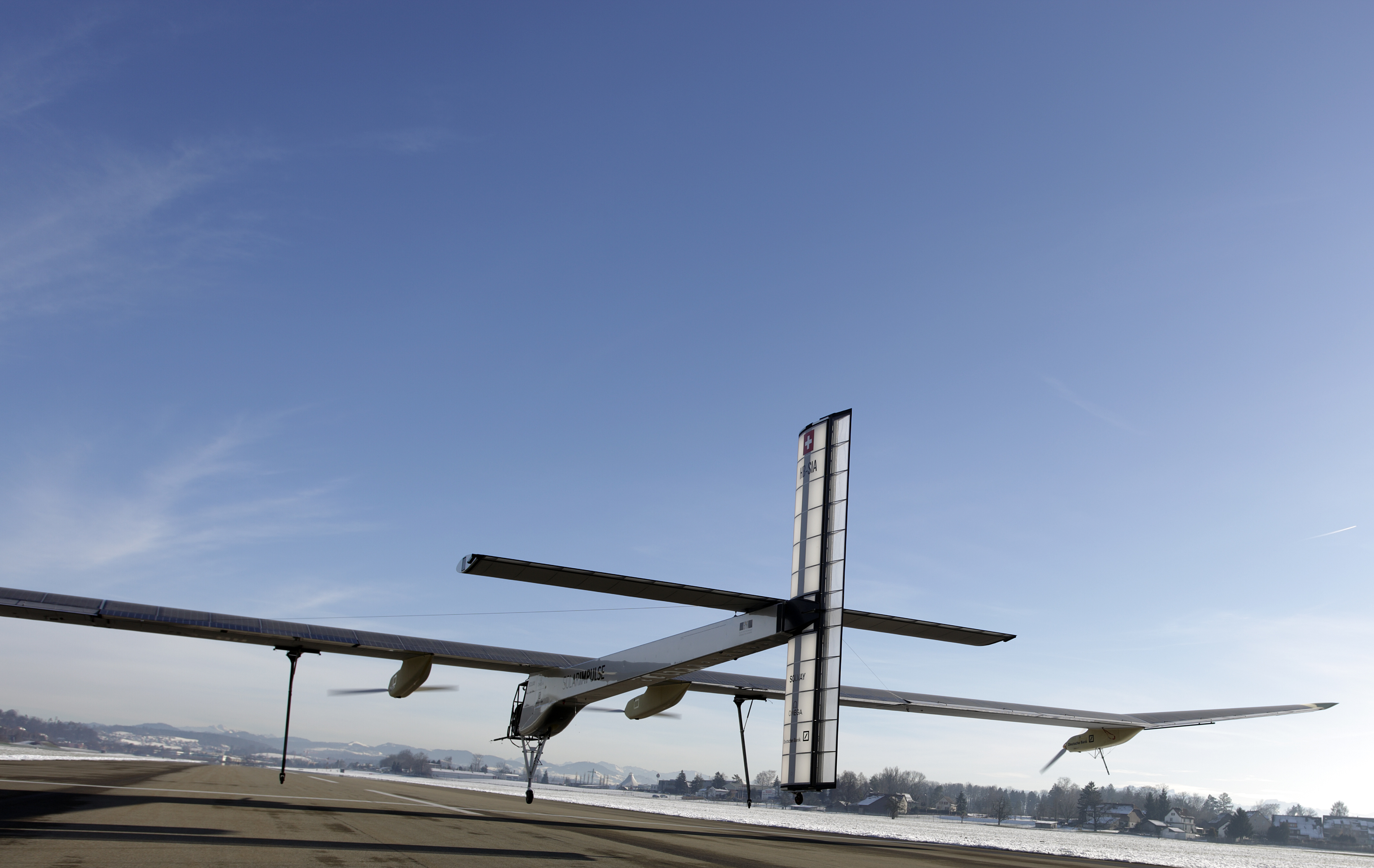
Solar Impulse 1 during its first "flea hop" test flight in Dübendorf on 3 December 2009

On 26 June 2009, Solar Impulse 1 was first presented to the public at the Dübendorf Air Base, Switzerland. Following taxi testing, a short-hop test flight was made on 3 December 2009, piloted by Markus Scherdel. Borschberg, co-leader of the project team, said of the flight:

"It was an unbelievable day. The airplane flew for about 350 metres (1,150 ft) and about 1 metre (3 ft 3 in) above the ground ... The aim was not to get high but to land on the same runway at a speed to test its controllability and get a first feeling of its flying characteristics ... the craft behaved just as the engineers had hoped. It is the end of the engineering phase and the start of the flight testing phase."

On 7 April 2010, the plane conducted an 87-minute test flight, piloted by Markus Scherdel. This flight reached an altitude of 1,200 m (3,937 ft). On 28 May 2010, the aircraft made its first flight powered entirely by solar energy, charging its batteries in flight.

==== First overnight flight ====
On 8 July 2010, Solar Impulse 1 achieved the world's first manned 26-hour solar-powered flight. The airplane was flown by Borschberg and took off at 06:51 Central European Summer Time (UTC+2) on 7 July from Payerne Air Base, Switzerland. It returned for a landing the following morning at 09:00 local time. During the flight, the plane reached a maximum altitude of 8,700 m (28,500 ft). At the time, the flight was the longest and highest ever flown by a manned solar-powered aircraft; these records were officially recognized by the Fédération Aéronautique Internationale (FAI) in October 2010.

==== International and intranational flights ====
===== Belgium and France (2011) =====
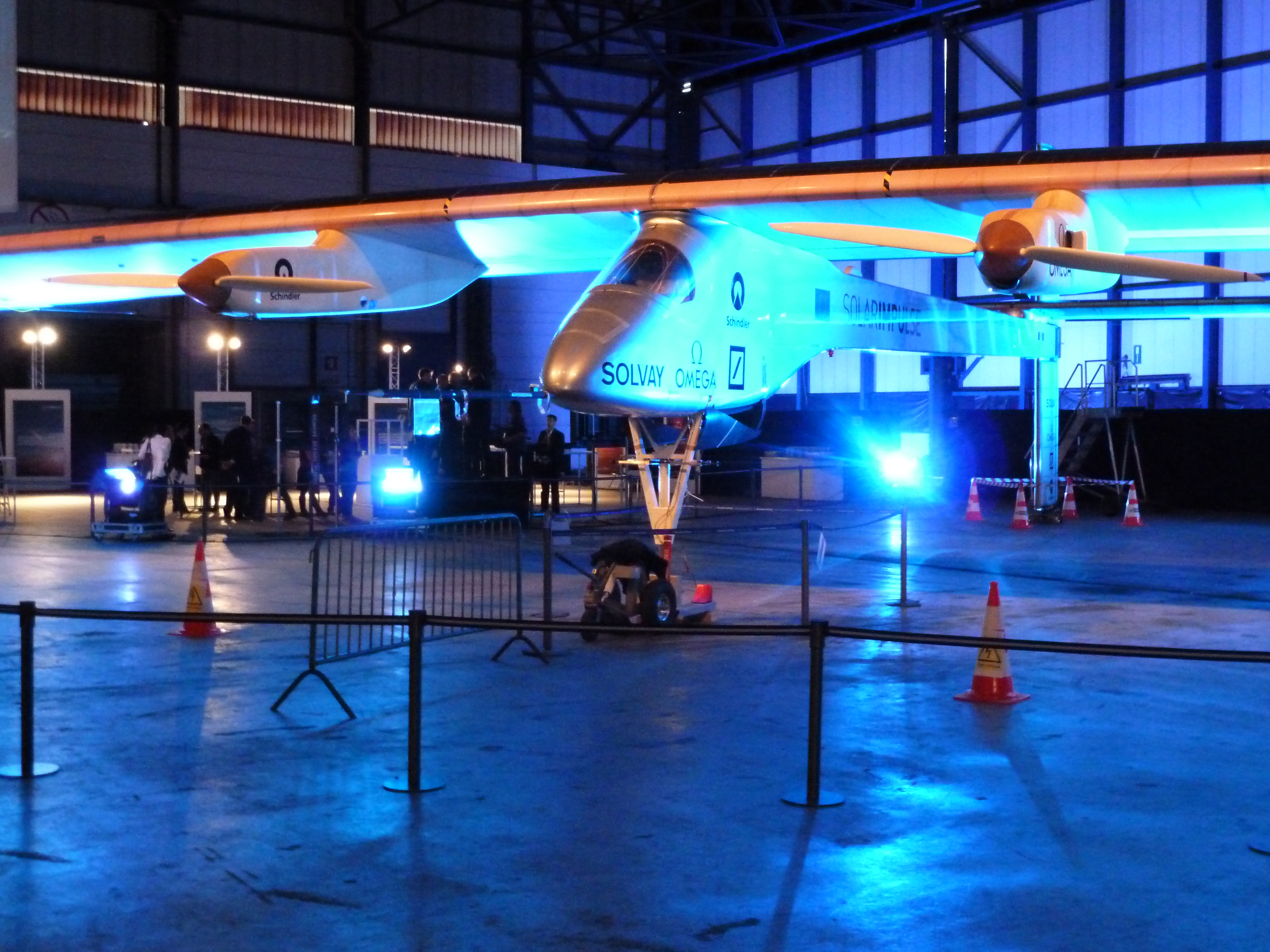
Solar Impulse 1 at Brussels Airport in May 2011

On 13 May 2011 at 21:30 local time, the plane landed at Brussels Airport, after completing a 13-hour flight from its home base in Switzerland. It was the first international flight by the Solar Impulse, which flew at an average altitude of 1,800 m (6,000 ft) for a distance of 630 km (391 mi), with an average speed of 50 km/h (31 mph). The aircraft's slow cruising speed required operating at a mid-altitude, allowing much faster air traffic to be routed around it. The aircraft was piloted by Borschberg. The project's other co-founder, Piccard, said in an interview after the landing: "Our goal is to create a revolution in the minds of people...to promote solar energies – not necessarily a revolution in aviation."

A second international flight to the Paris Air Show was attempted on 12 June 2011, but the plane turned back and returned to Brussels because of adverse weather conditions. In a second attempt on 14 June, Borschberg successfully landed the aircraft at Paris' Le Bourget Airport after a 16-hour flight.

===== First intercontinental flight (2012) =====
On 5 June 2012, the Solar Impulse successfully completed its first intercontinental flight, a 19-hour trip from Madrid, Spain, to Rabat, Morocco. During the first leg of the flight from Payerne Air Base to Madrid, the aircraft broke several further records for solar flight, including the longest solar-powered flight between pre-declared waypoints (1,099.3 km or 683 mi) and along a course (1,116 km or 693 mi).

===== United States (2013) =====
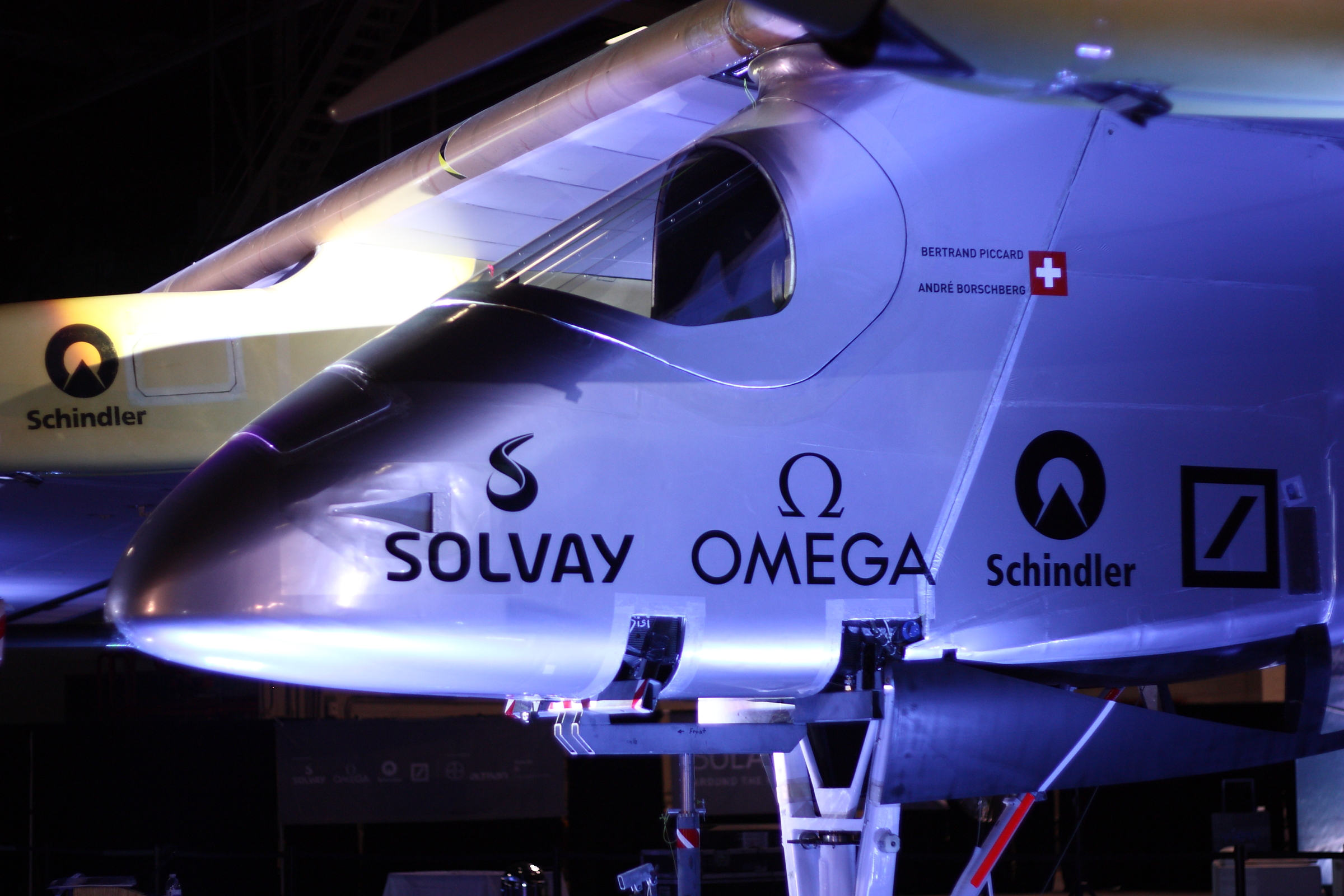
Solar Impulse 1 on display at John F. Kennedy International Airport, New York, on 14 July 2013

On 3 May 2013, the plane began its cross-US flight with a journey from Moffett Field in Mountain View, California, to Phoenix Goodyear Airport in Arizona. Successive legs of the flight ended at Dallas-Fort Worth airport, Lambert–St. Louis International Airport, Cincinnati Municipal Lunken Airport to change pilots and avoid strong winds, and Washington Dulles International Airport. On 6 July 2013, following a lengthy layover in Washington, Solar Impulse completed its cross-country journey, landing at New York City's JFK International Airport at 23:09 EDT. The landing occurred three hours earlier than originally intended, because a planned flyby of the Statue of Liberty was cancelled as a result of damage to the covering on the left wing.

Each flight leg took between 14 and 22 hours. The aircraft's second leg of its trip on 23 May to Dallas-Fort Worth covered 1,541 kilometres (958 mi) and set several new world distance records in solar aviation. Solar Impulse 1 was placed on public display at JFK after its landing. In August 2013, it was disassembled, then transported via a Cargolux B-747-400F to Dübendorf Air Base, where it was placed in storage in a hangar.

Detailed route

| Leg | Start | Stop | Origin | Destination | Distance | Flight time | Avg. speed | Pilot |
|---|---|---|---|---|---|---|---|---|
| 1 | 3 May 14:12 | 4 May 08:30 | Moffett Field, California (KNUQ) | Phoenix, Arizona (KGYR) | 984 km | 18 h 18 min | 53 km/h | Bertrand Piccard |
| 2 | 22 May 12:47 | 23 May 07:08 | Phoenix, Arizona (KGYR) | Dallas, Texas (KDFW) | 1541 km | 18 h 21 min | 84 km/h | André Borschberg |
| 3 | 3 Jun 10:06 | 4 Jun 07:28 | Dallas, Texas (KDFW) | Saint Louis, Missouri (KSTL) | 1040 km | 21 h 22 min | 49 km/h | Bertrand Piccard |
| 4 | 14 Jun 11:01 | 15 Jun 02:15 | Saint Louis, Missouri (KSTL) | Cincinnati, Ohio (KLUK) | | 15 h 14 min | | André Borschberg |
| 5 | 15 Jun 15:10 | 16 Jun 05:15 | Cincinnati, Ohio (KLUK) | Washington, DC (KIAD) | | 14 h 5 min | | Bertrand Piccard |
| 6 | 6 July 09:56 | 7 July 05:15 | Washington, DC (KIAD) | New York City, New York (KJFK) | | 19 h 19 min | | André Borschberg |

=== Aircraft on display ===
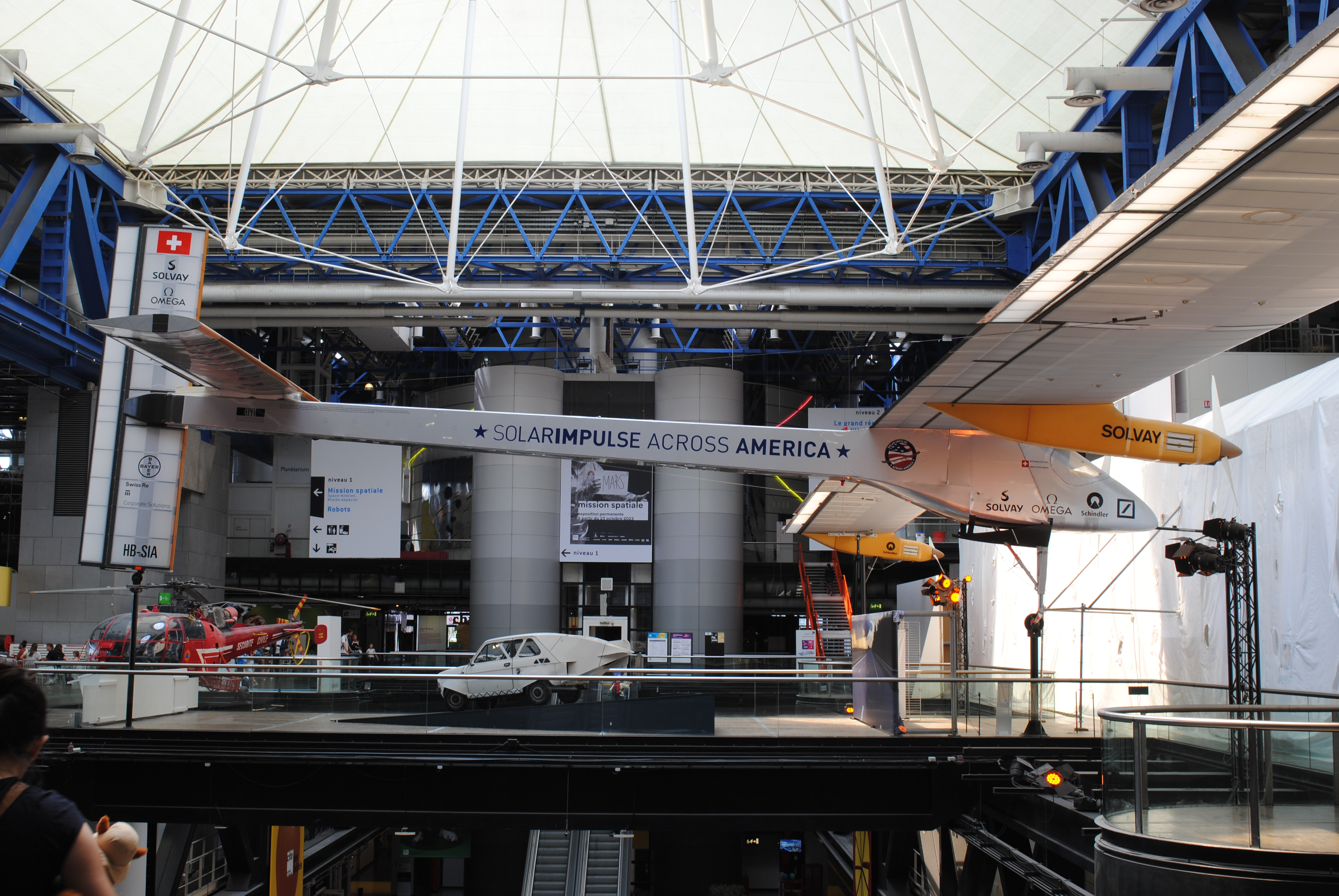
Solar Impulse 1 at the Cité des Sciences et de l'Industrie, Paris

In March 2015, the plane was transported by truck to Paris to be part of the permanent exhibition at Cité des Sciences et de l'Industrie.

== Solar Impulse 2 (HB-SIB) ==
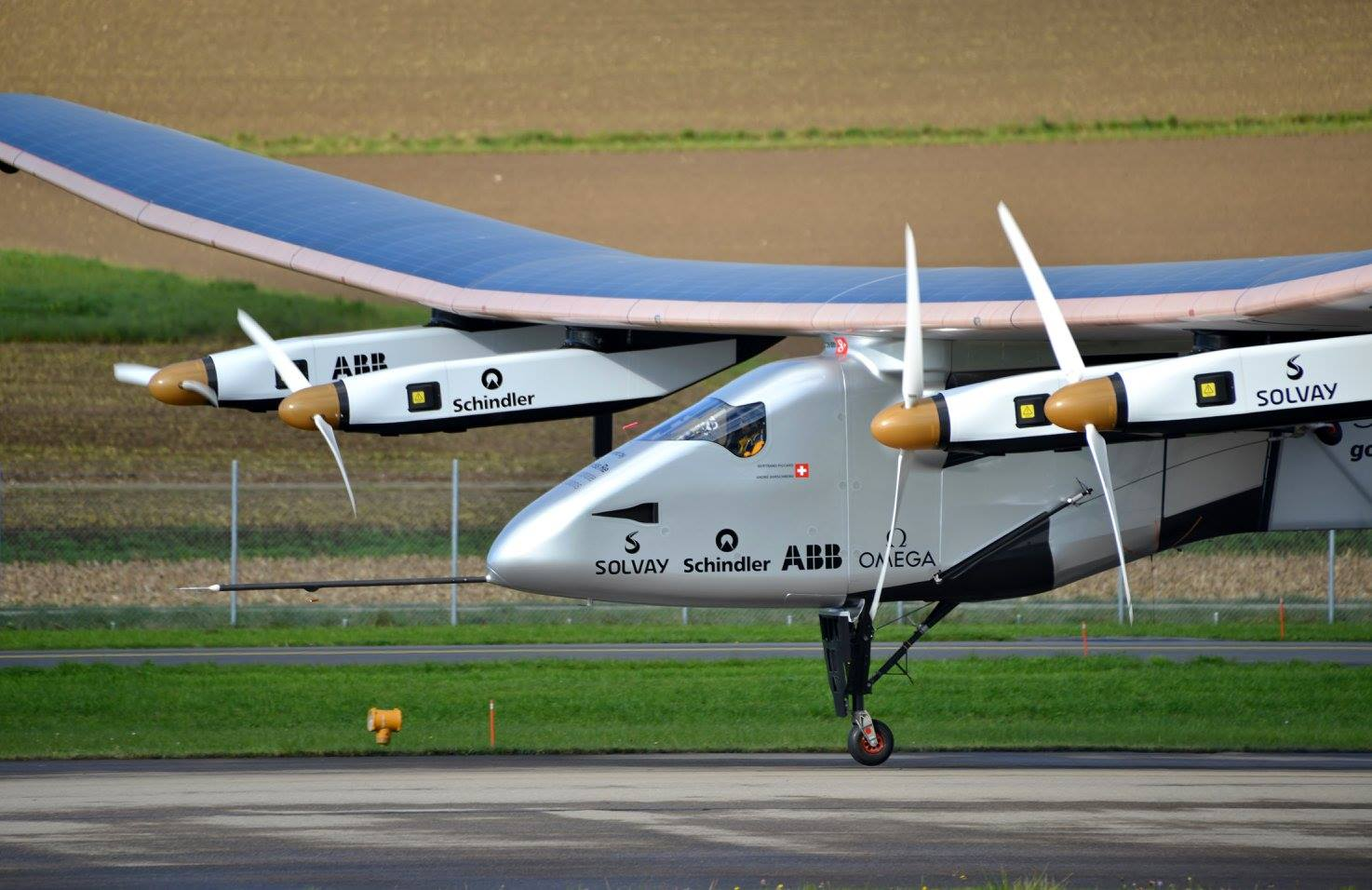
Solar Impulse 2 at the Payerne Air Base in November 2014

=== Construction history ===
Construction started in 2011 on the second aircraft, known as Solar Impulse 2, which carries the Swiss registration HB-SIB. Completion was initially planned for 2013, with a 25-day circumnavigation of the globe planned for 2014. A structural failure occurred on the aircraft's main spar during static tests in July 2012, leading to delays in the flight testing schedule to allow repairs. Solar Impulse 2's first flight took place at Payerne Air Base on 2 June 2014.

=== Design ===
The wingspan of Solar Impulse 2 is 71.9 m (236 ft), slightly less than that of an Airbus A380, the world's largest passenger airliner, but compared with the 500-tonne A380, the carbon-fibre Solar Impulse weighs only about 2.3 tonnes (5,100 lb), little more than an average SUV. It features a non-pressurized cockpit 3.8 cubic metres (130 cu ft) in size and advanced avionics, including limited functionality of an autopilot that allows the pilot to sleep for up to 20 minutes at a time, enabling multi-day transcontinental and trans-oceanic flights. Supplemental oxygen and various other environmental support systems allow the pilot to cruise up to an altitude of 12,000 metres (39,000 ft).

=== Specifications ===
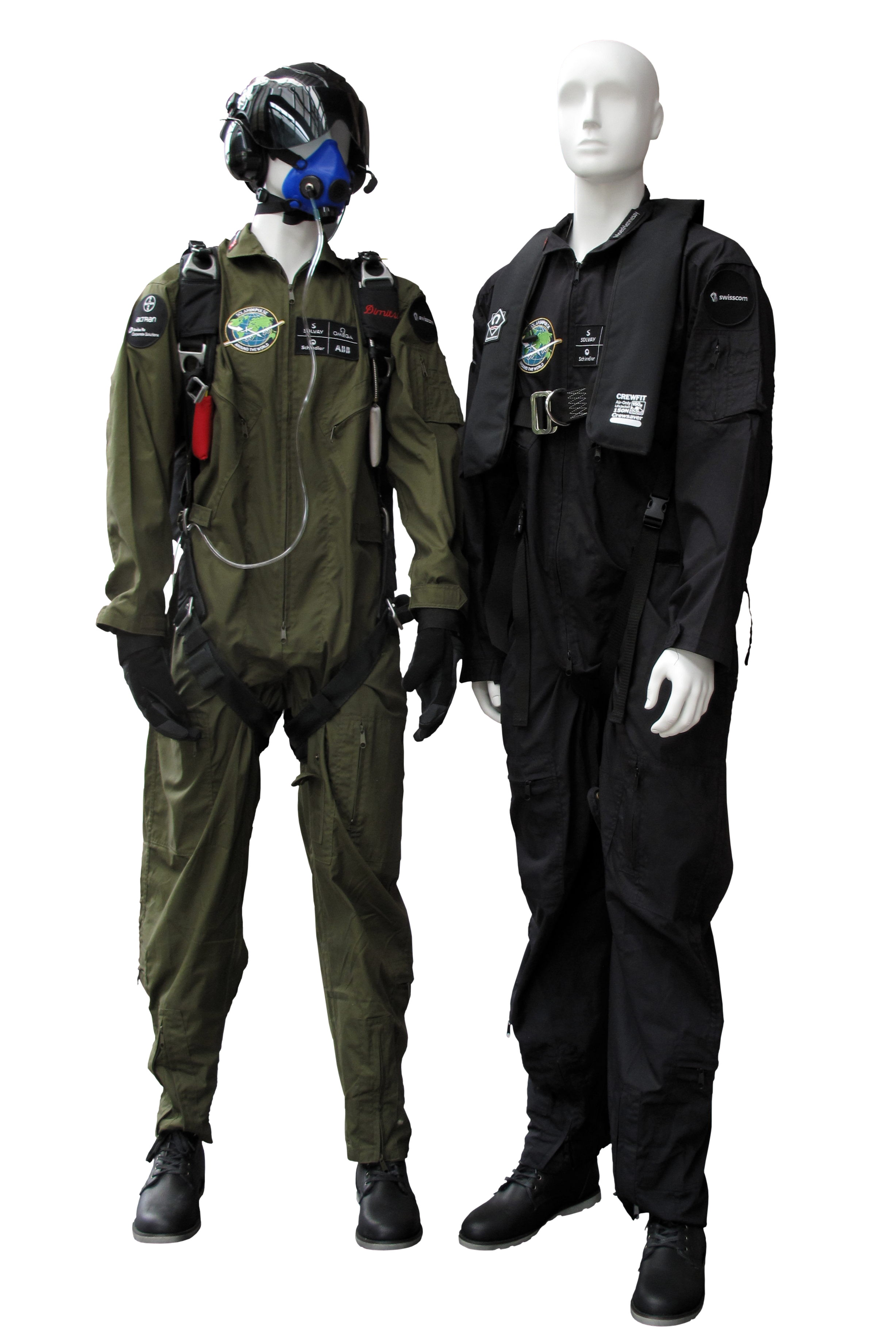
Flight suits worn on Solar Impulse

Data from Solar Impulse Project

General characteristics

- Crew: 1
- Length: 22.4 m (73 ft 6 in)
- Wingspan: 71.9 m (236 ft 0 in)
- Height: 6.37 m (20 ft 11 in)
- Gross weight: 2,300 kg (5,100 lb)
- Take-off speed: 36 km/h (22.4 mph)
- Wing area: 17,248 photovoltaic solar cells cover the top of the wings, fuselage and tailplane for a total area of 269.5 m^{2} (2,901 sq ft) (rated at 66 kW peak)
- Powerplant: 4 × electric motors with 4 x 41 kW⋅h (150 MJ) lithium-ion batteries (633 kg or 1,396 lb), providing , 13.0 kW (17.4 hp) each
- Propellers: 4.0 m (13 ft 1 in) diameter

Performance

- Maximum speed: 140 km/h (87 mph, 76 kn)
- Cruise speed: 90 km/h (56 mph, 49 kn) 60 km/h (37 mph) at night to save power
- Service ceiling: 8,500 m (27,900 ft) with a maximum altitude of 12,000 m (39,000 ft)

=== Operational history ===
Solar Impulse 2 was first publicly displayed on 9 April 2014. Its inaugural flight took place on 2 June 2014, piloted by Markus Scherdel. The aircraft averaged a ground speed of 30 knots (56 km/h), and reached an altitude of 1,700 metres (5,500 ft). The first night flight was completed on 26 October 2014, and the aircraft reached its maximum altitude during a flight on 28 October 2014.

=== 2015–16 circumnavigation of the Earth ===
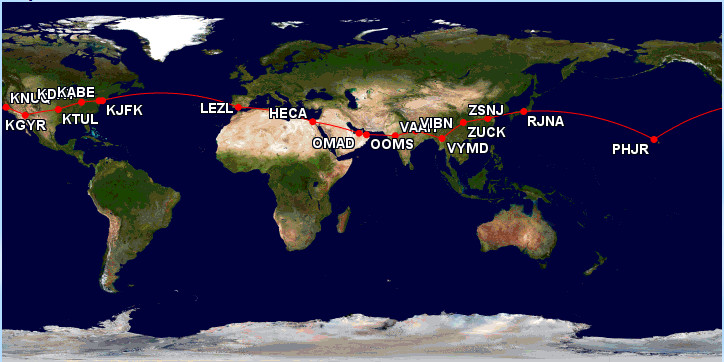
Circumnavigation route of Solar Impulse 2

The repair work to the aircraft's main spar delayed Solar Impulse 2's circumnavigation of the Earth from 2012 to 2015. The aircraft was delivered to Masdar City in Abu Dhabi for the World Future Energy Summit in late January 2015, and it began the journey from Al Bateen Executive Airport on 9 March 2015. It was scheduled to return to the same location in August 2015. A mission control centre for the circumnavigation was established in Monaco, using satellite links to gather real-time flight telemetry and remain in constant contact with the aircraft and the support team. The route followed by Solar Impulse 2 was entirely in the Northern Hemisphere. It left Abu Dhabi, then it headed east to nearby Oman and India. Twelve stops were originally planned along the route, with pilots Borschberg and Piccard alternating; at each stop, the crew awaited good weather conditions along the next leg of the route. For most of its time airborne, Solar Impulse 2 cruised at a ground speed of between 50 and 100 kilometres per hour (31 and 62 mph), usually at the slower end of that range at night to save power. Legs of the flight crossing the Pacific and Atlantic oceans were the longest stages of the circumnavigation, taking up to five days and nights. On multi-day flights, the pilots took 20-minute naps and used yoga or other exercises to promote blood flow and maintain alertness.

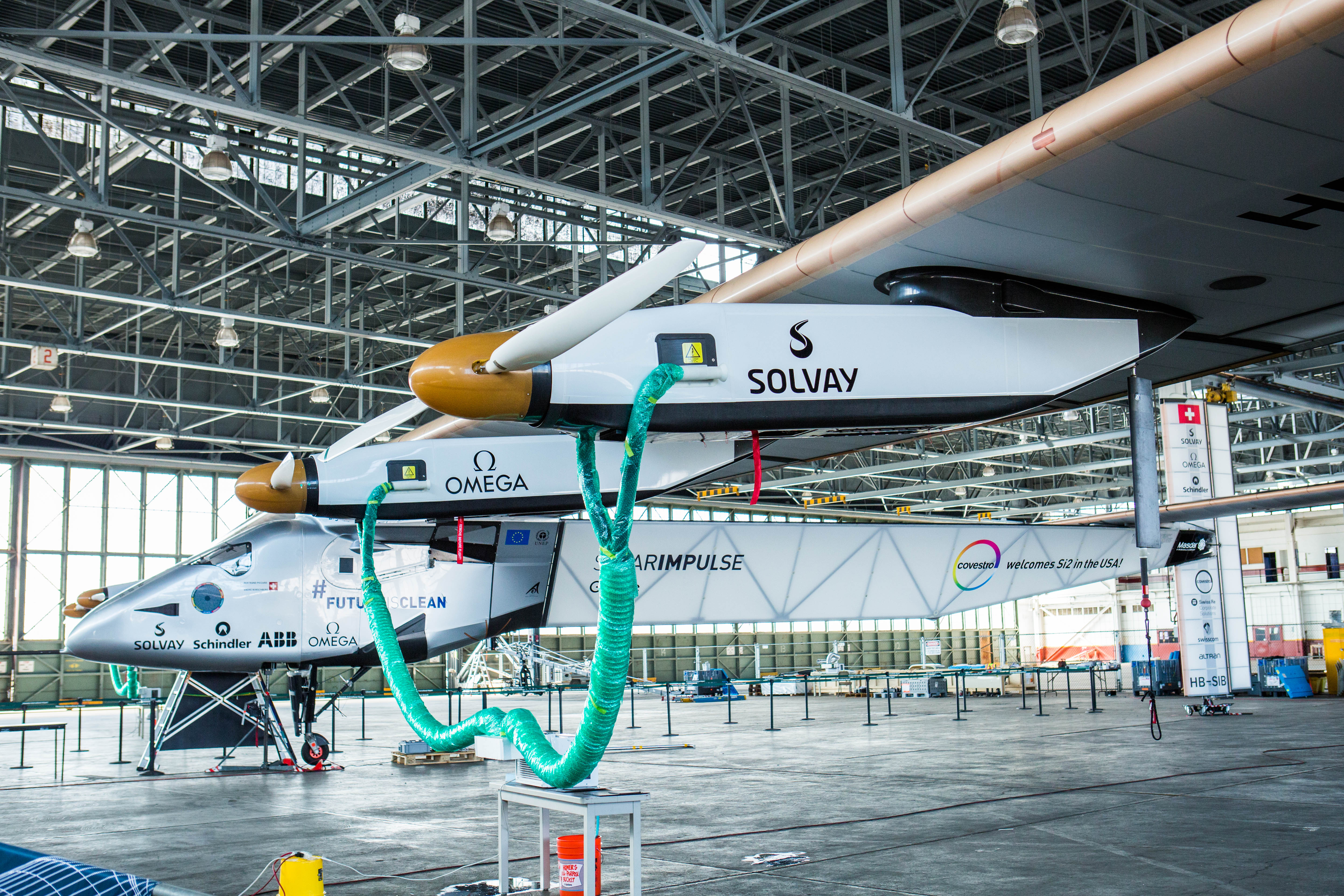
Solar Impulse 2 in its hangar in Hawaii, 2016

By the end of May 2015, the plane had traversed Asia. It made an unscheduled stop in Japan to await favourable weather over the Pacific, increasing the expected number of legs of the journey to 13. The aircraft began the flight from Japan to Hawaii on 28 June 2015 (29 June, Japan local time). With Borschberg in the cockpit, it reached Hawaii on 3 July, setting new records for the world's longest solar-powered flight both by time (117 hours, 52 minutes) and distance (7,212 km; 4,481 mi). The flight's duration was also a record for longest solo flight, by time, for any aircraft. During that leg the plane's batteries were damaged by overheating because they were packed in too much insulation. New parts had to be ordered, and as it was late in the season, with days shortening in the northern hemisphere, the plane was grounded in Hawaii. The US Department of Transportation stored the aircraft in a hangar at Kalaeloa Airport on Oahu. New batteries were made and installed in the plane. Test flights began in February 2016 to prepare for resumption of the circumnavigation once northern hemisphere days lengthened enough to permit multi-day solar-powered flights. A favourable weather window opened in April 2016, and the plane resumed its journey, landing at Moffett Field, in California, on 23 April. During that flight, Piccard, via a live videolink, spoke with Ban Ki-moon and Doris Leuthard before the General Assembly of the United Nations, from the cockpit of Solar Impulse 2, commenting on that day's historic signing of the Paris Agreement and discussing how using clean technologies can create jobs and fight global warming. Additional legs of the flight were added in the US as Solar Impulse 2 flew to Phoenix, Arizona, Tulsa, Oklahoma, Dayton, Ohio, Lehigh Valley, Pennsylvania and New York City, arriving there on 11 June 2016. Piccard piloted the aircraft across the Atlantic Ocean, arriving in Seville, Spain, on 23 June. The aircraft next stopped in Cairo, Egypt, on 13 July, and landed in Abu Dhabi on 26 July, completing the around-the-world trip in a total of 17 stages and 16-1/2 months; it was the first circumnavigation of the Earth by a piloted fixed-wing aircraft using only solar power.

==== Detailed route ====
| Leg | Start | Origin | Destination | Flight time | Distance | Avg. speed | Max. altitude | Pilot |
|---|---|---|---|---|---|---|---|---|
| 1 | 9 March 2015 03:12 | (United Arab Emirates) Abu Dhabi, UAE (OMAD) | Muscat, Oman (OOMS) | 13 h 1 min | 417 nmi (772 km) | 32.0 kn (59.2 km/h) | 20,942 ft (6,383 m) | A. Borschberg |
| 2 | 10 March 02:35 | Muscat, Oman (OOMS) | Ahmedabad, India (VAAH) | 15 h 20 min | 860 nmi (1,593 km) | 56.1 kn (103.9 km/h) | 29,114 ft (8,874 m) | B. Piccard |
| 3 | 18 March 01:48 | Ahmedabad, India (VAAH) | Varanasi, India (VEBN) | 13 h 15 min | 630 nmi (1,170 km) | 47.7 kn (88.3 km/h) | 17,001 ft (5,182 m) | Borschberg |
| 4 | 18 March 23:52 | Varanasi, India (VEBN) | Mandalay, Myanmar (VYMD) | 13 h 29 min | 829 nmi (1,536 km) | 61.5 kn (113.9 km/h) | 27,000 ft (8,230 m) | Piccard |
| 5 | 29 March 21:06 | Mandalay, Myanmar (VYMD) | Chongqing, China (ZUCK) | 20 h 29 min | 883 nmi (1,636 km) | 43.1 kn (79.9 km/h) | 28,327 ft (8,634 m) | Piccard |
| 6 | 20 April 22:06 | Chongqing, China (ZUCK) | Nanjing, China (ZSNJ) | 17 h 22 min | 747 nmi (1,384 km) | 43.0 kn (79.7 km/h) | 14,010 ft (4,270 m) | Piccard |
| 7 | 30 May 18:39 | Nanjing, China (ZSNJ) | (Japan) Nagoya, Japan^{N1} (RJNA) | 44 h 9 min | 1,589 nmi (2,942 km) | 36.0 kn (66.6 km/h) | 28,327 ft (8,634 m) | Borschberg |
| 8 | 28 June 18:03 | Nagoya, Japan (RJNA) | (United States) Kalaeloa, Hawaii, US (PHJR) | 117 h 52 min | 4,819 nmi (8,924 km) | 40.9 kn (75.7 km/h) | 28,327 ft (8,634 m) | Borschberg |
| 9 | 21 April 2016 16:15 | (United States) Kalaeloa, Hawaii, US (PHJR) | (United States) Mountain View, CA, US (KNUQ) | 62 h 29 min | 2,206 nmi (4,086 km) | 35.3 kn (65.4 km/h) | 28,327 ft (8,634 m) | Piccard |
| 10 | 2 May 12:03 | (United States) Mountain View, CA, US (KNUQ) | (United States) Phoenix, AZ, US (KGYR) | 15 h 52 min | 601 nmi (1,113 km) | 37.9 kn (70.2 km/h) | 22,001 ft (6,706 m) | Borschberg |
| 11 | 12 May 11:05 | (United States) Phoenix, AZ, US (KGYR) | (United States) Tulsa, OK, US (KTUL) | 18 h 10 min | 850 nmi (1,570 km) | 46.7 kn (86.4 km/h) | 22,001 ft (6,706 m) | Piccard |
| 12 | 21 May 09:22 | (United States) Tulsa, OK, US (KTUL) | (United States) Dayton, OH, US (KDAY) | 16 h 34 min | 647 nmi (1,199 km) | 39.1 kn (72.4 km/h) | 21,001 ft (6,401 m) | Borschberg |
| 13 | 25 May 08:02 | (United States) Dayton, OH, US (KDAY) | (United States) Lehigh Valley, PA, US (KABE) | 16 h 49 min | 564 nmi (1,044 km) | 33.6 kn (62.2 km/h) | 15,000 ft (4,572 m) | Piccard |
| 14 | 11 June 03:18 | (United States) Lehigh Valley, PA, US (KABE) | (United States) New York, NY, US (KJFK) | 4 h 41 min | 143 nmi (265 km) | 30.6 kn (56.6 km/h) | 3,002 ft (915 m) | Borschberg |
| 15 | 20 June 06:30 | (United States) New York, NY, US (KJFK) | Seville, Spain (LEZL) | 71 h 8 min | 3,653 nmi (6,765 km) | 50.9 kn (94.3 km/h) | 27,999 ft (8,534 m) | Piccard |
| 16 | 11 July 04:20 | Seville, Spain (LEZL) | Cairo, Egypt (HECA) | 48 h 50 min | 2,022 nmi (3,745 km) | 41.4 kn (76.7 km/h) | 27,999 ft (8,534 m) | Borschberg |
| 17 | 23 July 2016 23:28 | Cairo, Egypt (HECA) | (United Arab Emirates) Abu Dhabi, UAE (OMAD) | 48 h 37 min | 1,455 nmi (2,694 km) | 29.9 kn (55.4 km/h) | 27,999 ft (8,534 m) | Piccard |
| Total | | | | 558 h 7 min (23.25 d) | 22,915 nmi (42,438 km) | 41.0 kn (76.0 km/h) | 29,114 ft (8,874 m) | |

Notes:

- ^N1 — Leg 7 was planned as a 144-hour flight from Nanjing, China to Hawaii (4,931 nmi or 9,132 km). Deteriorating weather forced a diversion to Nagoya, Japan.

=== Skydweller Aero ===
In September 2019 Solar Impulse 2 was sold to Skydweller Aero, a Spanish-American company that was developing autonomous unmanned aerial vehicles capable of continuous flight and "carrying radar, electronic optics, telecommunications devices, telephone listening and interception systems". As part of this sale, the aircraft was transferred from Switzerland to Spain. In February 2023, Skydweller Aero conducted its first autonomous flight in Spain before transferring the aircraft to southern Mississippi in 2024, where it conducted the world's first uncrewed autonomous flight of a solar aircraft. The company intends to build a fleet of aircraft to operate year-round in latitudes between Miami (26°N) and Rio de Janeiro (23°S). Uncrewed and autonomous, these aircraft are expected to be able to perform military missions and commercial tasks unachievable by manned aircraft and at lower cost than satellites.

In 2024, Skydweller Aero announced plans to fly an aircraft nonstop around the world and eventually to return Solar Impulse 2 for permanent display at the Swiss Museum of Transport.

On 4 May 2026, Solar Impulse 2, by then re-registered as N247PF, crashed in the Gulf of Mexico due to a loss of power after 192-hours and 14-minutes of continuous autonomous flight and was destroyed. No one was on board.

== Honours ==
In 2015, Swissmint issued a special commemorative coin in anticipation of the Earth circumnavigation mission.

In 2016, the Swiss Post edited a special stamp to honour the achievement of Solar Impulse 2.

== See also ==
- Electric aircraft
- List of circumnavigations
- Solar vehicle
- Renewable energy by country
- PlanetSolar, first solar vehicle (boat) to circumnavigate the Earth
- World Alliance for Clean Technologies

Other solar aircraft

- Gossamer Penguin
- Helios Prototype
- Qinetiq Zephyr
- Solar Challenger
- SolarStratos

Records

- Flight endurance record
- List of firsts in aviation
