= ATG =

ATG may refer to:

== Companies ==
- ATG Stores, an e-tail site
- Advanced Technology Group (Apple), a former division of Apple Computer
- Advanced Technology Group (Novell), a former division of Novell
- Aviation Technology Group, the defunct developer of the Javelin Very Light Jet (VLJ)
- Auction Technology Group, a digital marketplace company formerly known as ATG Media

== Military ==
- Alaska Territorial Guard, a military reserve force in World War II
- Anti-tank gun, a mobile weapon used in Anti-tank warfare

== Organizations ==
- Alternative Tourism Group, a Palestinian NGO
- Ambassador Theatre Group, a theatre group in the UK

== Science ==
- ATG, a three-base sequence of DNA in the genetic code representing a start codon and/or methionine
- Anti-thymocyte globulin, antibodies to prevent and treat transplant rejection
- ATG is short for "autophagy-related", which can apply to either genes or proteins

== Other uses ==
- Ankara Tren Garı, a mixed use building in Ankara, Turkey
- Anti Tank Guitar, a string instrument
- Art Technology Group, a software developer
- Art Theatre Guild, a Japanese film production company
- Auto-gating, in night vision devices
- Automatic Tank Gauging
- The ISO 3166 code for Antigua and Barbuda, a country in the east Caribbean Sea
