= IABG =

German analysis and test engineering company

- Native name: Industrieanlagen-Betriebsgesellschaft mbH
- Type: GmbH (Limited liability company)
- Industry: Aerospace, Automotive, Defense, Infocom, Security
- Headquarters: Taufkirchen, Germany
- Net income: €215.4 million (2019)
- Owner: Rudolf F. Schwarz
- Number of employees: approx. 1000 (2019)
- Subsidiaries: Acentiss GmbH; Alawe Vermietungs GmbH & Co KG; BIGS gGmbH; B.I.M. GmbH; European Test Services B.V. (ETS); EXTEDO GmbH; IABG Innovationen GmbH; IABG Grundbesitz GmbH; INTIS GmbH; MEADSLLC; VITES GmbH
- Website: www.iabg.de

IABG (Industrieanlagen-Betriebsgesellschaft mbH) is a German analysis and test engineering company based in Taufkirchen near Munich.

== History ==
The company was founded in 1961 on the initiative of the federal government as a central analysis and testing facility for the Federal Ministry of Defence and the aeronautical industry. In 1993, the company was privatized and is now run by its owners. Up to January 1 of 2010, SCHWARZ Holding GmbH (87.4% of the share capital) together with IABG Mitarbeiterbeteiligungs AG (MBAG, 12.6% of the share capital) form the IABG shareholder group. In 2019 IABG employed around 1,000 employees at 12 German and international locations.

Projects

In 1993, IABG started the first large-scale project with the total-cycle fatigue test on the first Airbus model, the Airbus A300. In 1992 major tests began on the European rocket Ariane 5. One of the best-known projects is the total fatigue test on the Airbus A380, which was carried out by the IABG from 2004 to 2012 at Dresden. At the beginning of 2014 IABG started the continuous test operation at its location in Erding on the Airbus A350 XWB EW (EW = Extra Wing).

== Business areas ==
=== Aeronautics ===
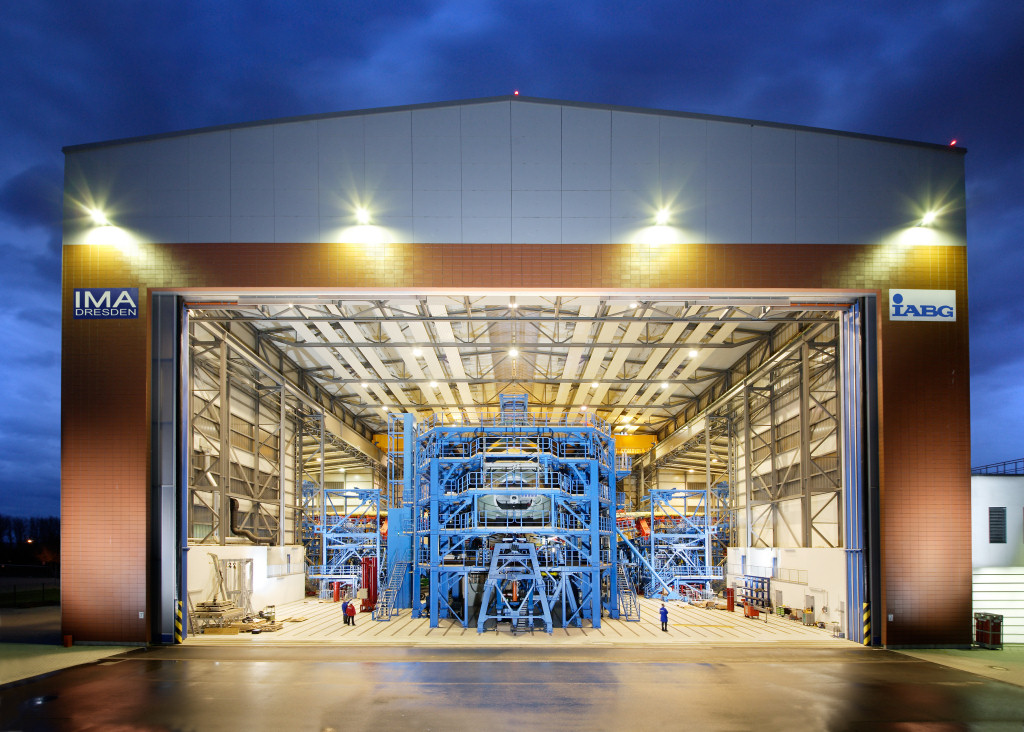
Fatigue test of the Airbus A380 in Dresden

The company tests aircraft and individual assemblies for their strength and durability. This includes life and safety analyses, test concepts and programs, test simulation, static load tests, operational strength tests on entire skin and substructures, material testing and nondestructive testing. Important projects are the structural fatigue test on the Airbus A380 (finished 2012), the fatigue test on the overall structure of the Airbus A400M military transport, the life extension tests on the Airbus A320 as well as the structural fatigue tests on the Airbus A350 XWB.

=== Automotive ===
In the Automotive industry, the company offers test and development services for automotive manufacturers and suppliers. For this purpose, IABG operates an accredited test center according to current standards. The portfolio also includes the development and construction of test benches.

=== Defense & Security ===
In Defense & Security, the company supports the armed forces and their acquisition projects. These include solutions for protection and security issues, prevention and response to threats such as cyber-terrorism and critical infrastructure attacks.

=== Infocom ===
The Infocom business unit was created in 1989. IABG plans, integrates and operates complex information technology and communication systems up to the introduction and maintenance during their life cycle. The service portfolio includes safety concepts and cost models for optimizing the security and cost-effectiveness of IT systems. Prior to its privatization, the company was involved in the development of three former German standard Information security projects. These include the IT Security Criteria (ITSK), the IT Evaluation Guide (ITEHB), and the IT Security Guide (ITSHB). The works appeared in 1989, 1990 and 1992. Among the successors of these works are the Common Criteria (published in 1996) and the IT basic protection manual published in 1994.

=== Mobility, energy & environment ===
In the Mobility business segment, the company carries out vehicle and traffic engineering, driving dynamics, driving comfort among others. The portfolio includes calculations on strength, dynamics and acoustics as well as structural tests on overall structures and components. Furthermore, the IABG examines the possibilities of transferring the magnetic levitation for individual traffic. In the energy business segment, solutions for electromobility and energy supplies are offered. The focus here is on the dismantling of nuclear power plants and the retrofitting of nuclear facilities as well as the qualification and engineering of wind power plants. In the environmental business area, the company focuses on geodata and environmental engineering. In its geodata factory in Dresden, IABG calculates and interprets spatial data, e.g. for surveying flooding areas, mobile radio planning or for municipal cadastres.

=== Space travel ===
The company carries out qualification tests on carrier rockets, such as the Ariane 5 upper stage and Vega, on satellites such as Swarm, LISA Pathfinder and Sentinel-2A, as well as other space structures in its space center coordinated by the ESA. These include mechanical, thermal and acoustic tests, the determination of mass properties as well as support services in engineering and quality management.

== Subsidiaries ==
- Acentiss (2008)
- Alawe Vermietungs
- BIGS (2010)
- B.I.M.
- European Test Services B.V. (ETS) (2000)
- EXTEDO (1996)
- IABG Grundbesitz
- IABG Innovationen
- INTIS (2011)
- MEADS LLC
- VITES (2014)

=== Acentiss ===
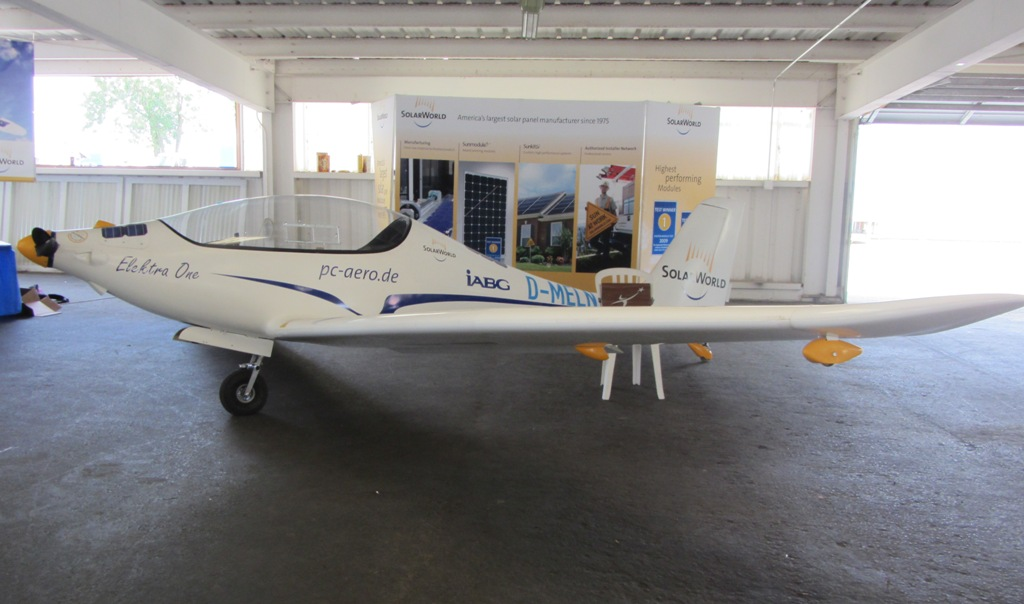
PC-Aero Elektra One

Acentiss is subsidiary of IABG founded in 2008. They offer engineering services and develop the Elias aircraft (ELectric aircraft IABG AcentisS), a modified version of the PC-Aero Elektra One, presented in the ILA Berlin Air Show 2012 . Up to 2013, the aircraft is used in the bavarian research projects EUROPAS (2013-2016) and AURAIS (2017-2019). In Elias aircraft was designed a new structure of the wings and the landing gear, and it was developed the full electric reconnaissance system, datalinks, and ground control station.

Acentiss collaborated in the construction of the rope-free elevator MULTI of ThyssenKrupp, winner of the German Design Award in 2018.

Acentiss with the company HTM/Intercopter created a joint venture in 2018 called Advanced Aerospace Developments, which holds the EASA Part21J certification. One project is an external mirror system for the helicopter AS350 in external load operation.

=== BIGS ===
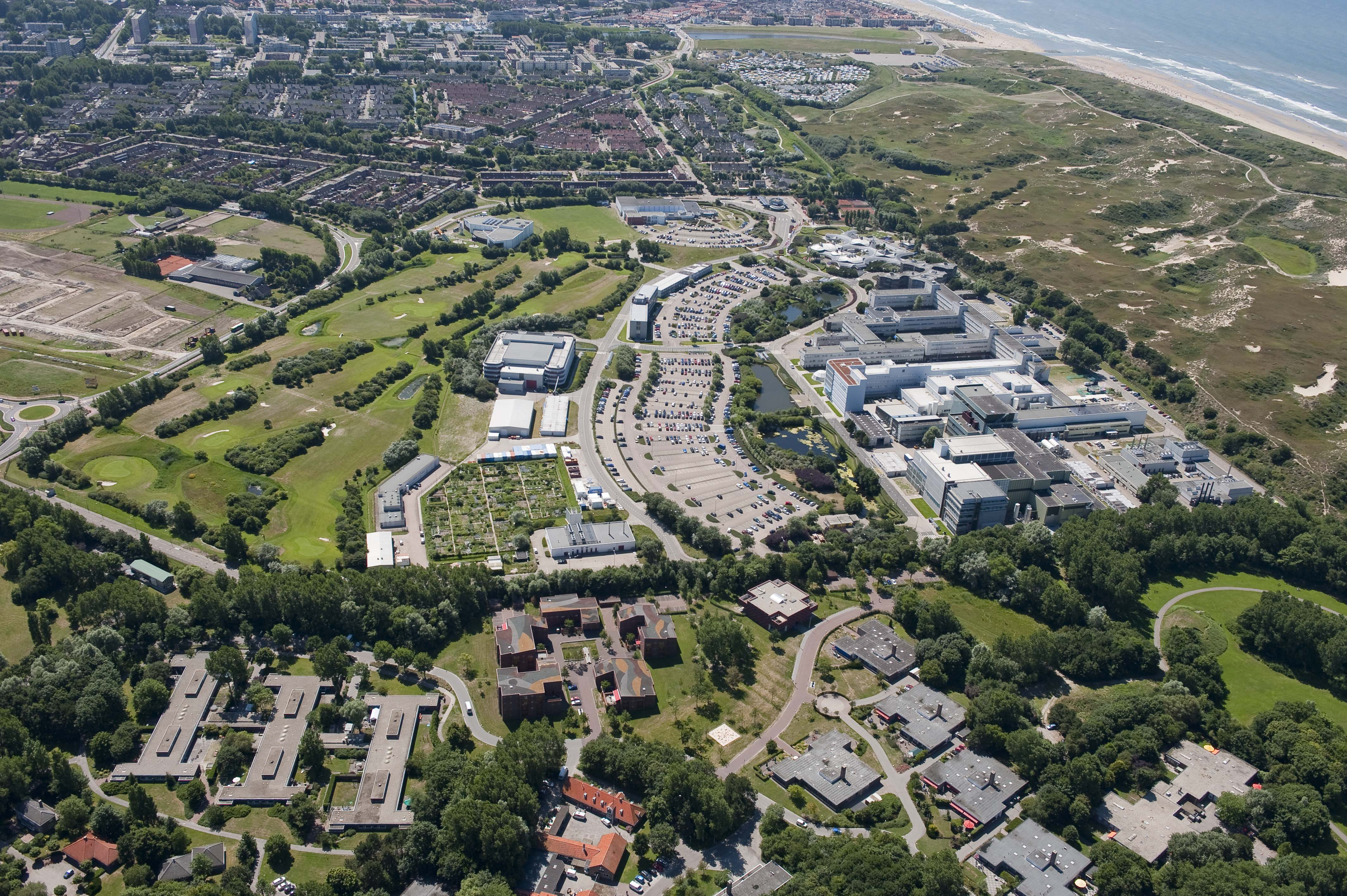
Aerial view of ESA s technical centre ESTEC

The Brandenburg Institute for Society and Security -in German Brandenburgische Institut für Gesellschaft und Sicherheit (BIGS)- is a cooperative venture founded in 2010 between IABG, the University of Potsdam, Airbus Defence and Space (old EADS), and Rolls-Royce.

It is part with IABG, the Fraunhofer Institute for Open Communication Systems (FOKUS) in Berlin and the University of the Bundeswehr Munich of the fit4sec, a center for security and technology which is supported by the Federal Ministry of Education and Research

=== European Test Services ===
European Test Services (ETS) is a subsidiary of IABG founded in 2000, which operates the Test Centre of at the European Space Research and Technology Centre of the European Space Agency. It is located in Noordwijk, The Netherlands.

=== Vites ===
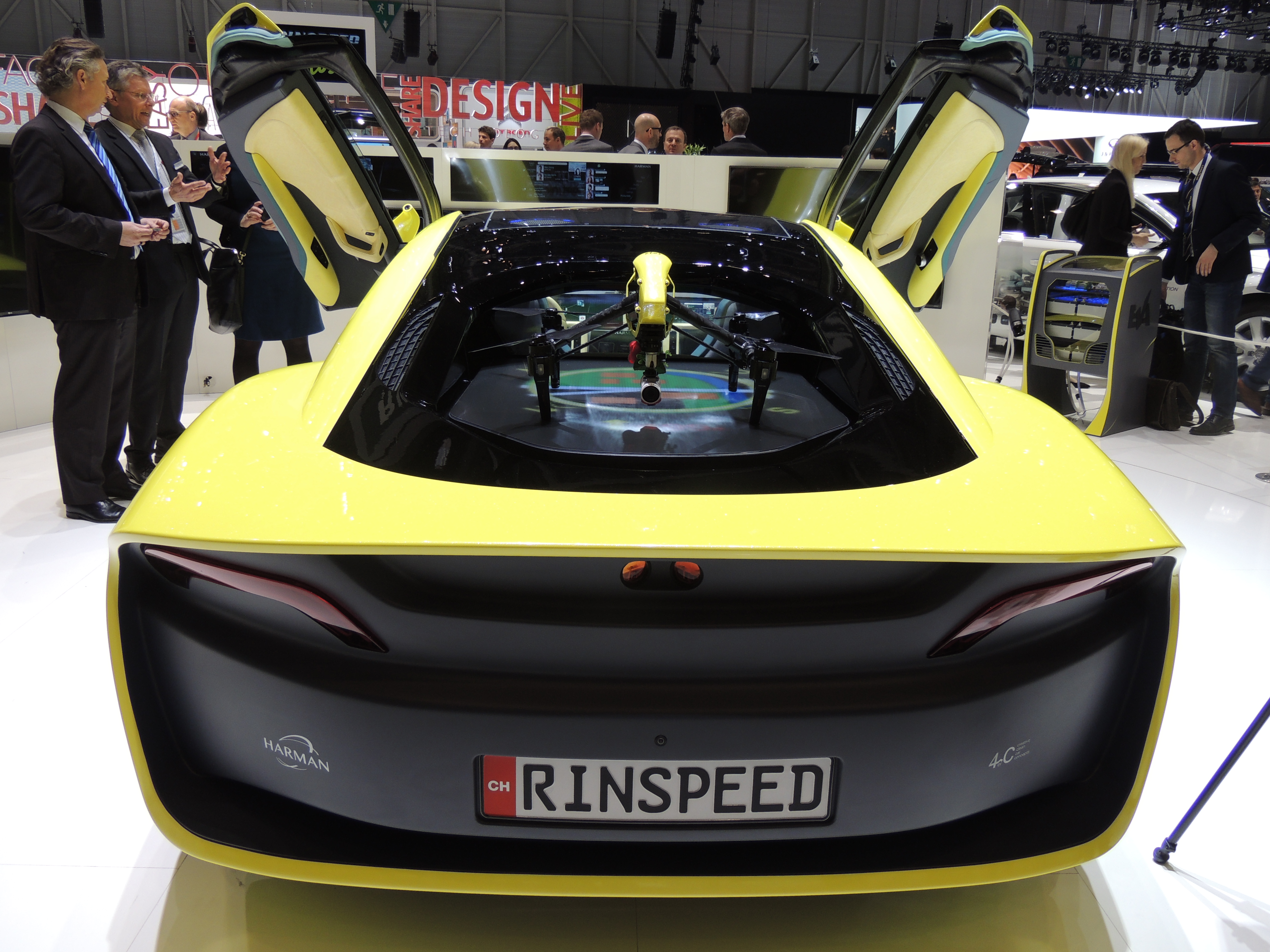
Rinspeed Ʃtos in the Geneva Motor Show 2016

Vites was founded by IABG in 2014. They work in the area of Radio technology applied to emergency operations, providing a mobile ad hoc network HiMoNN (Highly Mobile Network Node) for emergency services in areas without a functioning communication infrastructure. One of the HiMoNN users are the firefighters of the German federal state of Bremen In the same sector they provide a trailer vehicle called Vikomobil for supplying communications in crisis or massive events.

They collaborated with the Swiss automobile manufacturer Rinspeed in the concept cars Ʃtos and Oasis, developing a Satcom On The Move solution integrated in the roof of the car, using flat antenna panels with KARsys technology that doesn't need rotary mechanisms.
