= Charlie Johnson (pilot) =

American businessman and pilot

Charles Johnson is an American businessman and former president of Cessna.

== Early life and education ==
He was born in 1942 in Georgia and grew up in Memphis. He fought in the Vietnam War flying the T-33, T-37, T-38, and the F-105.

== Career ==
Johnson was a personal pilot of Arnold Palmer. He later became a test pilot for company Learjet and ATG Javelin, a fighter-like training airplane. He advanced through the ranks of Cessna to President and COO. Johnson joined Bye Aerospace in 2014 and was inducted into the Colorado Aviation Hall of Fame the same year. He was inducted into the Kansas Aviation Hall of Fame in 2015.
