= RX1E =

RX1E may refer to:

- Liaoning Ruixiang RX1E two-seat electric aircraft
- RX1e, FIA electric rallycross racing category
