= Bye Aerospace =

American aircraft manufacturer

- Type: Privately held company
- Industry: Aerospace
- Founder: George E. Bye
- Headquarters: Unincorporated Arapahoe County, Colorado, United States
- Key people: CEO: George E. Bye
- Products: Electric aircraft
- Subsidiaries: Aero Electric Aircraft Corporation
- Website: www.byeaerospace.com

Bye Aerospace is an American aircraft manufacturer based in unincorporated Arapahoe County, Colorado. The company specializes in the design and manufacture of electric aircraft, including unmanned aircraft for geospatial role and light aircraft for the flight training role. The company was founded by George E. Bye, who remains the CEO.

== History ==
In July 2010, Bye Energy developed a proof-of-concept electrically powered Cessna 172 with support from Cessna Aircraft. Bye Energy changed its name to Beyond Aviation at the time that the prototype commenced taxi tests in July 2011. The aircraft first flew in 2012. The R&D project was not pursued for production and the company is currently dormant.

The company developed the Bye Aerospace Sun Flyer, a modified PC-Aero Elektra One, as a prototype electric aircraft in 2015.

The development of the Sun Flyer 2 was originally carried out by a Bye Aerospace subsidiary, called the Aero Electric Aircraft Corporation. As of March 2018, it was being merged into the parent company.

By July 2015, the company was developing the Sun Flyer 2, a two-seat electric-powered aircraft for the flight training role. By March 2016, Aero Electric Aircraft Corp. has delivered the prototype for final stages of development. It was rolled-out in May 2016. By July 2016, first flight was planned in the fall. By November 2016, ground and taxi tests had begun. It was first flown on 10 April 2018. The derivative Sun Flyer 4 is a four-seat design, yet to be completed. Both aircraft are low-wing designs, with bubble canopies, made from composite materials, predominately carbon fibre. Both are powered by lithium-ion batteries.

The launch customer for both the Sun Flyer 2 and 4 is the Spartan College of Aeronautics and Technology which will employ both for flight training. By September 2018, the company had 130 deposits for the two-seat Sun Flyer 2 and 27 deposits for the larger, four-seat Sun Flyer 4.

On July 31, 2018, Bye Aerospace flew a piloted prototype of its solar-powered unmanned StratoAirNet and manned Solesa from the Northern Colorado Regional Airport. Based on a carbon fiber composite competition sailplane, it has a 15 m (49.2 ft) wing span and thin-film photovoltaic cells from SolAero Technologies. The low-cost, long-endurance commercial and government surveillance aircraft could be used for patrol, mapping, precision agriculture or search-and-rescue and has low infrared and acoustic signatures.

Also under development, in conjunction with the XTI Aircraft Company, is the TriFan 600, a hybrid-electric VTOL business aircraft. Previously, the company developed the Silent Falcon UAV for Silent Falcon UAS Technologies.

In August 2019, the company announced that it was partnering with OXIS Energy to develop a Lithium–sulfur battery for use in the four-seat Sun Flyer 4.

On August 21, 2019, Bye announced the sale of 26 aircraft to Los Angeles-based air taxi operator Quantum Air.

After the project was revealed as under development in June 2020, Bye Aerospace officially announced the eFlyer 800 in April 2021, to be powered by Safran electric motors. This is planned to be an all-electric six- to nine-seat aircraft to compete with traditional fossil-fuel powered executive aircraft for the air taxi, air freight, regional airliner and aircraft charter roles. The eFlyer 800 aims to have operating costs of 20% of the Beechcraft King Air with a cruise speed of up to 320 kn (593 km/h), a 35,000 ft (10,668 m) operating ceiling and a range of 500 nmi (930 km) with 45-minute IFR reserves.

It was announced in May 2021 that Oxis Energy had been placed into administration, with the majority of its employees made redundant.

At AirVenture in July 2021 George Bye of Bye Aerospace stated that the eFlyer 2 will be certified in late 2022 or early 2023, the eFlyer 4 certified in late 2023 or early 2024 and the eFlyer 800 certified in late 2025 or early 2026.

== Aircraft ==
Summary of aircraft built by Bye Aerospace:

- Bye Aerospace Sun Flyer - single example of a prototype
- Bye Aerospace eFlyer 2 - single example of an intended 2-seat training aircraft

== See also ==
Aviation Technology Group
