= Bye Aerospace eFlyer 2 =

Type of aircraft

eFlyer 2

General information
- Type: Electric training aircraft
- National origin: United States
- Manufacturer: Bye Aerospace
- Status: Under development (since 2016)
- Number built: 1

History
- First flight: 10 April 2018
- Variant: Bye Aerospace Sun Flyer 4

The Bye Aerospace eFlyer 2 (formerly the Sun Flyer 2) is a light electric aircraft designed and under development by Bye Aerospace of Denver, Colorado.

The aircraft was first publicly introduced on 11 May 2016, and first flew on 10 April 2018.

The two seater is designed for the flight training market with a single tractor electric motor powered by Lithium-ion batteries.

== Development ==
The design was originally developed by Bye Aerospace subsidiary Aero Electric Aircraft Corporation (AEAC). Arion Aircraft of Shelbyville, Tennessee constructed the proof-of-concept prototype and delivered it in March 2016.

The eFlyer 2 was first publicly introduced at the Centennial Airport in Colorado on 11 May 2016. Ground and taxi tests on the prototype were started in November 2016. A four-seater derivative model, named the Bye Aerospace Sun Flyer 4, was announced in July 2017. It will be a day/night IFR aircraft with an 800 lb (360 kg) payload, capable of 150 kn (280 km/h) maximum cruise speed and a 4.2 hour endurance.

The eFlyer 2 first flew on 10 April 2018. AEAC and Bye Aerospace merged in 2018 and Bye Aerospace took over the project.

Development of the four-seater should follow completion of the smaller eFlyer 2, the certification of which is forecast to cost US$25 million. Bye had received 220 orders for the two models by October 2018. By January 2019, Subaru and SBI Investment invested in Bye Aerospace to advance the eFlyer 2 certification. On 8 February 2019 the eFlyer 2 flew for the first time in its intended production configuration, including with a Siemens SP70D electric motor.

FAA Part 23 Certification was planned for 2020, with Siemens taking an active part.

In November 2020 it was announced that the motor supplier would instead be Safran. In an email to AOPA, George Bye indicated the reason for the change, that Bye Aerospace was “… unable to reach a mutual commercial proposition…” with Siemens/Rolls-Royce.

At AirVenture in July 2021 George Bye of Bye Aerospace stated that the eFlyer 2 will be certified in late 2022 or early 2023 with a target price of US$489,000.

A Bye Aerospace press release in January 2023 announced that the eFlyer 2 “…has reached FAA Approval of its G-2 “Means of Compliance for Certification” issue paper.”

In September 2024, a press release officially announced the initiation of building eFlyer 2 serial #00001 at the Bye Aerospace facility in Centennial, Colorado. See: Bye Aerospace Begins Initial Build of First eFlyer 2

In June 2026 articles and press releases discussed eFlyer 2 status. At that time it was said that “…the eFlyer 2 has undergone structural load testing of the wing, fuselage, and flight controls, and limit-load testing as well as low- and high-speed ground testing.” See: Bye Aerospace Reveals Electric Airplane Suppliers; Company’s eFlyer 2 is expected to achieve first flight soon

As of September 2026, the eFlyer 2 had its experimental-category flight certificate granted.. On September 17, 2026, the prototype registered as N400EF made its first flight, five minutes in duration, piloted by Elliot Seguin. Flight details.

== Design ==
The aircraft is intended to be certified under FAR 23 and supplied as a complete ready-to-fly-aircraft. It has been designed specifically for the flight training market and is projected to have a 3.5 hour duration. The eFlyer 2 features a cantilever low-wing, a two-seat side-by-side configuration enclosed cockpit under a bubble canopy, fixed tricycle landing gear and a single electric motor in tractor configuration powered by up to six Lithium-ion battery packs.

The design has a gross weight of 1,900 lb (860 kg) and is made from composite material, primarily carbon fibre. The cockpit employs an iPad used for cockpit instrumentation display, including motor, battery and aircraft systems. The aircraft connects to Redbird Flight Simulations' Sidekick system, which wirelessly tracks the eFlyer's motor, flight time, physical location and attitude in real time when in flight.

The previously used 57 lb (26 kg) Siemens SP70D had a takeoff rating of 90 kW (120 hp) and 70 kW (94 hp) continuous. Utah-based Electric Power Systems provides the 92-kWh energy storage including battery modules, management and distribution. The 138 kn (256 km/h) cruise aircraft is projected to have hourly operating costs one-sixth of a piston-powered Cessna 172.

The Safran motor announced in November 2020 will be from the ENGINeUS 100 line.

== Operational history ==
By February 2019, one example, the prototype, had been registered in the United States with the Federal Aviation Administration.

By December 2018 the company had 220 deposits, split evenly between the eFlyer 2 and eFlyer 4, growing to 298 by April 2019. In December 2020, the company indicated it had 711 purchase agreements.

== Operators ==
The following organizations have ordered the aircraft:

- Spartan College of Aeronautics and Technology - 25
- OSM Aviation - 60
- Elfly - 18

== Specifications (eFlyer 2) ==
Data from AVweb

General characteristics

- Crew: one
- Capacity: one passenger
- Wingspan: 38 ft (12 m)
- Wing area: 129 sq ft (12.0 m^{2})
- Empty weight: 1,460 lb (662 kg)
- Gross weight: 1,900 lb (862 kg)
- Powerplant: 1 × Safran electric motor with up to six lithium-ion battery packs, 115 hp (90 kW)
- Propellers: 3-bladed composite

Performance

- Maximum speed: 135 kn (155 mph, 250 km/h)
- Endurance: 3.5 hours
- Maximum glide ratio: 20.6:1
- Rate of climb: 1,050 ft/min (5.3 m/s)

== See also ==
Related development

- Arion Lightning

Aircraft of comparable role, configuration, and era

- Pipistrel Alpha Electro
- Liaoning Ruixiang RX1E
- Yuneec International E430

Related lists

- List of electric aircraft
