= Stavatti Aerospace =

American company

Stavatti Aerospace Ltd.
- Type: Privately held company
- Founded: 1994
- Founder: Christopher Beskar
- Headquarters: Niagara Falls, New York, United States
- Key people: Christopher Beskar (CEO); David Wilcock (Director of Advanced Technology)
- Number of employees: 25 (estimate 2026)
- Website: stavatti.com

Stavatti Aerospace Ltd. is an American company headquartered in Niagara Falls, New York that purports to operate in the aerospace industry, as well as wholesale auto storage. Founded in 1994, its CEO is Christopher Beskar. Skepticism about Stavatti Aerospace's claims regarding its business and operations have been repeatedly raised by media throughout its existence, and the company has been involved in several legal disputes.

== History ==
=== Early history ===
Stavatti Aerospace was co-founded by Christopher Beskar, a self-described Star Trek fan, in 1994 while a student at the University of Wisconsin-River Falls. Beskar was joined in the venture by his father, a former Alaska Bush pilot who died a few years later.

In 1998 – two years after graduating university – Beskar started planning to take over a derelict Bell Aircraft manufacturing plant in Niagara County, New York to produce combat aircraft for the United States armed forces and U.S. allies. Niagara County Industrial Development Agency (NCIDA) head John Simon discussed the potential of extending economic incentives to Stavatti to support their proposal, though the project was eventually shelved.

By the early 2000s, according to Vice, Stavatti was "the industrial equivalent of an internet troll, spreading titillating graphics depicting futuristic airplanes it stood little chance of ever producing". According to Wired, the company was "famous for its extravagant claims about advanced aircraft and weapons" and was known for "calling up Pentagon offices" to pitch its designs.

In 2008, Stavatti acquired the designs of the ATG Javelin from Aviation Technology Group following that company's bankruptcy. A decade later, Stavatti was among four or five companies to bid on a replacement for the United States Air Force's T-38 trainer, marketing the Javelin design for that purpose, though – according to Smithsonian Magazine – it was considered an "extreme longshot". The contract to replace the T-38 was ultimately awarded to Boeing.

=== Abbotsford plan ===
In 2019, economic development officials in Abbotsford, British Columbia reported that Stavatti was eyeing Abbotsford as the location for a possible plant that would employ up to 10,000 people and would open by 2022, and that it recently received $1.5 billion in private funding. The Abbotsford News noted that it was unable to confirm the veracity of the claimed funding, was unable to get in contact with Stavatti's CEO, and was unable to access Stavatti's website. It reported the company had "a reputation for having big ideas that never come to fruition".

=== Return to Niagara ===
By 2020, Simon – who had left the NCIDA in 2003 – was working for Stavatti as its chief strategic development and asset officer. That year, the NCIDA awarded Stavatti several tax subsidies to support Beskar's decades-old plan to, according to the Niagara Express, "build military and commercial jets at a vacant military hangar in Niagara Falls". At the time, according to Buffalo Business First, the company pledged it would create 590 jobs in the area by 2025. According to the Buffalo News, as of 2021, there was no evidence Stavatti had "produced a single airplane" of its own design in the company's then 26-year history. Its only known facilities were a "one-person office suite", a "machine shop ... slightly larger than a basketball court", and Beskar's house.

In February 2023, according to The Buffalo News, one of Stavatti's investors sued the company, alleging racketeering and fraud and claiming the company was a ponzi scheme.

NCIDA subsequently rescinded the subsidies it had awarded in 2020, citing little progress by the company on its plan, and several local construction contractors filed lawsuits alleging nonpayment or underpayment by Stavatti on services they had provided.

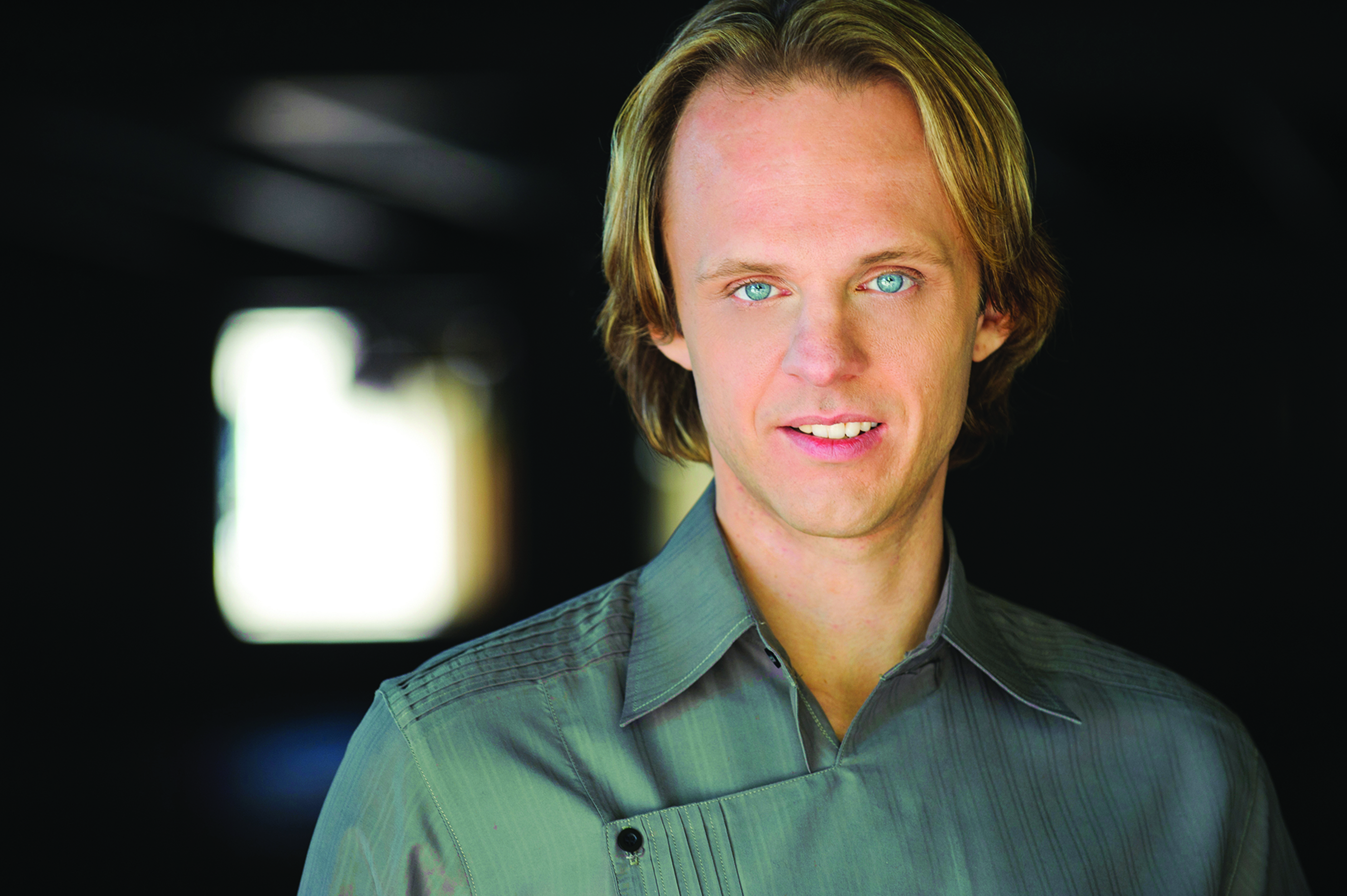
As of 2023, David Wilcock was Stavatti's director of advanced technology.

In December 2024, Stavatti was evicted from some of the space it had been occupying in Niagara Falls, FlightGlobal reported. Several months later, in March 2025, a staff editorial in The Buffalo News opined that "Stavatti Aerospace has worn out its welcome" in Niagara Falls and that it was time for Beskar "to pack up his computer-generated images and go". The column went on to allege that "after five years of unfulfilled promises, unsubstantiated claims and unpaid debts, 9400 Porter Road still looks much the same as when the company moved in: vacant and inactive" and that "Stavatti has not produced a single airplane – military, commercial or otherwise".

In late 2025, Stavatti devised a plan to lease some of the land it was occupying in Niagara to auto importer DVS Corporation for use in storing cars, creating what it said was a new division of the company, Stavatti Automative, for the purpose. The local planning board recommended the scheme be rejected and Stavatti be denied permitting for car storage on the site.

== Personnel ==
UFO media personality David Wilcock was the company's director of advanced technology prior to his suicide in 2026 following his struggles with depression and massive financial debts. Wilcock also served on the company's board of directors and, according to Beskar, was a "seven figure investor", its "23rd founding shareholder" and was "directly involved" in aircraft development.

== See also ==
- Buffalo–Niagara Falls metropolitan area
