= Bye Aerospace Sun Flyer =

Sun Flyer

General information
- Type: Amateur-built aircraft
- National origin: United States
- Manufacturer: Bye Aerospace
- Designer: Calin Gologan
- Status: Experimental prototype only (2015)
- Number built: one

The Bye Aerospace Sun Flyer (also previously known as the Aero Electric Aircraft Corporation Sun Flyer) is an electric aircraft that was developed from the PC-Aero Elektra One by Bye Aerospace's Aero Electric Aircraft Corporation division of Denver, Colorado, United States, introduced in 2015. The company had a license agreement and engineering contract for the design with Calin Gologan, the Elektra One's designer.

== Design and development ==
The aircraft features composite construction, a cantilever low-wing, a single-seat, enclosed cockpit under a bubble canopy, fixed tricycle landing gear with wheel pants and a single electric motor in tractor configuration.

The Sun Flyer differed from the PC-Aero Elektra One by incorporating new landing gear, propeller and instruments. It provided a prototype for a proposed two-seater that was to have four Panasonic lithium-ion batteries, along with solar panels installed on the wings, horizontal tail and on the fuselage behind the canopy. This two-seater was intended to be certified for day and night Visual Flight Rules. The proposed two-seat version of the Sun Flyer eventually led to a new design, the Bye Aerospace Sun Flyer 2 instead.

The Spartan College of Aeronautics and Technology had reserved the first 20 two-seat models that were to be produced.

== Specifications (Sun Flyer) ==
Data from Aviation Week and Aviation Pros

General characteristics

- Crew: one
- Powerplant: 1 × electric motor powered by lithium-ion batteries and solar panels
- Propellers: 3-bladed composite

Performance

== See also ==
- List of electric aircraft
