= 2021 Colorado mid-air collision =

2021 mid-air collision in Colorado, United States

2021 Colorado mid-air collision Key Lime Air Flight 970 · BB CO LLC N416DJ
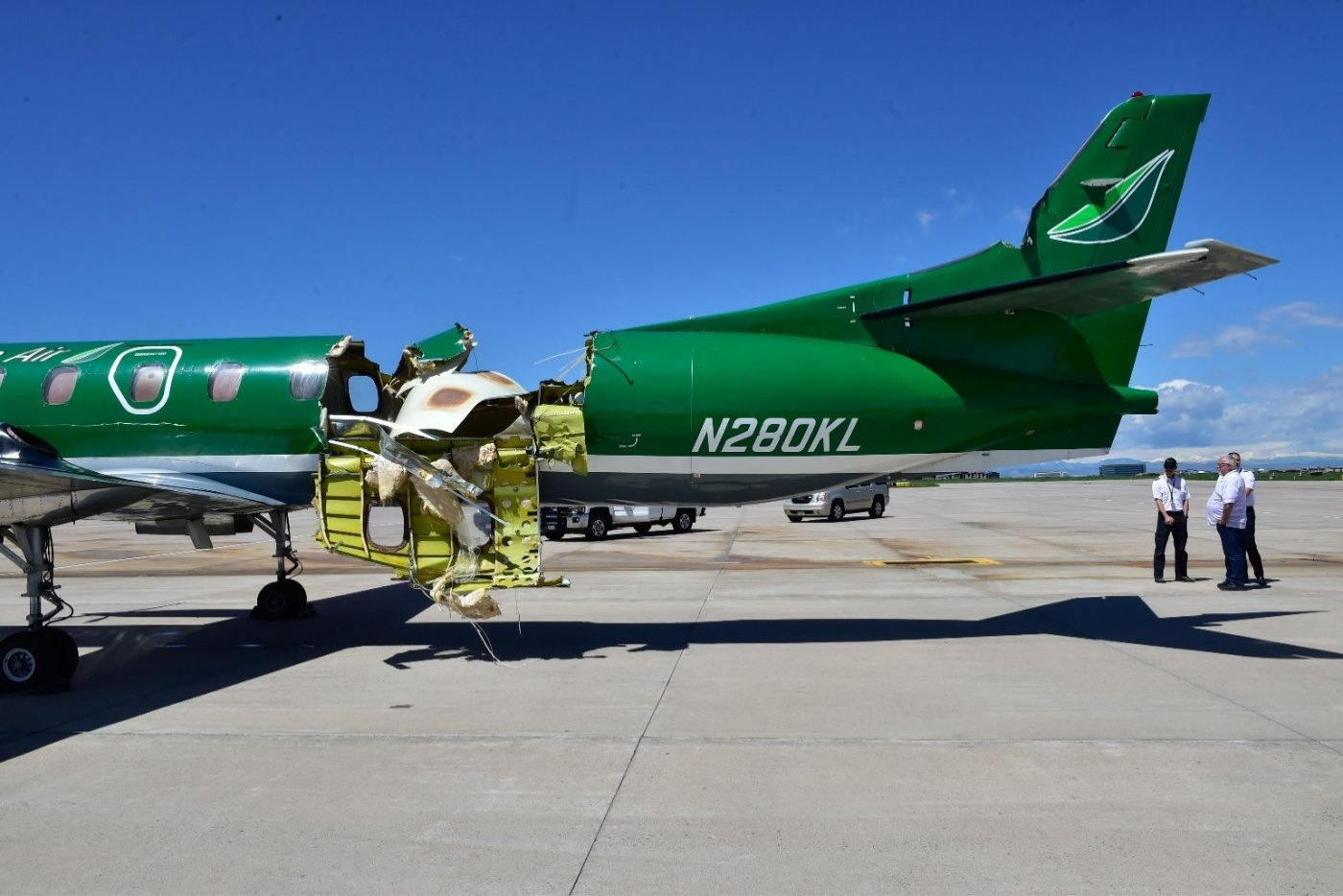
- Key Lime Air Flight 970 at Centennial Airport after the collision, with damage to the empennage and vertical stabilizer.

Accident
- Date: May 12, 2021
- Summary: Mid-air collision on final approach to parallel runways
- Site: Cherry Creek State Park, Arapahoe County, Colorado; 39°37′30″N 104°51′07″W
- Total fatalities: 0
- Total injuries: 0
- Total survivors: 3

First aircraft
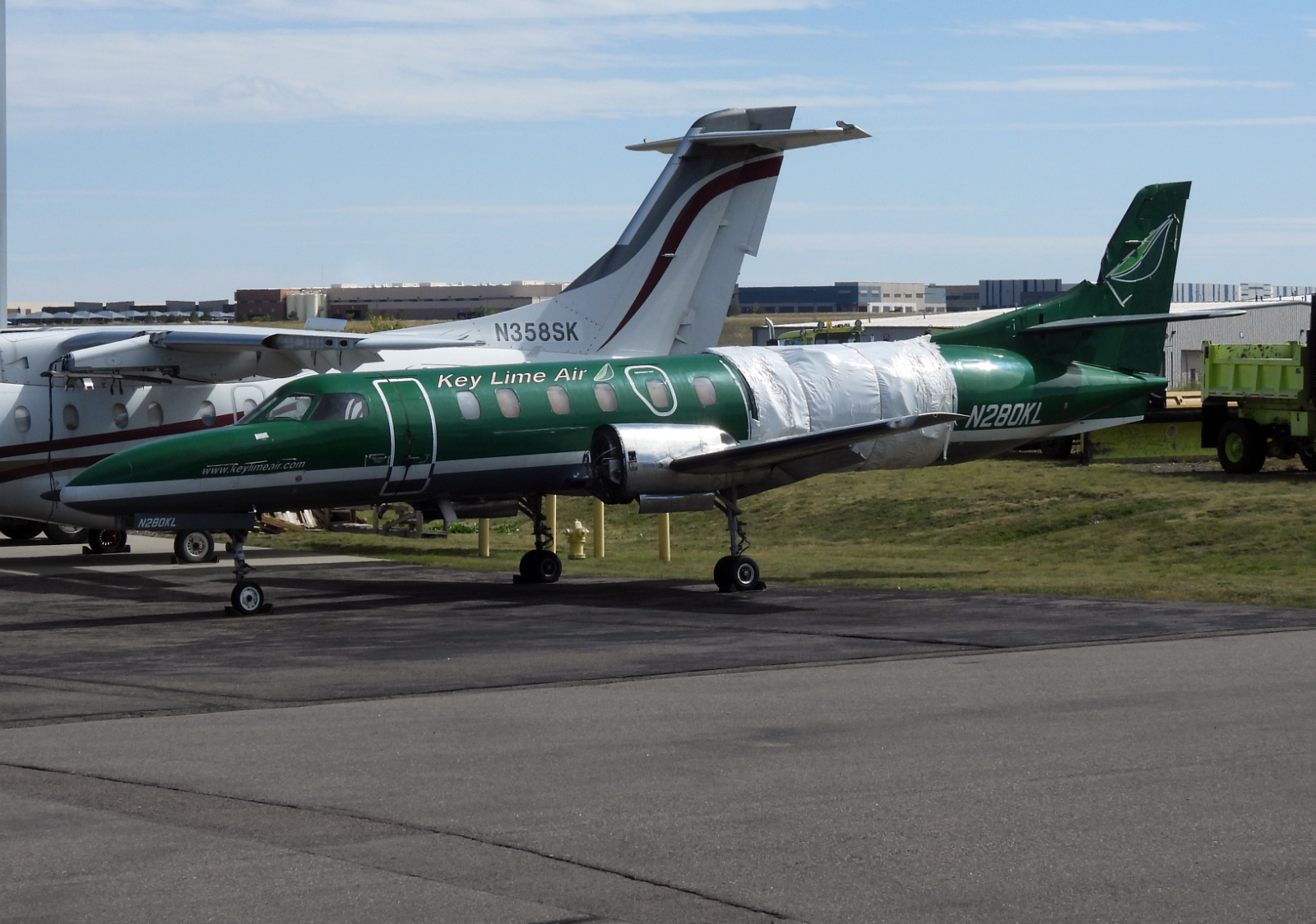
- N280KL, the Key Lime Air Swearingen SA226 Metroliner involved in the accident, pictured in 2023
- Type: Swearingen SA226TC Metroliner
- Operator: Key Lime Air
- IATA flight No.: KG970
- ICAO flight No.: LYM970
- Call sign: KEY LIME 970
- Registration: N280KL
- Flight origin: Harriet Alexander Field, Salida, Colorado
- Destination: Centennial Airport, Colorado
- Occupants: 1
- Crew: 1
- Fatalities: 0
- Injuries: 0
- Survivors: 1

Second aircraft
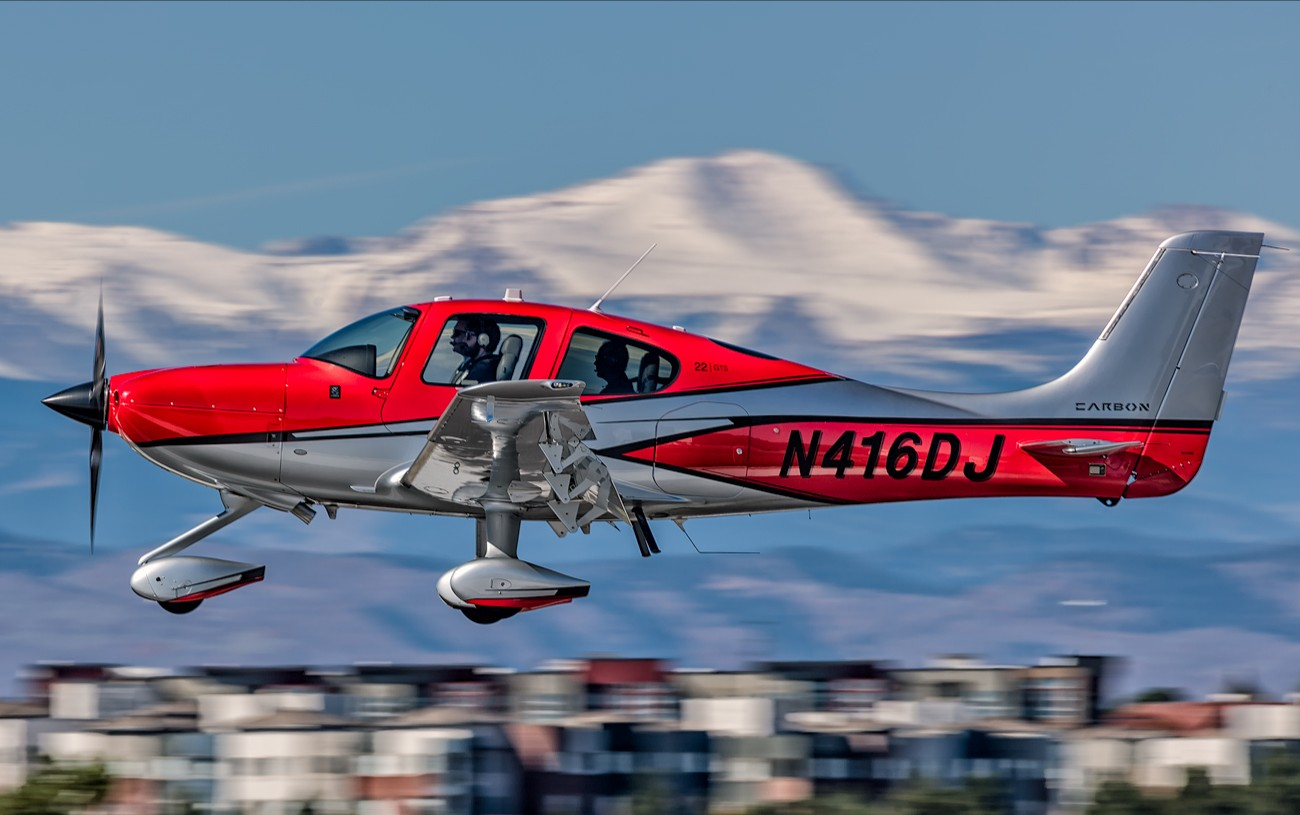
- N416DJ, the Cirrus SR22 GTS G5 carbon involved in the accident, pictured in 2017
- Type: Cirrus SR22 GTS G5
- Operator: BB CO LLC
- Call sign: NOVEMBER 416 DELTA JULIET
- Registration: N416DJ
- Flight origin: Centennial Airport, Colorado
- Destination: Centennial Airport, Colorado
- Occupants: 2
- Passengers: 1
- Crew: 1
- Fatalities: 0
- Injuries: 0
- Survivors: 2

On 12 May 2021, Key Lime Air Flight 970, a Fairchild Swearingen Metroliner operating a chartered cargo flight from Salida to Centennial, Colorado, collided in mid-air with a private Cirrus SR22 near Centennial Airport. Despite having sustained severe damage, the Swearingen Metroliner managed to land safely while the Cirrus SR22 deployed its CAPS system and safely parachuted to the ground. All three occupants on board both aircraft survived uninjured.

== Background ==
=== Aircraft ===
==== Flight 970 ====
The aircraft operating as flight 970 was a 43-year-old Swearingen SA226TC Metroliner registered as N280KL. It was built in 1978 and had the manufacturing number TC-280.

==== N416DJ ====
N416DJ was a 5 year old Cirrus SR22 GTS G5. It was manufactured in 2016 and has the manufacturing number 4394.

== Accident ==
At about 10:20 am local time, a Cirrus SR22 light aircraft collided in mid-air with Key Lime Air Flight 970, an air charter cargo flight from Salida, Colorado, operated by a Swearingen SA226-TC Metroliner over Cherry Creek State Park in Arapahoe County. The collision destroyed a large section of the cabin of the Metroliner and damaged the empennage, but the pilot—who was the sole aircraft occupant and, based on communications with air traffic control (ATC), was initially unaware of the extent of the damage—was able to make a safe landing at Centennial Airport despite the significant damage to the fuselage and subsequent difficulties with the right-hand engine. The pilot of the Cirrus, which was a private rental aircraft on a local flight from Centennial Airport, deployed the Cirrus Airframe Parachute System (CAPS) and made a safe parachute-assisted forced landing near Cherry Creek Reservoir; the pilot and single passenger were not injured.

== Investigation ==
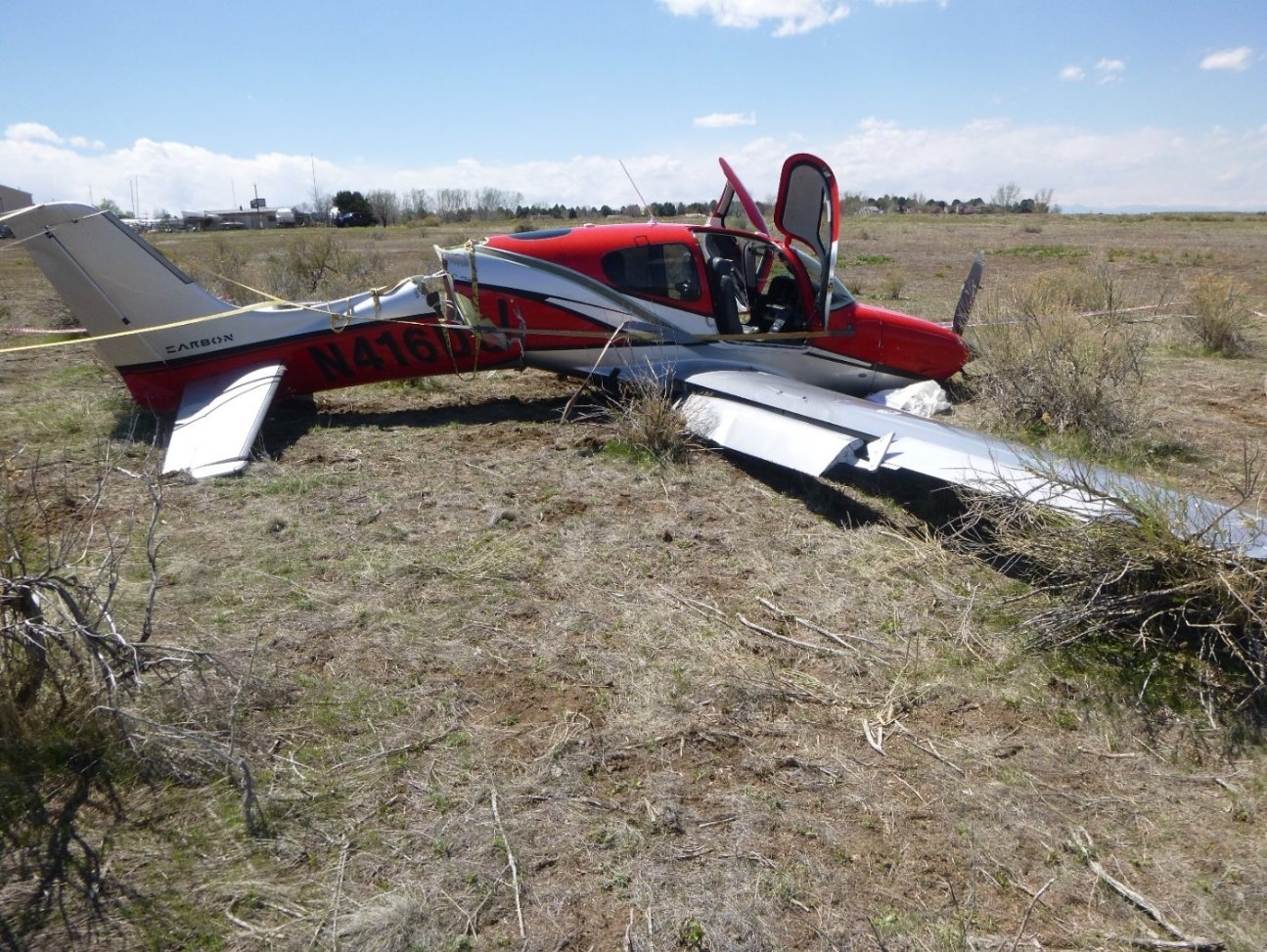
Wreckage of the Cirrus SR22

The National Transportation Safety Board determined that the accident was caused by failures of airmanship and ATC. The SR22 pilot flew too fast in the airfield traffic pattern and overshot his turn, resulting in the SR22 crossing the extended centerline of the parallel runway where the Metroliner was on final approach for landing. When the collision occurred, the SR22 wing flaps had been lowered to 50% but the aircraft was flying at 140 kn (160 mph; 260 km/h), much faster than the recommended speed of 85–90 kn (98–104 mph; 157–167 km/h) per the aircraft flight manual. Furthermore, the two parallel runways were being worked by different ATC controllers using different radio frequencies; the controller talking to the SR22 pilot issued traffic advisories regarding the Metroliner as required by regulations, but the other controller did not tell the Metroliner pilot about the approaching SR22, and thus the Metroliner pilot was unaware of the other aircraft and did not know to take evasive action. The probable cause of the accident is as follows:

The Cirrus pilot’s failure to maintain the final approach course for the assigned runway, which resulted in a collision with the Swearingen which was on final approach to the parallel runway. Contributing to the accident was the failure of the controller to issue a traffic advisory to the Swearingen pilot regarding the location of the Cirrus, and the Cirrus pilot’s decision to fly higher than recommended approach speed which resulted in a larger turn radius and contributed to his overshoot of the final approach course.
