= Key Lime Air =

American regional airline

Coordinates: 39.574934°N 104.838067°W

| IATA | ICAO | Call sign |
|---|---|---|
| KG | LYM | KEY LIME |
- Founded: 1997
- AOC #: KY7A882H
- Subsidiaries: Denver Air Connection
- Fleet size: 34
- Headquarters: Centennial Airport; Dove Valley, Colorado
- Key people: Cliff Honeycutt (founder, President and CEO); Glen Rich (founder, Vice President and COO)
- Website: keylimeair.com

Key Lime Air is a United States airline with corporate headquarters at Centennial Airport in Dove Valley, Colorado, within the Denver metropolitan area. Established in 1997, Key Lime Air operates scheduled air service, various types of public and private charter (under its Denver Air Connection brand), United Parcel Service cargo feeder operations and regularly transports ICE detainees around the US.

== Denver Air Connection ==
Key Lime Air operates FAR Part 121 scheduled regional flights through its Denver Air Connection brand from Denver International Airport. Additionally, Key Lime operates public air charter services under FAR Part 135 from Centennial Airport.

== Cargo operations ==
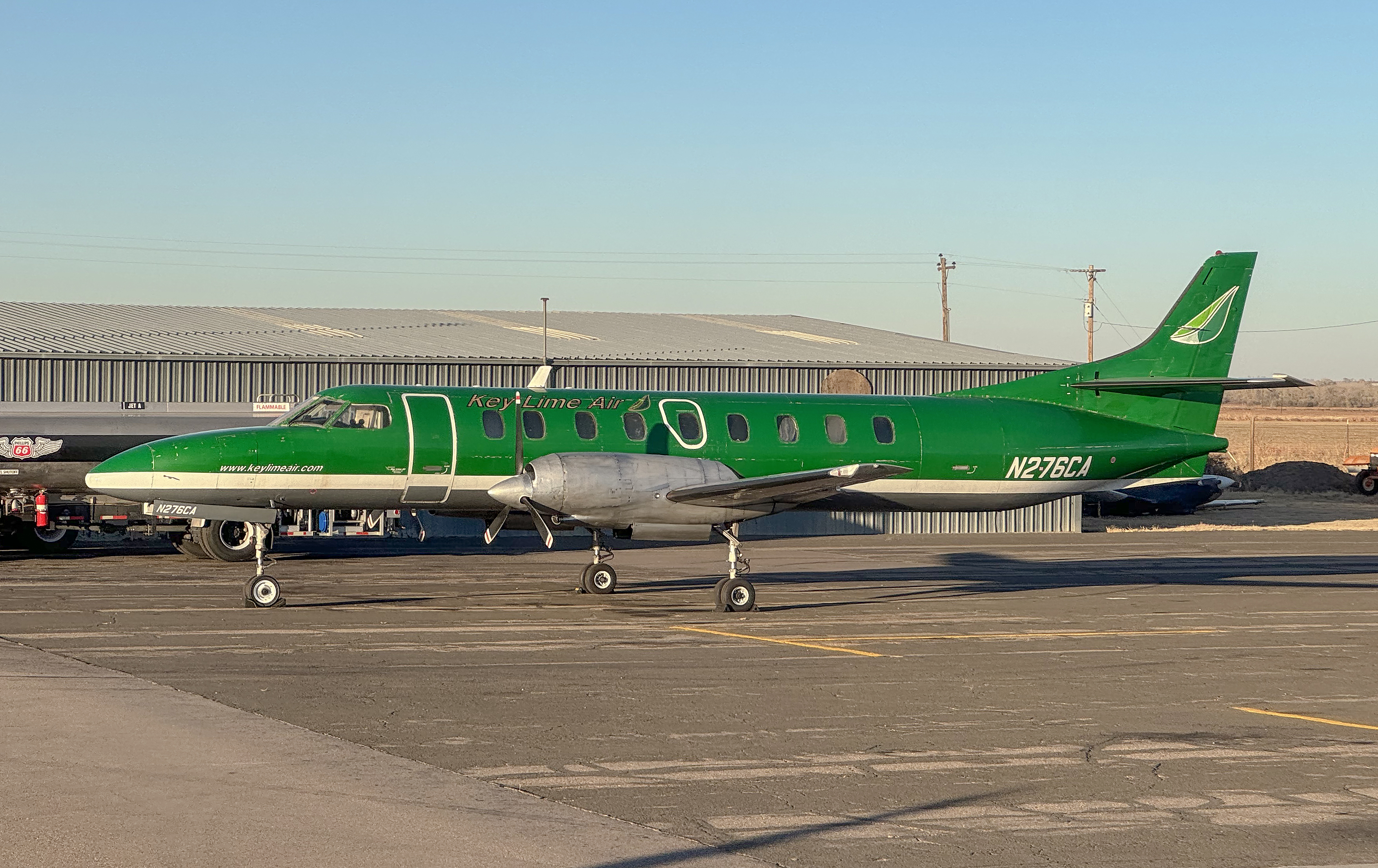
Freight Metroliner in Lamar, Colorado

Key Lime Air operates on-demand cargo flights using Fairchild Swearingen Metroliner aircraft. Cargo operations carry UPS overnight and express delivery packages throughout Colorado, Wyoming, Nebraska, and Kansas.

== Fleet ==
The Key Lime Air fleet includes:

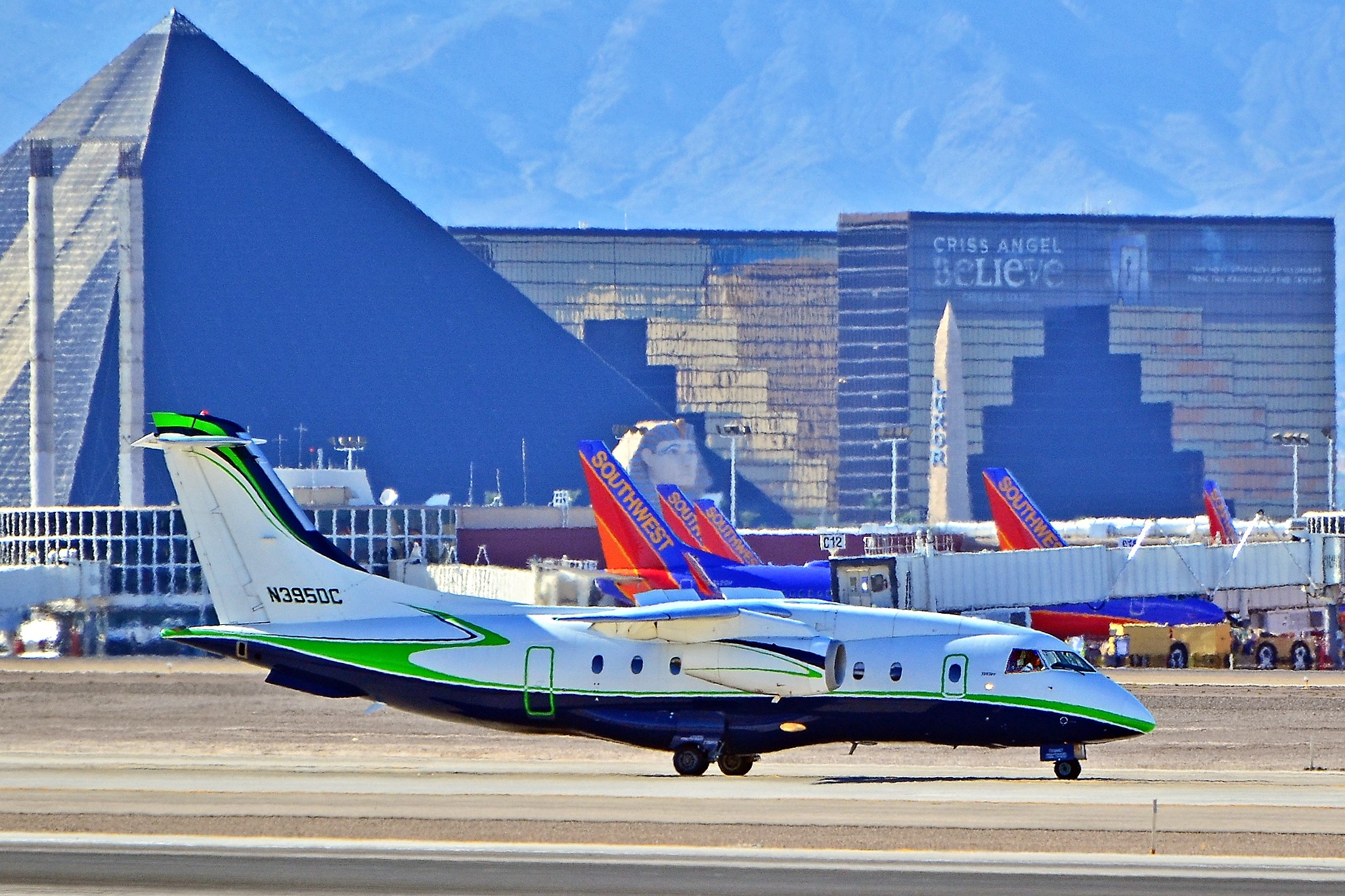
Key Lime Air Dornier 328JET at Harry Reid International Airport

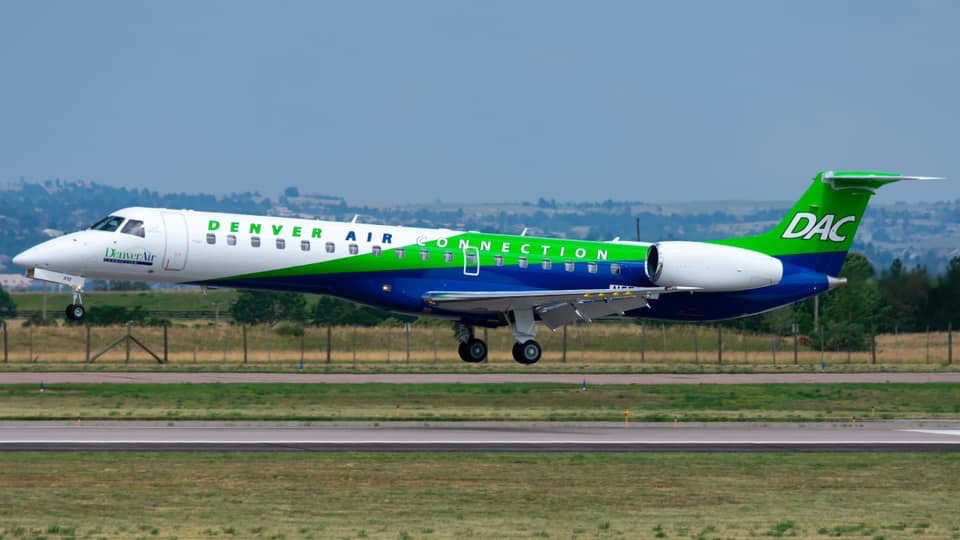
DAC Embraer ERJ 145

Key Lime Air fleet
| Aircraft | Total | Passengers | Notes |
|---|---|---|---|
| Embraer EMB 120ER | 1 (as of March 2026) | | Cargo operations |
| Embraer ERJ 135 | 1 (as of March 2026) | | |
| Embraer ERJ 145 | 10 (as of March 2026) | 50 | Part 121 and Part 135 scheduled and charter operations. 2 configured with 30 seats. |
| Dornier 328JET | 6 (as of March 2026) | 30 | Part 121 and Part 135 scheduled and charter operations (2 stored) |
| Fairchild Metroliner | 5 | 9 | Part 135 charter and commuter operations. Configured with 9 seats for EAS. |
| Fairchild Metroliner | 16 | | Cargo operations |
| Learjet 24 | 1 | 5 | Part 135 charter operations (stored) |
| Total | 34 | | |

== ICE deportation flights ==
Advocates monitoring United States Immigration and Customs Enforcement (ICE) deportation flights in 2025, including Human Rights Watch, identified Key Lime Air as one of the charter operators flying deportees to ICE detention centers. Shackled deportees were seen boarding aircraft registered to a company affiliated with Key Lime at Willow Run Airport and King County International Airport, and disembarking at El Paso; Alexandria, Louisiana; Harlingen, Texas; and Lake City, Florida.

In December 2025, citing opposition to the ICE flights, the Denver City Council voted to deny Key Lime a lease for ground storage space at Denver International Airport, where Key Lime operates Denver Air Connection flights. The City Council lacks the authority to directly stop Key Lime from using the airport, and the airline can still use the common apron area at the airport for free; according to council members, the cancellation of the lease is aimed at jeopardizing $90 million in Federal Aviation Administration airport grants, which they believe will pressure the airline to vacate the airport. In January 2026, local advocates pressed the Wayne County Airport Authority board to stop Key Lime from operating ICE flights from Willow Run, but the board said it does not control agreements between airlines and federal agencies as long as they meet legal and safety requirements.

== Incidents and accidents ==
- December 30, 2014 – A Key Lime Air Cessna 404, aircraft registration N404MG, operating as Flight LYM182, had an engine fail shortly after takeoff from Centennial Airport, and the pilot was unable to successfully return to the airport. The airplane was destroyed and the pilot and sole occupant were killed. The reason for the engine failure could not be conclusively determined, but the pilot did not properly secure the failed engine, making it more difficult to continue flying.
- January 21, 2015 – Key Lime Air Piper PA-31 N66906, on a cargo flight to Colby, Kansas, crashed while attempting an emergency landing at Goodland Municipal Airport after one engine failed and the other engine lost power. The aircraft struck power lines before crashing in a field; the pilot and sole aircraft occupant were not injured but the aircraft sustained serious damage. The crash was attributed to fuel starvation caused by the pilot's poor fuel management; a contributing factor was pilot fatigue.
- December 5, 2016 – Key Lime Air Fairchild Swearingen SA-227DC Metro N765FA, operating as Flight LYM308, crashed in Camilla, Georgia after both wings failed. The flight was en route to Southwest Georgia Regional Airport and there were heavy rains and storms in the area at the time. The sole aircraft occupant, the pilot, was killed. The accident was attributed to the pilot's decision to continue flight into an area of known severe weather, his loss of control due to spatial disorientation, and the aircraft's ensuing in-flight breakup.
- May 12, 2021 – A Cirrus SR22 N416DJ and Key Lime Air Flight 970, Swearingen SA-226-TC Metro N280KL operating a charter cargo flight, collided on approach to Centennial Airport. The Cirrus made a safe off-airport parachute-assisted landing, while the Key Lime pilot landed safely at Centennial Airport despite the loss of a section of the cabin roof, and damage to the empennage. There were no injuries.
- December 15, 2022 – A Key Lime Air Fairchild Swearingen Metroliner SA-226-TC, N398KL, while returning to Wichita Dwight D. Eisenhower National Airport, attempted to land with the gear in the up position. The pilot reportedly heard his propeller blades scrape the runway as he flared for landing. He immediately executed a go-around, extended his landing gear, and landed uneventfully soon after. The airplane was extensively damaged in the accident.
