= Dove Valley, Colorado =

Census-designated place in Arapahoe County, Colorado, United States

- census-designated place
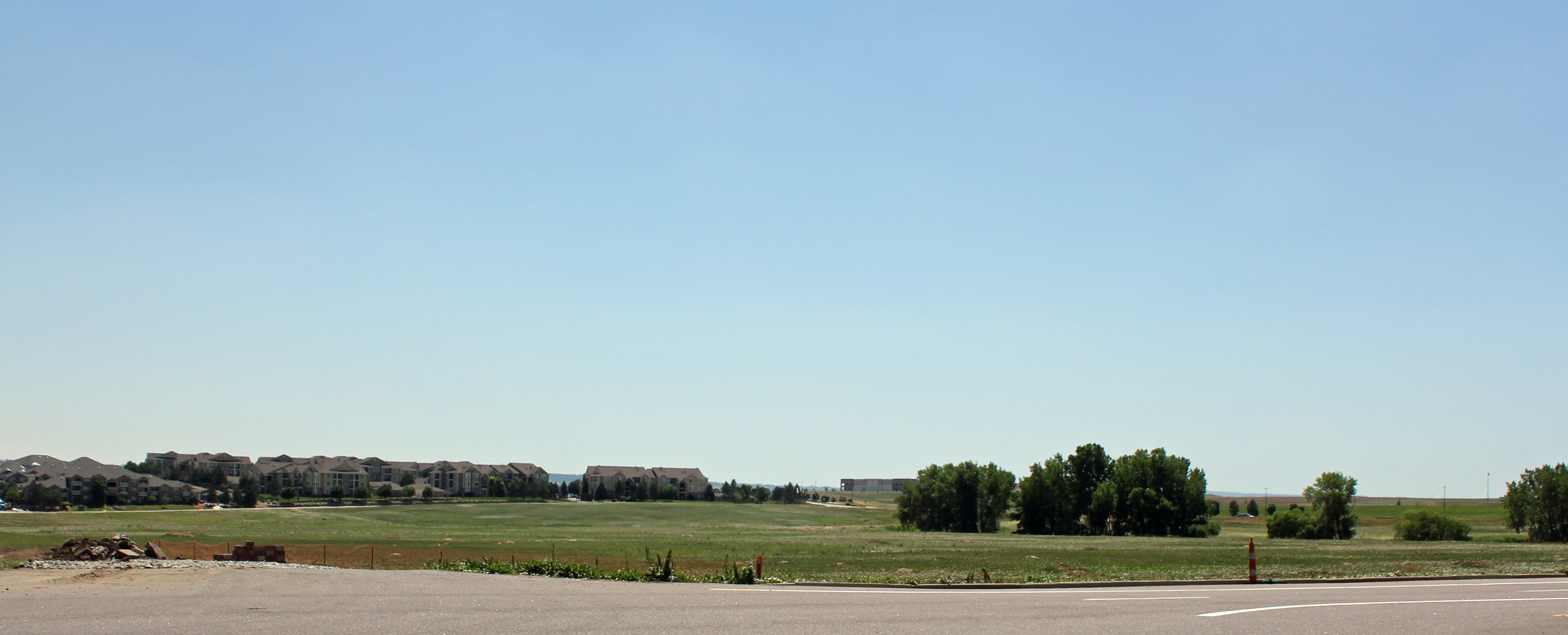
- A view of Dove Valley looking southeast from Potomac Street near the courthouse.

- Location of the Dove Valley CDP in Arapahoe County, Colorado
- Coordinates: 39°34′30″N 104°49′51″W
- Country: United States
- State: Colorado
- County: Arapahoe

Government
  - Type: unincorporated community
  - Body: Arapahoe County

Area
  - Total: 3.578 sq mi (9.267 km^{2})
  - Land: 3.578 sq mi (9.267 km^{2})
  - Water: 0 sq mi (0.000 km^{2})
- Elevation: 5,735 ft (1,748 m)

Population (2020)
  - Total: 5,640
  - Density: 1,580/sq mi (609/km^{2})
- Time zone: UTC−07:00 (MST)
  - Summer (DST): UTC−06:00 (MDT)
- ZIP code: Centennial 80112
- Area codes: 303/720/983
- GNIS CDP ID: 2629985
- FIPS code: 08-21330

Dove Valley is an unincorporated community and a census-designated place (CDP) located in and governed by Arapahoe County, Colorado, United States. The population of the Dove Valley CDP was 5,640 at the United States Census 2020. The CDP is a part of the Denver-Aurora-Centennial, CO Metropolitan Statistical Area and the Front Range Urban Corridor. The Dove Valley Metropolitan District provides services to the area, which lies in ZIP code 80112.

== History ==
The unincorporated community has never had its own post office. The Centennial, Colorado, post office (ZIP code 80112) serves the area.

== Geography ==
The Dove Valley CDP has an area of 2,290 acres (9.267 km^{2}), all land.

== Demographics ==
=== 2020 census ===
As of the 2020 census, Dove Valley had a population of 5,640. The median age was 31.1 years. 26.2% of residents were under the age of 18 and 5.0% of residents were 65 years of age or older. For every 100 females there were 96.8 males, and for every 100 females age 18 and over there were 95.0 males age 18 and over.

100.0% of residents lived in urban areas, while 0.0% lived in rural areas.

There were 2,308 households in Dove Valley, of which 35.9% had children under the age of 18 living in them. Of all households, 33.3% were married-couple households, 24.2% were households with a male householder and no spouse or partner present, and 33.3% were households with a female householder and no spouse or partner present. About 31.8% of all households were made up of individuals and 4.2% had someone living alone who was 65 years of age or older.

There were 2,396 housing units, of which 3.7% were vacant. The homeowner vacancy rate was 0.4% and the rental vacancy rate was 4.4%.

Racial composition as of the 2020 census
Race	Number	Percent
White	3,330	59.0%
Black or African American	580	10.3%
American Indian and Alaska Native	47	0.8%
Asian	589	10.4%
Native Hawaiian and Other Pacific Islander	5	0.1%
Some other race	290	5.1%
Two or more races	799	14.2%
Hispanic or Latino (of any race)	1,030	18.3%

=== 2010 census ===
The United States Census Bureau initially defined the Dove Valley CDP for the United States Census 2010.

Dove Valley CDP, Colorado
Year	Pop.	±%
2010	5,243	—
2020	5,640	+7.6%
Source: United States Census Bureau

== Economy ==
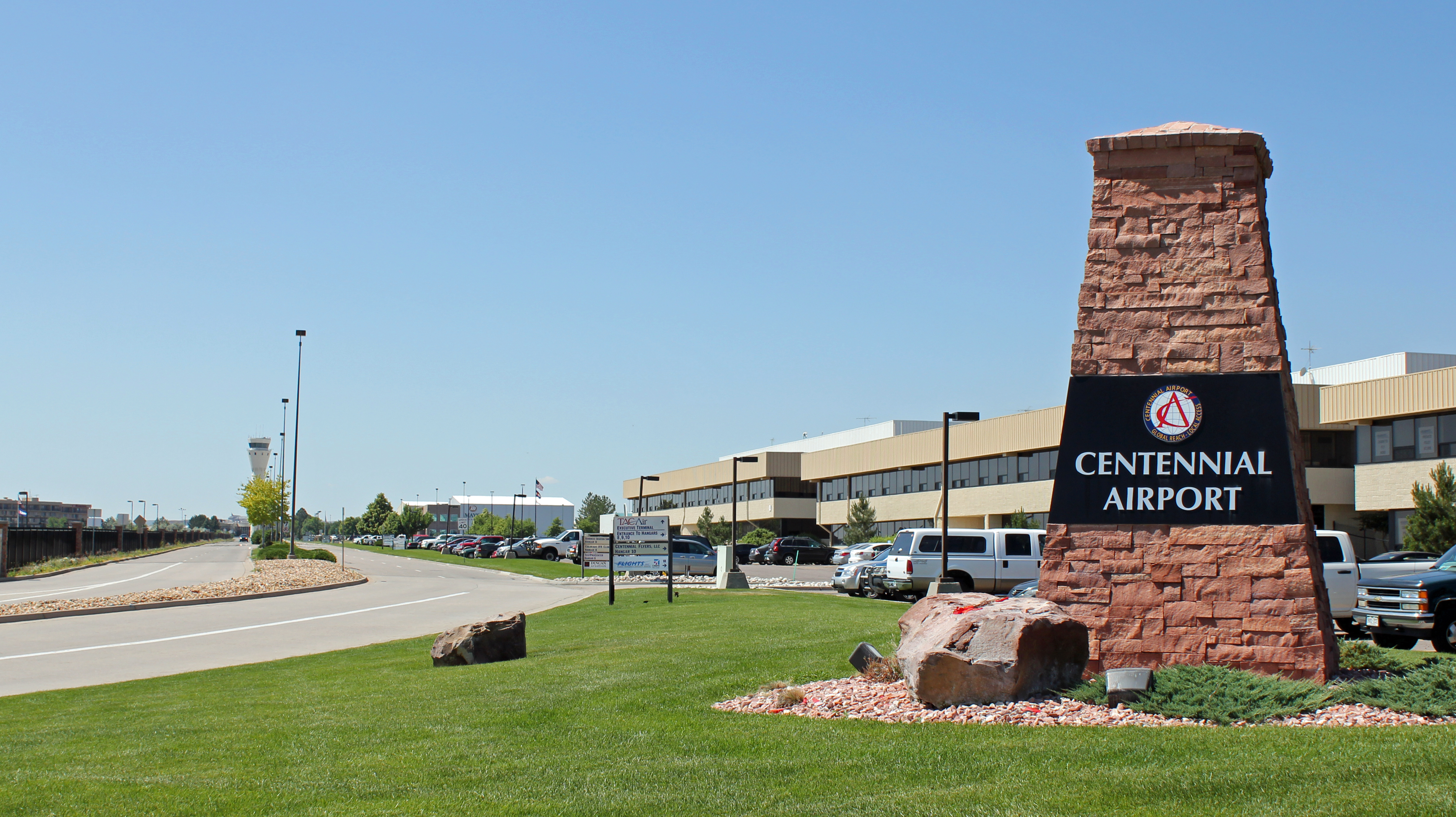
Centennial Airport

The headquarters and training camp of the Denver Broncos, as well as Centennial Airport, are located in Dove Valley. Air Methods and Key Lime Air have their corporate headquarters in the CDP as well. The indoor tennis facility the Randy Ross Tennis Center is also right in the heart of Dove Valley.

Air Methods's headquarters were previously in the CDP, on the airport property; it moved to Greenwood Village, Colorado in 2017.

== Education ==
Dove Valley is in Cherry Creek School District 5.

School zones are as follows: Much of Dove Valley is zoned to Red Hawk Ridge Elementary School, Liberty Middle School, and Grandview High School. Some western portions are zoned to Walnut Hills Elementary School, Campus Middle School, and Cherry Creek High School.

== See also ==
- Front Range Urban Corridor
