= Bye Aerospace eFlyer 4 =

American electric aircraft

eFlyer 4

General information
- Type: Electric aircraft
- National origin: United States
- Manufacturer: Bye Aerospace
- Status: Under development (2021)

History
- Developed from: Bye Aerospace Sun Flyer 2

The Bye Aerospace eFlyer4, originally named the Bye Aerospace Sun Flyer 4, is an American electric aircraft under development by Bye Aerospace of Denver, Colorado. The design was announced at the 2017 AirVenture airshow in Oshkosh, Wisconsin. The aircraft will be type certified and supplied complete and ready-to-fly.

== Design and development ==
The eFlyer 4 was developed from the smaller two-seat Bye Aerospace eFlyer 2. It features a cantilever low-wing, a four-seat enclosed cockpit under a bubble canopy, fixed tricycle landing gear with wheel pants and a single electric motor in tractor configuration.

The aircraft is made from composite material, predominantly carbon fiber reinforced polymer. Its 38 ft (11.6 m) span wing has an area of 120 sq ft (11 m^{2}) and mounts flaps. The standard engine used is a 105 kW (141 hp) electric powerplant. The aircraft will have ten batteries giving it a four-hour endurance. The design includes a ballistic parachute and has a 46 in (117 cm) wide cabin. The launch customer for the design is the Spartan College of Aeronautics and Technology which also has the eFlyer 2 on order for the flight training role.

With a payload of 850 lb (390 kg), a cabin width of 46 in (120 cm) and direct operating costs of $19.8 per hour, the 165 kn (306 km/h) all-electric four-seater is pitched for air taxi service around Los Angeles, San Francisco, Dallas, and Miami.

Development should follow completion of the smaller eFlyer 2 two-seat trainer. Bye received 220 orders for the two models by October 2018 and at that time forecast that a prototype should fly in mid-2019.

At AirVenture in July 2021 George Bye of Bye Aerospace stated that the eFlyer 4 will be certified in late 2023 or early 2024.

=== Orders ===
- Spartan College of Aeronautics and Technology
- BlackBird, 100 aircraft
- Quantum Air, 22 aircraft

== Specifications (eFlyer 4) ==
Data from Manufacturer and AOPA

General characteristics

- Crew: one
- Capacity: three passengers
- Wingspan: 38 ft (12 m)
- Wing area: 120 sq ft (11 m^{2})
- Powerplant: 1 × electric motor , 141 hp (105 kW)
- Propellers: 2-bladed composite

Performance

- Maximum speed: 175 kn (201 mph, 324 km/h)
- Endurance: 4 hrs
- Maximum glide ratio: 20:1
- Rate of climb: 1,250 ft/min (6.4 m/s)
- Wing loading: 22.5 lb/sq ft (110 kg/m^{2})

Avionics

- Avidyne IFD550
- iPad holder

== See also ==
- Pipistrel Panthera electric

Related lists

- List of electric aircraft
