= Aviation Technology Group =

American Aerospace Company

- Company type: Private
- Industry: Aerospace
- Founded: June 2000
- Founder: George E. Bye
- Fate: Defunct (2008)
- Headquarters: Englewood, Colorado, USA
- Key people: Charlie Johnson, President (former President of Cessna)
- Products: ATG Javelin
- Number of employees: 100+

Aviation Technology Group (ATG) was an American aerospace company. It developed the ATG Javelin very light jet (VLJ). Founded in June 2000 by George Bye, the company filed for bankruptcy in 2008 and then ceased to operate.

== Facilities ==
ATG was headquartered at Centennial Airport, with manufacturing facilities at Front Range Airport in neighboring Aurora. The postal designation of nearby Englewood is used as the company's mailing address.

On August 23, 2005, Will Schippers, ATG's CFO, reported that ATG signed contracts to lease two buildings located at Front Range Airport. “These buildings will be interim facilities until we build permanent production facilities currently planned for 2009.”

ATG was leasing approximately 56,000 square feet (5,200 m^{2}) at Front Range Airport. The first building was a 21,600-square-foot (2,010 m^{2}) facility, and was being used by ATG Flight Operations to manufacture four FAA conforming Javelin aircraft as well as serving as test facility headquarters.

The adjacent building was being used to assemble production aircraft. ATG anticipated production of up to 10 planes at a time in the 34,400-square-foot (3,200 m^{2}) facility. When production reached full capacity for these facilities, ATG expected to have hired up to 150 new employees.

== Company demise ==
As of November 5, 2007, there were 153 positions on the waiting list for the ATG Javelin.

ATG halted all further development on the Javelin in December 2007 after failing to get $200 million to finance further development. ATG laid off 80% of its employees and halted development operations on December 17, 2007. On May 27, 2008 ATG filed for Chapter 7 Bankruptcy, ending development of the Javelin.
