= Transcend Air Vy 400 =

Vy 400

General information
- Type: Tiltwing convertible
- National origin: United States
- Manufacturer: Transcend Air

History
- Introduction date: planned 2023
- Developed into: Vy 421

The Transcend Air Vy 400 is a tiltwing convertible aircraft under development by American startup Transcend Air.

== Development ==
In September 2018, Transcend was flying two electric-powered, one-fifth-scale prototypes to evaluate aerodynamics of the vertical and forward flight transition. It should be followed by a half-scale prototype powered by a smaller PT6 to demonstrate the drive train. A 2019 Series A round would fund a full-scale crewed prototype flying in 18–24 months, for a 2023 end certification. A manufacturing partner is sought to certify the aircraft for $350–500 million and produce it. By November 2018, Transcend had selected VerdeGo Aero to provide hybrid electric propulsion systems after the turbine version.

The company wants to establish a short-haul scheduled airline between barges in 46 cities like Boston-New York/Washington, San Francisco-Los Angeles/San Diego or Montreal-Toronto, for less door-to-door cost than the combined cost of existing airlines plus ground transport while avoiding paying for an empty re-positioning leg like air charters, but is skeptical about the on-demand model behind urban air mobility.

In August 2023, Transcend Air announced the development of a larger model, the Vy 421, powered by twin CT7-8 engines. The aircraft has been redesigned to carry seven passengers.

== Design ==
The aircraft would be certified under the FAR Part 23 commuter category, with industry standards for compliance and elements of helicopters FAR Part 27. Steep approaches and departures is intended to minimize noise and airspace issues.

Its single 1,700 hp (1,300 kW) Pratt & Whitney Canada PT6-67F turboshaft from the drives wingtip proprotors via gearboxes and shafts, with collective and a 40 hp (30 kW) electric tail fan for flight controls with fly-by-wire envelope protection. The cabin is larger than a high-performance turboprop single like the TBM 930 with 23 in (580 mm) wide seats and enough leg room for 6 ft (1.8 m) tall passengers, and it would have landing skids not wheels.

With a maximum takeoff weight of 6,990 lb (3,170 kg) and a useful load of 2,200 lb (1,000 kg) for fuel and a payload of five 200 lb (91 kg) passengers with overnight bags, its range would be 450 mi (390 nmi; 720 km) at 405 mph (352 kn; 652 km/h).

== Specifications ==
Data from Transcend Air

General characteristics

- Crew: 1
- Capacity: 5 passengers
- Empty weight: 4,800 lb (2,177 kg)
- Max takeoff weight: 6,990 lb (3,171 kg)
- Fuel capacity: 960 lb (440 kg)
- Powerplant: 1 × Pratt & Whitney Canada PT6 turboshaft, 1,700 hp (1,300 kW)
- Powerplant: 1 × Yasa 750 electric motor, 40 hp (30 kW)

Performance

- Cruise speed: 405 mph (652 km/h, 352 kn)
- Range: 300–450 mi (480–720 km, 260–390 nmi)
- Service ceiling: 15,000 ft (4,600 m)
- Rate of climb: 4,500 ft/min (23 m/s)
- Rate of sink: 4,000 ft/min (20 m/s)

== See also ==
Aircraft of comparable role, configuration, and era

- AgustaWestland AW609
- XTI TriFan 600
