= The Mine (brand) =

TheMine.com
- Formerly: ATG Stores
- Company type: Private
- Industry: Online retail
- Founded: 1999
- Founder: Gary Rubens and Brad Halbach
- Defunct: 2018
- Fate: Acquired and absorbed by parent
- Successor: Lowe's Home Improvement
- Headquarters: Kirkland, Washington, United States
- Products: Decorative Lighting, Plumbing, Hardware, Furniture & Decor, Appliances, Bed & Bath, Flooring
- Website: www.themine.com

The Mine (formerly ATG Stores) was an American e-commerce company which sold home goods. The company was founded in 1999 and went on to sell a variety of home items including lighting, fixtures, hardware, furniture, and home decor.

The company was acquired by Lowe's Home Improvement in 2010. All the business names were rebranded as The Mine in 2017. In March 2018 the site was folded into the main website of the parent company Lowe's seeing an end to the company and brand.

Prior to its acquisition the company's headquarters were in Kirkland, Washington.

== History ==
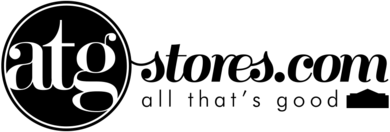
Original logo used until 2016

ATG Stores was founded in 1999 with the launch of its first website, Lighting Universe, with the goal to consolidate lighting catalogs and pricing online for designers, homeowners and contractors. In 2000 LightingUniverse.com went live, and 5 years later ATG Stores launched FixtureUniverse.com, targeting plumbing fixtures and decorative bath products.

In 2006 Allied Trade Group, Inc. was formed as the parent company of Lighting Universe and Fixture Universe with the goal to grow into a full line home furnishings supplier. ATG Stores added 4 stores in the beginning of 2008 and at one point encompassed around 500 websites in multiple home furnishing, utility and categories, specializing in product sales of a variety of brand name manufacturers.

ATG Stores opened their first brick and mortar showroom in May 2004 in Kirkland, Washington, and their second showroom was purchased from The Lighting Co in August 2004. There were as many as seven ATG retail showrooms, all of which have closed.

Lowe's Home Improvement acquired ATG Stores on December 29, 2011 with the intention of expanding the product variety available to Lowe's stores and Lowes.com while also bringing more traffic and credibility to ATG Stores as an online e-tailer. This initiated the closing of the ATG Stores retail showrooms in Washington state and allowed for Lowe's customers to purchase ATG Stores items in-store for pickup.

In April 2017, ATG Stores rebranded to The Mine, and added a personal concierge service to their online shopping offering.

ATG Stores had been on Inc. magazine's fastest growing companies list twice. Once in 124th place in 2006 and once in 412th place in 2007. They have also received recognition by the Puget Sound Business Journal: in 2006 they were ranked #16 and in 2007 ranked #31 on their list of fastest growing companies in the Northwest.

In 2018, the parent company Lowe's deicide to fold The Mine into its own main website, effectively signalling the end of the company and the brand.
