= ATG Javelin =

American-Israeli civil jet aircraft prototype

Javelin
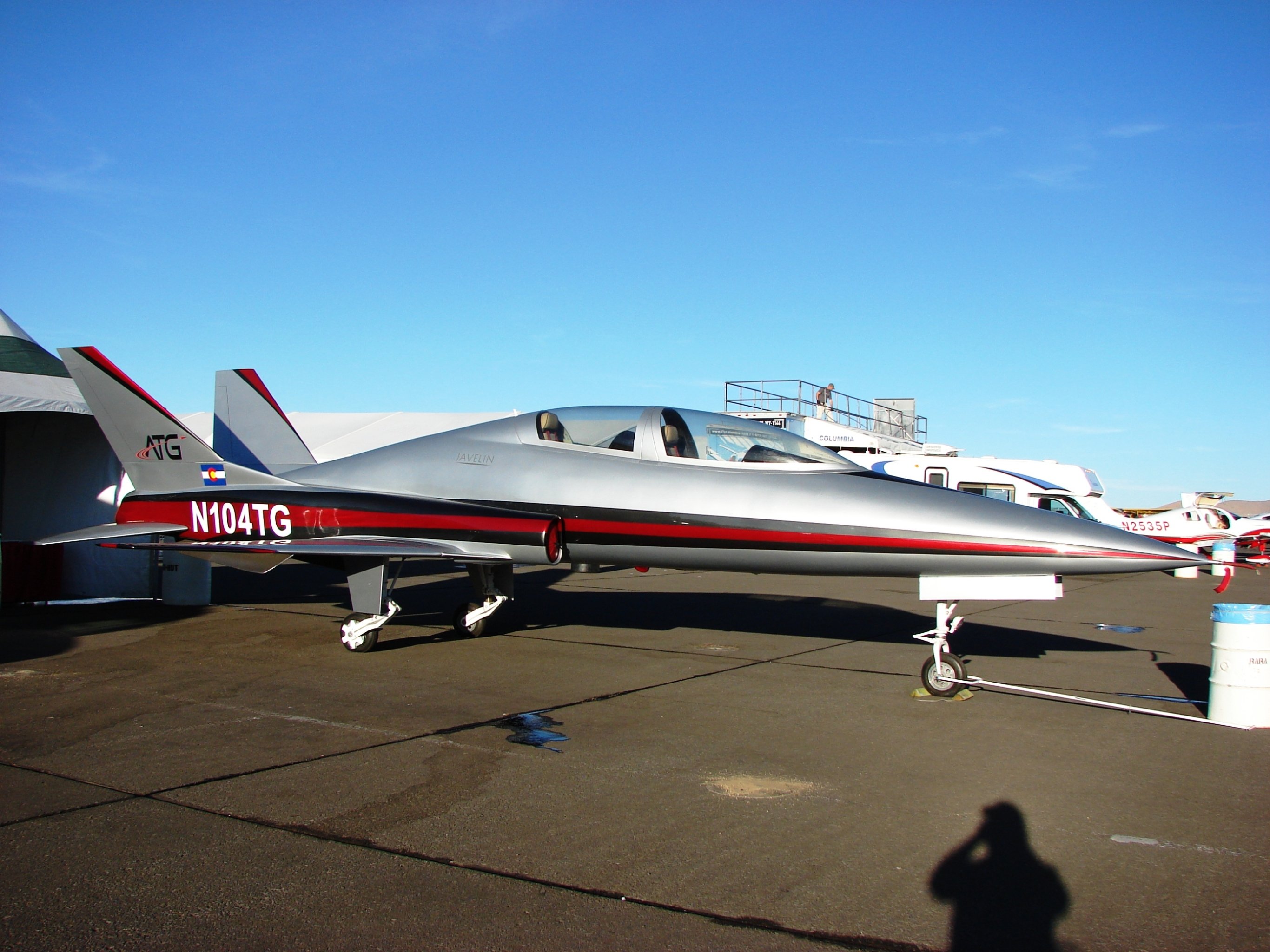
- Javelin mockup on display at Reno Air Show

General information
- Type: Civil utility aircraft and Military
- Manufacturer: Aviation Technology Group
- Status: Canceled

History
- First flight: September 30, 2005

The ATG Javelin was an American small high-speed personal jet that was developed by the Aviation Technology Group (ATG) prior to its bankruptcy. Planned for FAA certification under 14 CFR part 23, the Javelin had a design resembling a fighter aircraft, an unusual concept for civilian jets. The Javelin MK-20 derivative, developed in cooperation between ATG and Israel Aerospace Industries, was expected to fill the jet trainer role for various air forces. The first prototype took flight on 30 September 2005, flown by retired Air Force Lt. Col. and test pilot Robert Fuschino.

ATG halted all further development on the Javelin in December 2007 after failing to get $200 million to finance further development. The company subsequently declared bankruptcy in 2008, ending the development of the Javelin.

Javelin design rights were bought by Rud Aero, a very small airplane manufacturer. They had partnered with another very small firm, Stavatti Aerospace to offer a variant of the Javelin for the U.S. Air Force's T-X program. This proved unsuccessful, with the Boeing–Saab T-7 Red Hawk being selected by the US Air Force on 27 September 2018.

== Specifications (Javelin MK-10) ==
General characteristics

- Crew: 2
- Capacity: 2
- Length: 37 ft 0 in (11.28 m)
- Wingspan: 25 ft 1 in (7.65 m)
- Height: 10 ft 6 in (3.20 m)
- Wing area: 140 sq ft (13 m^{2})
- Empty weight: 4,655 lb (2,111 kg)
- Max takeoff weight: 6,900 lb (3,130 kg)
- Powerplant: 2 × Williams FJ33-4-19J turbofans, 1,750 lbf (7.8 kN) thrust each

Performance

- Maximum speed: 500 kn (575 mph, 925 km/h)
- Range: 1,000 nmi (1,151 mi, 1,852 km)
- Service ceiling: 45,000 ft (13,700 m)
- Rate of climb: 9,000 ft/min (46 m/s)
- Wing loading: 46 lb/sq ft (220 kg/m^{2})
- Thrust/weight: 0.56

== See also ==
- Very light jet

Aircraft of comparable role, configuration, and era

- Bede BD-10
- Viper Aircraft ViperJet
