= Tank leak detection =

Tank leak detection is implemented to alert the operator to a suspected release from any part of a storage tank system, what enables to prevent from soil contamination and loss of product.

In many countries regulated UST are required to have an approved leak detection method so that leaks are discovered quickly and the release is stopped in time.

== Leak detection standards in Europe ==
European Committee for Standardization EN 13160 shows five different classes (technical methods) of leak detection systems to be used on tanks and pipes.

The number of the class indicates the effectiveness of the installed leak detection system. Class 1 being the highest and class 5 being the lowest level.

=== Class 1 ===
System inherently safe. Leak is detected before any liquid enters the environment. These systems detect a leak above or below the liquid level of a double wall system. Once a leak is detected, fuel can be removed from the tank before any product enters the environment.

=== Class 2 ===
System that monitors pressure of a liquid filling the interstitial space of a double wall system. The system alarms on any leak. However, once the tank is breached, the liquid contaminates the product or flows into the ground - in both situations contamination cannot be prevented.

=== Class 3 ===
Liquid/vapour sensors are placed at the lowest point in a system and detect the presence of liquid or hydrocarbon vapour within the interstitial space. Once a leak is detected an alarm will sound. The sensors cannot detect the failure of outer wall. The product may enter the environment.

=== Class 4 ===
The system analyses rates of change in tank contents (i.e. leakage into or out of the tank). If a leak is found when operating on a single wall system, the product will always be released to the environment before the leak is detected.

For tanks there are 2 subclasses of the system.

4a System based on fuel reconciliation (measurement of amount sold through the dispenser against the amount that goes out of the tank according to the tank gauge).Any discrepancies release an alarm.

4b Detection of tank leak in quiet periods (liquid level is changing while the tank is not dispensing fuel).

=== Class 5 ===
In this system monitoring wells with installed sensors are located around the tank site. The sensors detect a leak from the installation. As in case of class 4, the product will always be released to the environment before the leak is detected.

== Leak detection standards in the USA ==
In the USA, the Environmental Protection Agency (EPA) requires owners and operators detect releases from their UST systems. EPA allows three categories of release detection: interstitial, internal, and external. These three categories include seven release detection methods.

- Interstitial method – secondary containment with interstitial monitoring; secondary containment and under-dispenser containment
- Internal methods – automatic tank gauging (ATG) systems; statistical inventory reconciliation (SIR); continuous in-tank leak detection
- External method – monitoring for vapors in the soil; monitoring for liquids on the groundwater

== Leak detection methods ==
- Automatic Tank Gauging (ATG) – the basic function of the system is to monitor the fuel level tanks permanently to see if the tank is leaking. A probe installed in the tank is linked electronically to a nearby control device where received data (product level and temperature) are recorded and automatically analyzed. These systems automatically calculate the changes in product volume that can indicate a leaking tank.

The ATG must be operated in one of the following modes:

- Inventory mode – activities of an in-service tank together with deliveries are recorded.
- Test mode – the test is performed when the tank is shut down and there is no dispensing or delivery. The product level and temperature are measured for at least one hour. However, some systems, known as continuous ATGS, do not require the tank to be taken out of service to perform a test.

There are methods combining automatic tank gauges with statistical inventory reconciliation where gauge provides liquid level and temperature data to a computer running SIR software, which performs the analysis to detect leaks.

- Statistical Inventory Reconciliation (SIR)

SIR was born in the early 1980s. In SIR methods statistical techniques are applied to inventory, delivery and dispensed data collected over time and are used to determine whether or not a tank system is leaking. On a regular basis, information about the current tank level and complete records of withdrawals and deliveries to UST are proceeded and calculated with the use of computer program that performs a statistical analysis of received data. Replacing simple arithmetic with appropriate statistical procedures allows the leak detection capability of inventory reconciliation to be considerably improved. SIR vendors must demonstrate that they can detect leaks of 0.2 gallons per hour in order to be acceptable as a monthly leak detection method. Such solution enables not only detected tank leakage but also possible theft, over-dispensing or short deliveries.

- Vapour Monitoring

Vapour Monitoring detects fumes from leaked product in the soil around the leaked tank. It can be categorised into 2 types. Active Monitoring where special tracer chemical added to the UST are detected. Passive Monitoring measures product vapours in the soil around the UST. Special monitoring wells or sampling points must be placed in the tank backfill. A minimum of two wells is recommended for a single tank excavation. Three or more wells are recommended for an excavation with two or more tanks. Used equipment can immediately analyse a gathered vapour or only gather a sample which is then analysed in the laboratory. The system is not inherently safe - by the time the vapor sensors go to alarm, the contamination has likely already occurred.

- Interstitial Monitoring

The method requires a secondary containment, it can be a double wall of the UST where the outer tank wall provides a barrier between the inner tank and the environment. Interstitial methods include the use of a hydrocarbon-sensitive sensor cables or probes connected to a monitoring console. Once the hydrocarbons is detected an alarm goes off. The other method is vacuum monitoring where vapour sensor monitors interstitial spaces of the tank. In case of the leakage the vacuum of the space begins to change. It is also possible to partially fill the interstitial space of the tank with a monitoring fluid (brine or glycol solutions ). Once the level of the fluid changes, a leak may be present.

- Monitoring for Contamination in Groundwater

Monitoring wells are placed close to the UST and allow continuous measurements for leaked product. This methods enables to detect the presence of liquid product floating on the groundwater. The wells can be monitored periodically (at least once every 30-days) with hand-held equipment or with the use of permanently installed monitoring devices. This method cannot be used at sites where groundwater is more than 20 feet below the surface and the subsurface soil or backfill material (or both) consists of gravels, coarse to medium sands, or other similarly permeable materials. A minimum of two wells is recommended for a single tank excavation. Three or more wells are recommended for an excavation with two or more tanks. Product is released to the environment before a leak is detected.

- Manual Tank Gauging

The method requires keeping the tank undisturbed (no liquid is added/subtracted) for a designated period (e.g. 36hours). The length of the testing period depends on the size of the tank and whether the method is used alone or in combination with tank tightness testing. During this period the contents of the tank are measured manually twice, at the beginning and at the end of the period. Significant changes in the volume of the tank’s contents over the test period can indicate a possible leak.
