= Redbird Flight Simulations =

American flight training company

- Founded: 2006
- Headquarters: Austin, Texas, United States
- Key people: Jerry Gregoire (founder & co-chairman); Craig Fuller (co-chairman); Todd Willinger (CEO); Charlie Gregoire (president)
- Products: Flight simulators

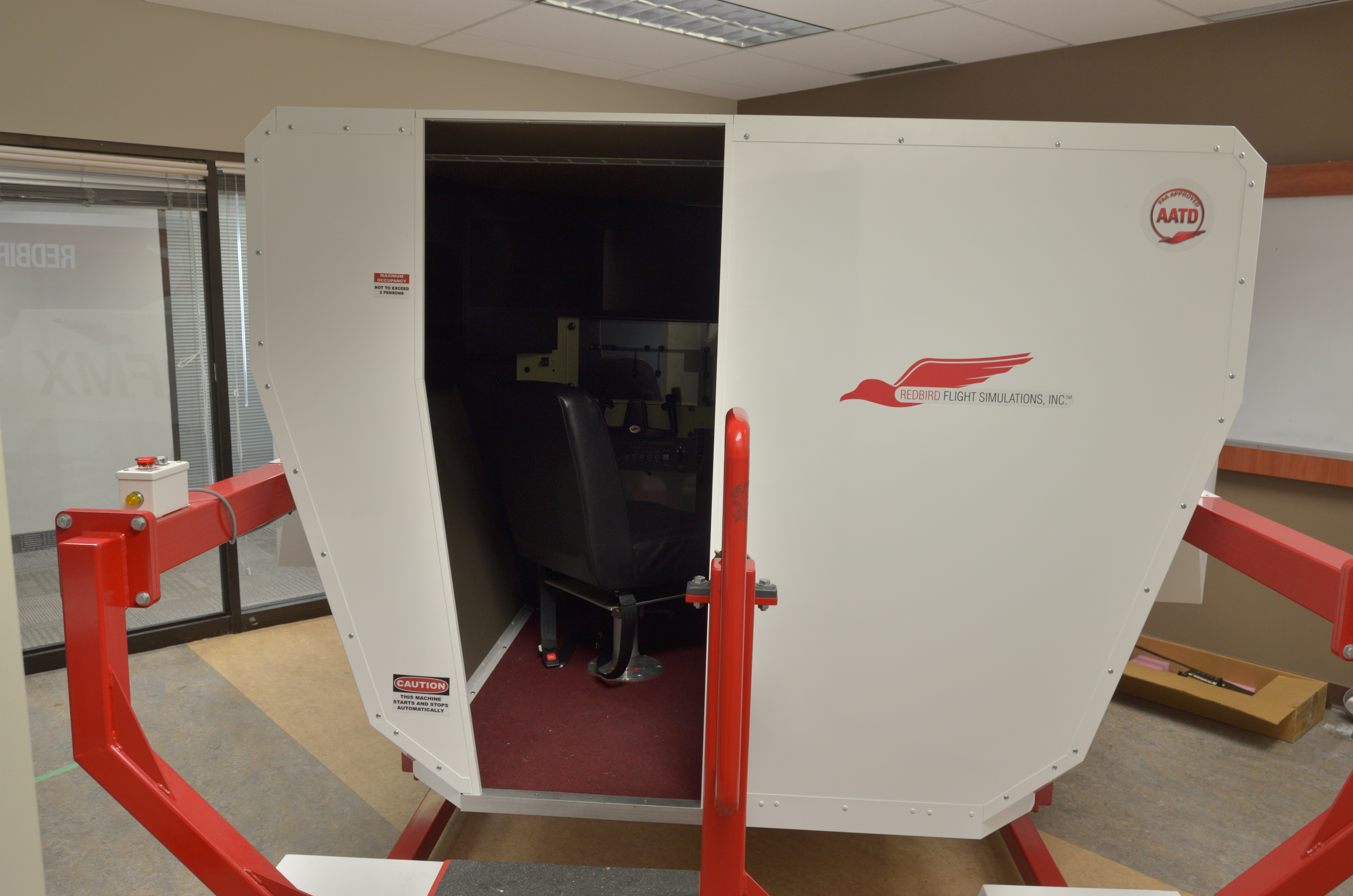
Redbird FMX Flight Simulator

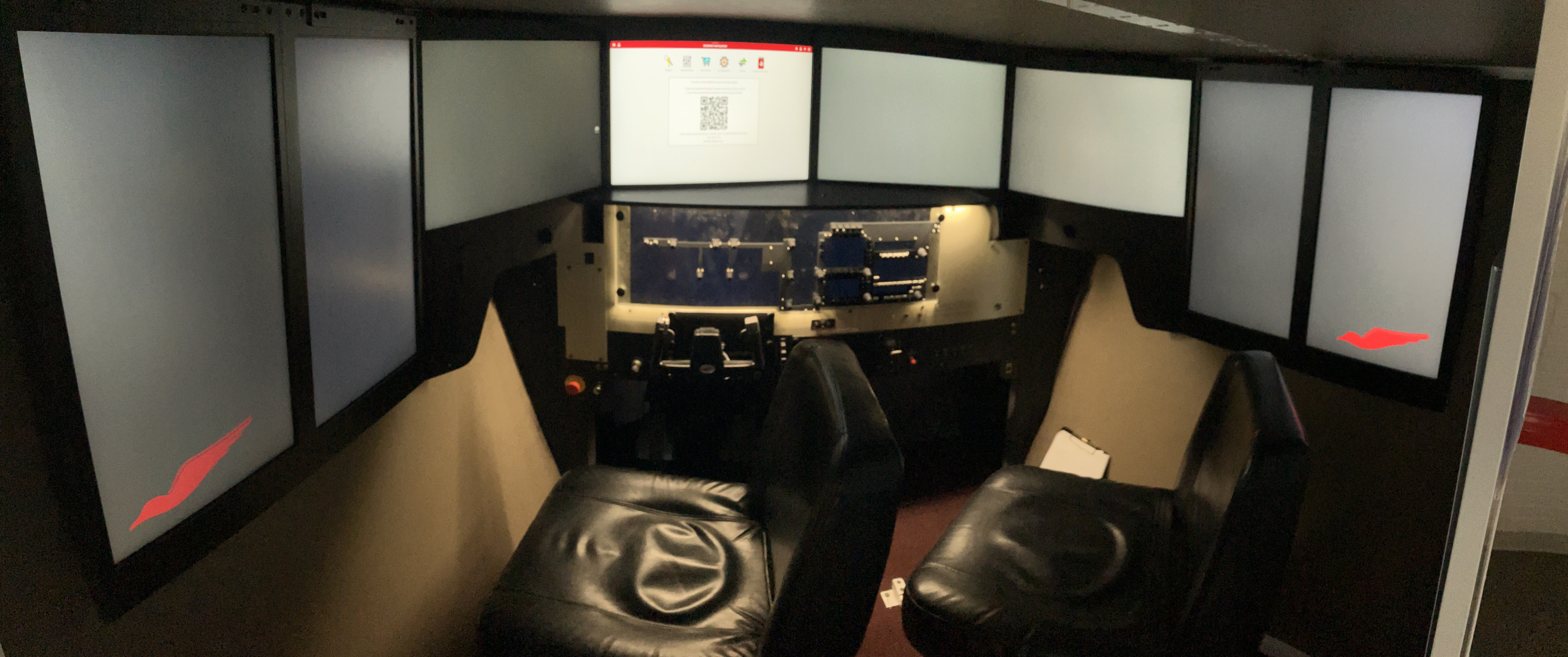
Interior of a Redbird FMX flight simulator

Redbird Flight Simulations, Inc. is an American flight training company.

Founded in 2006, Redbird Flight started with a flight simulator built around a scrapped airplane fuselage - a Cessna 177 Cardinal, from which the name "redbird" originates.

The Redbird FMX is the largest selling simulator in history, with more than 320 units delivered worldwide as of 2012.

As of 2018, Redbird has sold and delivered over 1,200 aviation training devices to 30+ countries, more than any other manufacturer to date.

Products:

- AOPA Jay - A self-contained simulator with a PC core, monitor, flight controls, and Lockheed Martin modified Microsoft FSX software.
- RedHawk - An extensive overhaul conversion program using a Cessna 172 with a diesel engine, upgraded avionics, new paint and interior.
- Alloy - RD1 Rudder Pedals designed to mimic real in-flight pedal control.
- FMX - Full motion Advanced Aviation Training Device with a single or multi-glass (or analog) configuration.
- Redbird CAPS - An add-on device that gives pilots the chance to learn how and when to deploy the Cirrus Airframe Parachute System.
