= Liaoning Ruixiang RX1E =

Chinese electric aircraft

RX1E

General information
- Type: Electric aircraft
- National origin: China
- Manufacturer: Liaoning Ruixiang General Aviation Manufacture Company Limited

History
- Manufactured: 2015-present
- Introduction date: November 2012

The Liaoning Ruixiang RX1E is a Chinese two-seat electric aircraft, designed by the Liaoning General Aviation Academy at Shenyang Aerospace University and manufactured by the Liaoning Ruixiang General Aviation Manufacture Company Limited of Shenyang.

The aircraft was first shown at the Zhuhai China Airshow, in November 2012 and in 2015 at the AERO Friedrichshafen show in Germany.

== Design and development ==
The result of a three-year development process started in June 2012, the RX1E is an electric powered, two-seat side-by-side configuration, carbon fibre composite construction aircraft with a T-tail and tricycle landing gear and is one of the first electric airplanes in production. The company said in April 2015 that they had 28 orders for the design.

The manufacturer claims that the aircraft conforms to US Light-sport Aircraft requirements and has a Type Design Approval from the Civil Aviation Administration of China, issued in 2015. As of September 2016 it does not appear on the US Federal Aviation Administration list of approved LSAs and, in fact, the category excludes electric-powered aircraft and requires a single reciprocating engine.

The first two customer aircraft were delivered in June 2015. The launch customer was the Liaoning Ruixiang General Aviation Co., which will employ the aircraft in the flight training role.

An improved version, the RX1E-A, was first flown in November 2017 and features a two-hour endurance and a new ballistic parachute design. The original RX1E has a 45-minute endurance.

== Specifications (RX1E) ==
Data from Tacke

General characteristics

- Crew: one
- Capacity: one passenger
- Length: 6.58 m (21 ft 7 in)
- Wingspan: 14.5 m (47 ft 7 in)
- Height: 2.45 m (8 ft 0 in)
- Wing area: 12 m^{2} (130 sq ft)
- Empty weight: 270 kg (595 lb)
- Gross weight: 500 kg (1,102 lb)
- Propellers: 2-bladed wooden fixed pitch

Performance

- Cruise speed: 110 km/h (68 mph, 59 kn)
- Stall speed: 73 km/h (45 mph, 39 kn)
- Never exceed speed: 160 km/h (99 mph, 86 kn)
- Endurance: 60 minutes
- Service ceiling: 1,400 m (4,600 ft)
- Wing loading: 41.7 kg/m^{2} (8.5 lb/sq ft)

== See also ==
- Aero Electric Sun Flyer
- Pipistrel Alpha Electro
