= XTI TriFan 600 =

US vertical takeoff and landing aircraft

TriFan 600
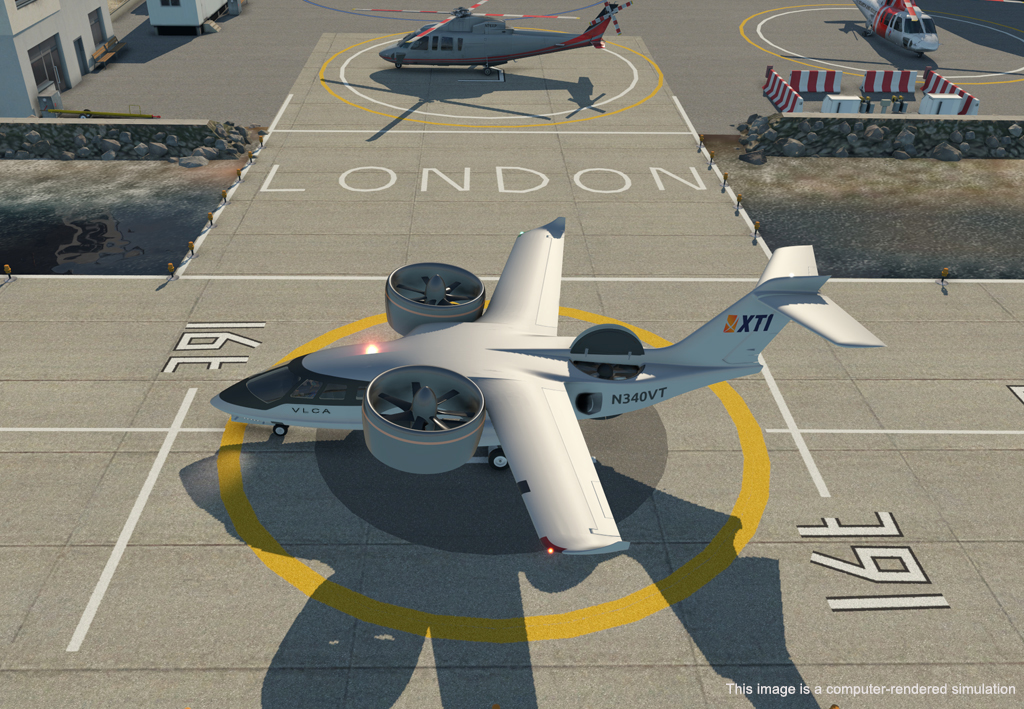
- Computer-rendered simulation

General information
- Type: VTOL aircraft
- National origin: United States
- Designer: XTI Aircraft Company
- Status: Under development

The XTI TriFan 600 is a vertical takeoff and landing aircraft currently under development by XTI Aircraft Company. The TriFan 600 is referred to as a Vertical Lift Crossover Airplane (VLCA) by XTI to differentiate its range and speed from the many short-range, low-speed electric VTOL (eVTOL) aircraft under development.

== Development ==
Under a contract with XTI, Trek Aerospace manufactured the fuselage and wings, and assembled the company's 65% scale proof-of-concept, powered by an XTI-Trek Aerospace battery pack. MGM Compro, based in Zlín, Czechia, supplied its electric motors and controllers. It was completed in December 2018 and unveiled in January 2019.

In 2019, the company initiated a series of ground tests of its proof-of-concept at Placerville Airport, California, to validate the electric motors, battery systems, ducts, propellers, flight controls, systems, and instrumentation. It first flew tethered on May 2, 2019, and conducted multiple controlled hovers at Placerville. Based on test data, modifications were made to the proof-of-concept vehicle, and it was then disassembled and transported to the Northrop Grumman private airport site near Howell, Utah, in December 2019. Testing resumed after reassembly in early 2020, but further testing was severely impacted by the COVID-19 pandemic, and the decision was made to focus on the full-scale piloted prototype development instead.

In its quest for sustainable aviation, XTI researched hybrid-electric propulsion (all-electric for the longer-range missions envisioned for the TriFan 600 are not possible with batteries alone) using one turboshaft engine and battery packs, and later with hydrogen fuel cells. The company concluded that given uncertainties around the technical maturity of novel propulsion systems, an evolving regulatory environment, and the need to develop an entirely new battery/hydrogen charging infrastructure network, it was prudent to de-risk the program by first seeking FAA certification with two reliable, proven turboshaft engines capable of operating on 100% sustainable aviation fuels (SAF). This results in an 80% reduction in lifecycle CO_{2} emissions, and allows the TriFan 600 to be immediately deployed worldwide upon entry into service using existing infrastructure. As technology matures and becomes commercially viable, regulations are clearly defined, and charging infrastructure developed, the company intends to incorporate hybrid-electric and eventually all-electric propulsion in the TriFan 600. First piloted test flights of the full-scale prototype are projected to commence in 2026.

On July 24, 2023, XTI Aircraft and Inpixon, a provider of real-time locating systems, entered into a definitive merger agreement, which if completed will result in a combined publicly traded company that will focus on advancing the XTI TriFan 600 to market, as well as continuing to offer Inpixon's real-time location systems technology to manufacturing and warehousing facilities for streamlined operations, greater efficiency, and improved safety. The proposed merger is expected to be completed by the fourth quarter of 2023. As of August 2023, XTI has received more than 700 conditional pre-orders under a combination of aircraft purchase agreements, non-binding reservation deposit agreements, and options. These pre-orders represent potential gross revenues of approximately $7.1 billion.

== Design ==
The TriFan 600 has seating for a pilot plus up to six passengers. An air medical interior will accommodate two pilots, and a stretcher patient and up to three attendants in the cabin. It is a fixed-wing airplane capable of VTOL - a “crossover” airplane. It will be powered by two turboshaft engines operating three ducted fans: two pivoting on a cross-shaft forward of the wings and one in the aft fuselage, lifting the aircraft in VTOL mode. The pivoting forward fans allow the TriFan to operate conventionally from a runway like an airplane, or to position the forward ducted fans at intermediate angles to take advantage of any available runway to increase payload and range. The forward ducted fans are 7 ft (2.1 m) diameter and the aft ducted fan is 5 ft (1.5 m) in diameter.

The TriFan 600 will be certified to operate IFR (Instrument Flight Rules - inclement weather operations) and in flight in known icing conditions (FIKI). It is planned to operate up to 25,000 ft. altitude, and at speeds up to 300 kts (345 mph/555 kph). Helipad-to-helipad VTOL range is projected to be 600 nm (700 mi/1100 km) and conventional takeoff and landing (CTOL) range 750 nm (850 mi/1400 km).

== Specifications ==
Data from XTI Aircraft Company.

General characteristics

- Crew: 1-2
- Capacity: 1-7
- Length: 14.8 m (48.5 ft)
- Wingspan: 13.7 m (44.9 ft)

Performance

- Maximum speed: 555 km/h (345 mph, 300 kn)
- Range: 1,100 km (690 mi, 600 nmi) in VTOL, 750 nmi (1,390 km) from a runway
- Service ceiling: 7,600 m (25,000 ft)

== See also ==
Aircraft of comparable role, configuration, and era

- AgustaWestland Project Zero
- Lilium Jet
- Transcend Air Vy 400
