= PC-Aero Elektra One =

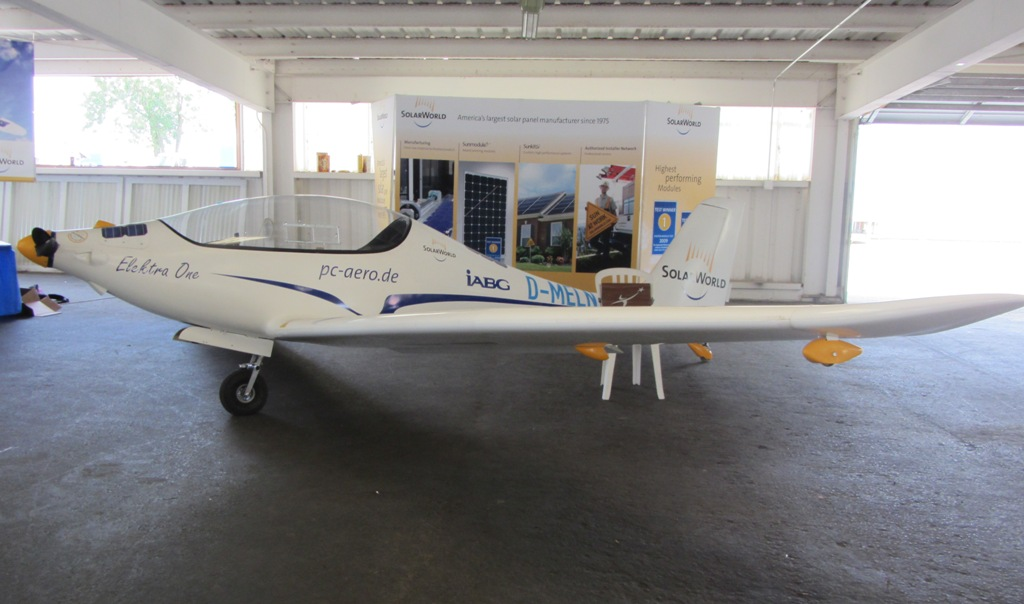

General information
- Type: Electric aircraft
- National origin: Germany
- Manufacturer: PC-Aero
- Designer: Calin Gologan

History
- First flight: 21 March 2011

The PC-Aero Elektra One is a single seat, electric powered composite aircraft.

A mockup was constructed by ES-Technik and shown at the AERO Friedrichshafen show in 2010.

== Design and development ==
The Elektra One was built with support from Solar Hangar and Solar World. The business concept is to produce electricity for the aircraft from solar panel equipped hangars with excess energy fed back into the power grid.

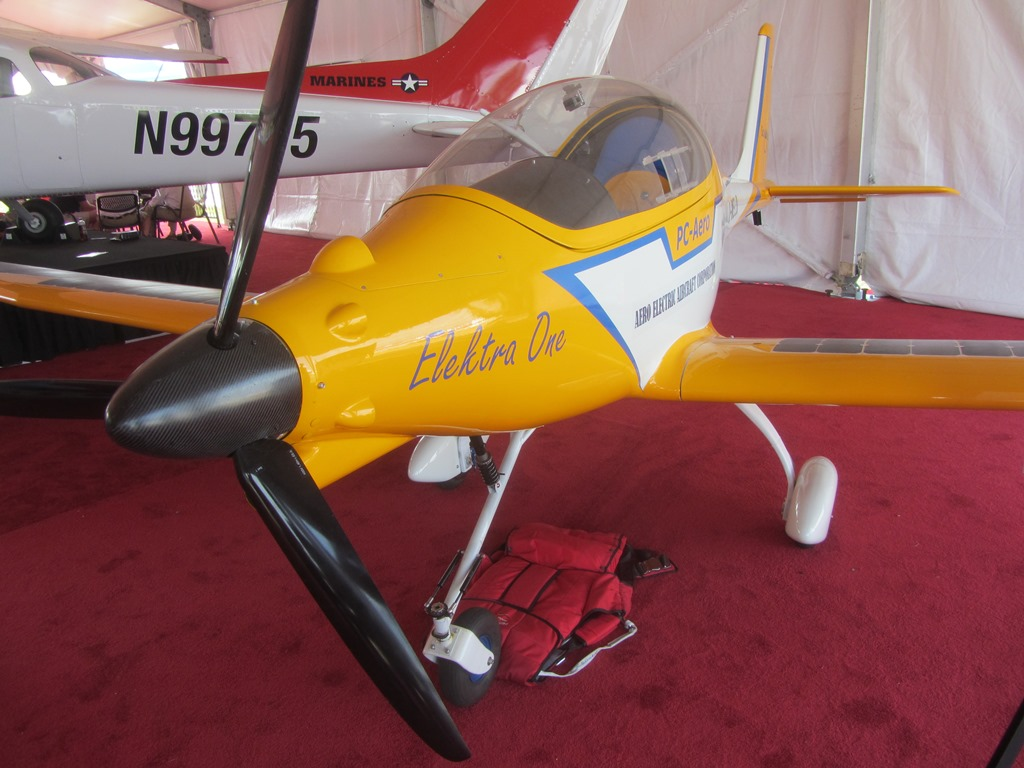
PC-Aero Elektra One Tri Gear

The Elektra One has a four-hour endurance with onboard lithium batteries and solar panels. A tricycle gear variant was displayed in 2014.

The company has planned two-seat and four-seat versions, to be called the Elektra Two and Four.

== Operational history ==
The Elektra One was test flown in March 2011, using 3 kW of power. In August 2011, the Elektra One won the Lindbergh electric aircraft prize presented at the EAA AirVenture airshow in July 2011.

== Variants ==
Elektra One
Single seat
Sun Flyer
Two-seat trainer - (proposed) 1320 lb gross, 616 lb empty, 3 hr range in optimal solar conditions.

== Specifications (PC-Aero Elektra One) ==
Data from PC Aero

General characteristics

- Crew: one
- Wingspan: 8.6 m (28 ft 3 in)
- Wing area: 6.4 m^{2} (69 sq ft)
- Empty weight: 100 kg (220 lb)
- Gross weight: 300 kg (661 lb)

Performance

- Range: 500 km (310 mi, 270 nmi)
- Endurance: 3 hours
