= Centennial Airport =

Airport in Arapahoe and Douglas Counties, Colorado, United States

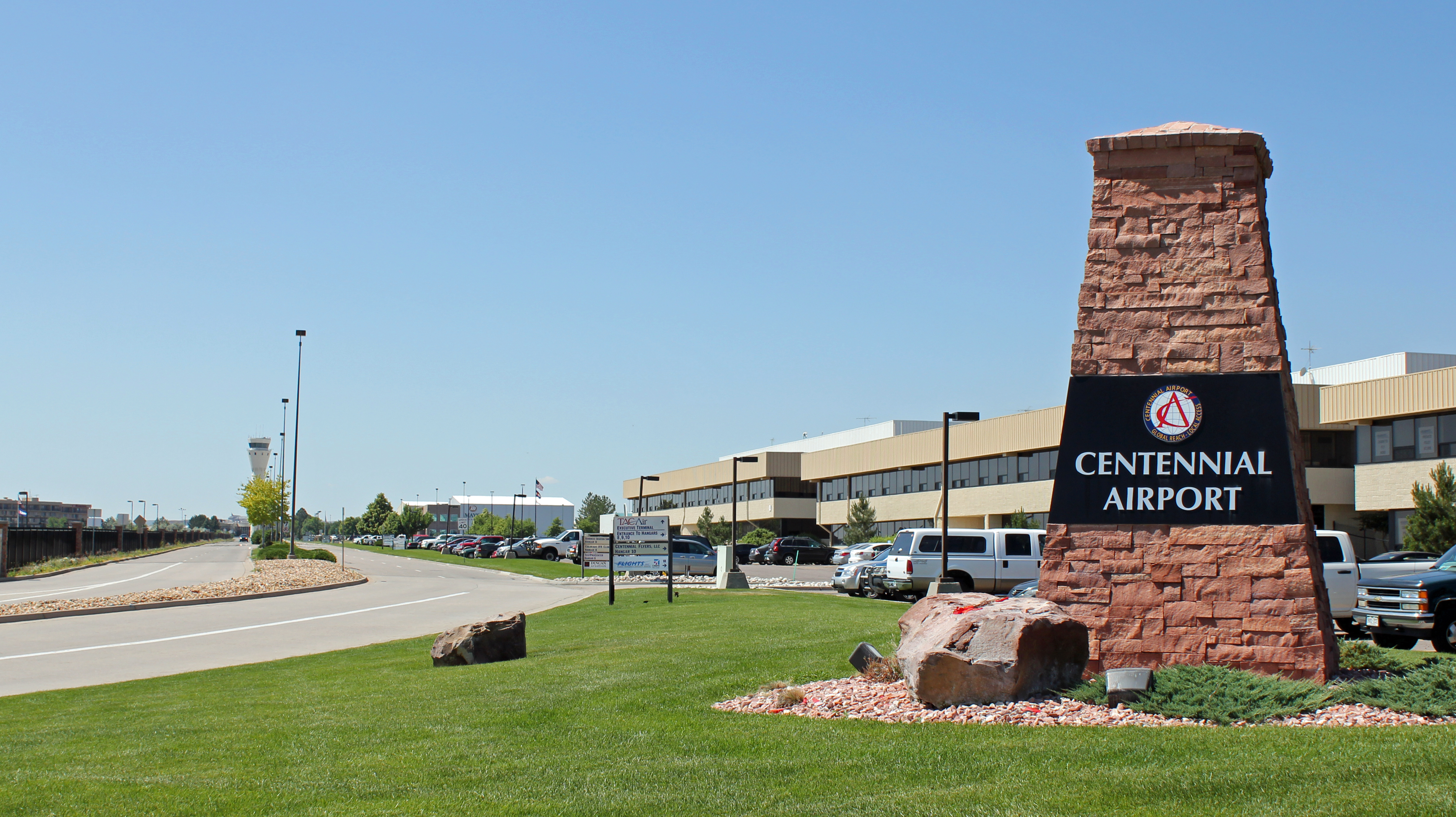
- IATA: APA; ICAO: KAPA; FAA LID: APA

Summary
- Airport type: Public
- Owner: Arapahoe County Public Airport Authority
- Serves: Denver metropolitan area
- Location: Dove Valley CDP and Meridian CDP, Colorado
- Elevation AMSL: 5,885 ft (1,794 m)
- Coordinates: 39°34′12″N 104°50′58″W
- Website: www.centennialairport.com

Maps
- FAA airport diagram

- Location of airport in Colorado APA/KAPA/APA (the United States)

Runways
Direction	Length		Surface
Direction	ft	m	Surface
17L/35R	10,000	3,048	Asphalt
17R/35L	7,001	2,134	Asphalt
10/28	4,800	1,463	Asphalt

Statistics (2018)
- Aircraft operations: 337,947
- Based aircraft: 840
- Source: Federal Aviation Administration

Centennial Airport (IATA: APA, ICAO: KAPA, FAA LID: APA) is a public use airport owned by the Arapahoe County Public Airport Authority in the Denver metropolitan area, 15 nmi (17 mi; 28 km) southeast of downtown Denver, Colorado, United States. Located primarily in Dove Valley, a census designated place (CDP) in Arapahoe County, the airport extends into Douglas County, with some of those portions in the Meridian CDP.

== Facilities ==
The airport opened on May 12, 1968, as Arapahoe County Airport, and was renamed on July 13, 1984. The new name reflects Colorado's admission to the Union as the 38th state in 1876, the centennial of the United States Declaration of Independence.

In 1985, a new control tower was built. It is an international airport with continuous U.S. Customs services and is one of the busiest general aviation airports in the United States with an average of 874 operations per day. The Federal Aviation Administration control tower provides air traffic control service 24/7. Runway 35R has an instrument landing system.

Centennial Airport covers 1,400 acres (567 ha) at an elevation of 5,885 feet (1,794 m). It has three asphalt runways: 17L/35R is 10,000 by 100 feet (3,048 x 30 m); 17R/35L is 7,001 by 77 feet (2,134 x 23 m); 10/28 is 4,800 by 75 feet (1,463 x 23 m). In 2018 the airport had 337,947 aircraft operations, averaging 925 per day: 89% general aviation, 10% air taxi, and 2% military. 840 aircraft were then based at this airport: 569 single-engine, 104 multi-engine, 147 jets, and 20 helicopters.

Key Lime Air has its corporate headquarters on the airport property. Air Methods did as well prior to moving to nearby Greenwood Village in 2017.

The National Plan of Integrated Airport Systems for 2011–2015 categorized the airport as a "reliever airport".

== Airlines and destinations ==
=== Passenger ===
Airlines	Destinations	Refs.
JSX	Las Vegas, Scottsdale; Seasonal: Dallas–Love	

== Accidents and incidents ==
- On November 19, 1979, a Cessna 500 Citation I operated by National Jet industries, a cargo flight, crashed on an improper IFR approach to runway 34 due to icing conditions. Two of the three occupants died.
- On July 2, 1984, a Bell 206B helicopter, N3173L, suddenly rolled over and crashed at Centennial Airport, killing the pilot and single passenger. Investigators found that the connector that retained the cyclic stick had broken due to a loose retaining nut, and attributed the accident to improper maintenance, with the manufacturer's inadequate preflight checklist being a contributing factor. Fifteen days after the crash, Bell Helicopter issued a safety notice advising operators to check quick removal flight controls for proper installation prior to flight—guidance which was previously omitted from the manufacturer's checklists.
- On March 26, 2001, a Socata TBM-700, N300WC, departed shortly after 07:00 local time under IFR rules in low-ceiling ice fog conditions. Radar and on-board GPS data indicated the airplane began drifting to the left of runway centerline almost immediately after takeoff. The airplane made a climbing left turn, achieving a maximum altitude of 7,072 feet and completing 217 degrees of turn, before beginning a descending left turn. The airplane impacted terrain on airport property and was destroyed, killing the only occupant, the pilot.
- On December 17, 2004, a Cessna 421, N421FR, drifted to the right on takeoff from runway 17L, crossing the median and runway 17R, then suddenly rolled very steeply to the right, struck the ground with the right wing low, and cartwheeled. The aircraft was destroyed and the three occupants—a student pilot, a flight instructor, and a second instructor riding as a passenger—were killed. Ground witnesses reported that the pilots made several unsuccessful attempts to start the engines, and discussed taking the aircraft to a shop for repairs, but ultimately got the engines running and initiated the flight. Investigators found fuel system anomalies indicative of a fuel line blockage, and attributed the accident to a loss of engine power due to fuel starvation, and to the flight instructor's failure to perform proper emergency procedures and abort the flight.
- On May 12, 2021, a Cirrus SR22 and Key Lime Air Flight 970, a Swearingen SA226-TC Metroliner operating a charter cargo flight, collided on approach to Centennial Airport. The Cirrus made a safe off-airport parachute-assisted landing, while the Key Lime pilot landed safely at Centennial despite the loss of a section of the cabin roof, damage to the empennage, and failure of one engine. There were no injuries.
- On June 16, 2021, a Lancair Evolution plane crashed south of Centennial while on final approach. The plane collided with several power lines and started a brush fire which was contained by fire crews. The two occupants and a dog were killed in the crash.
- On August 9, 2022, a Cessna 182 Skylane crashed off the departure end of Runway 10. The sole pilot on board was killed. The final determination of the cause of the crash is pending; tentative reports indicate the aircraft was flown without the owner's knowledge and that the pilot had yet to complete a checkout flight on the type before being certified. According to a witness, the aircraft climbed to 150-200 feet AGL, sputtered, nosed down and impacted. There was no fire. The aircraft had no mechanical issues but had almost no fuel in the tanks.

== See also ==
- List of airports in the Denver area
- List of airports in Colorado
