= SolarStratos =

Aeronautical project

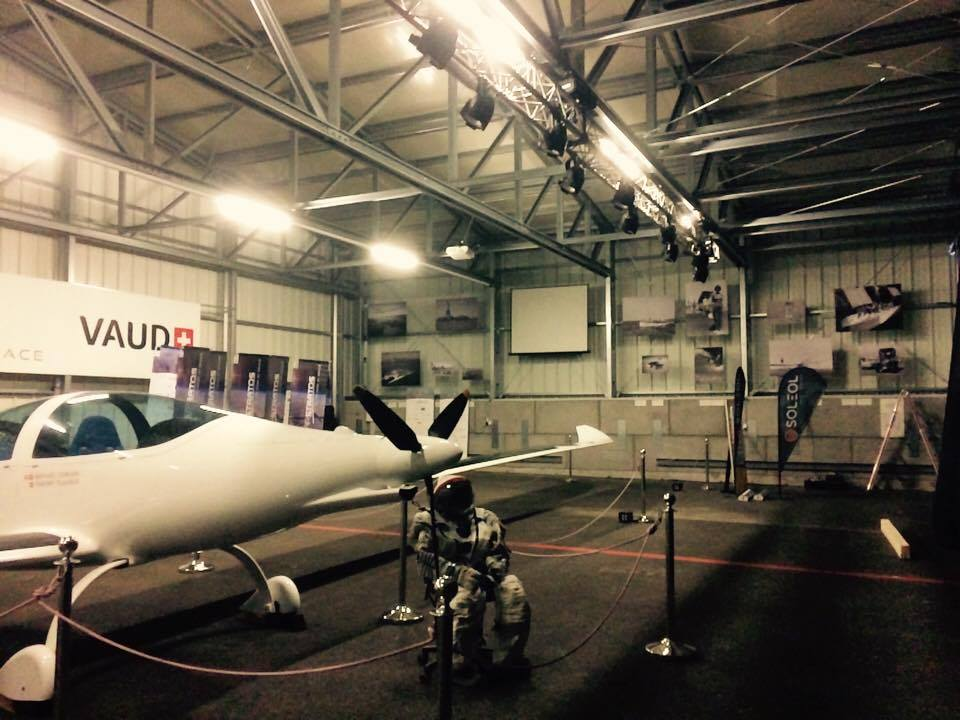
- SolarStratos at its base in Payerne in 2016.

General information
- Type: Experimental solar-powered aircraft
- National origin: Switzerland
- Manufacturer: SolarStratos
- Designer: Calin Gologan

History
- First flight: 5 May 2017

SolarStratos SA
- Industry: Air transport
- Founded: 2014
- Founder: Raphaël Domjan
- Headquarters: Yverdon-les-Bains, Switzerland
- Key people: Raphaël Domjan
- Products: Aviation, Renewable energy
- Website: SolarStratos

SolarStratos is an aeronautical project aimed at flying a piloted solar-powered airplane for the first time to the stratosphere. The SolarStratos airplane is equipped with solar cells but is not able to fly directly on solar power, thus is accurately described as a battery powered electric airplane that is equipped with solar cells; it is planned to be the first crewed solar-equipped aircraft to enter the stratosphere.

== Objectives ==
SolarStratos is a project officially initiated in March 2014 by Raphaël Domjan. It is a two-seater solar plane built by Calin Gologan with which he and his team plan to achieve an altitude record. The SolarStratos mission should allow Raphaël Domjan to reach more than 25,000 metres (82,000 ft), to altitudes hardly ever achieved with conventional propulsion aircraft.

This eco-exploration aims to demonstrate that renewable energies make it possible to go beyond what is possible with conventional modes of propulsion. Ultimately, and after the record flight planned for 2018, Raphaël Domjan and the SolarStratos team wish to commercialize the technologies developed during the stratospheric mission, in particular by developing stratospheric solar drones.

== Specifications (SolarStratos) ==
Data from

General characteristics

- Crew: 2
- Length: 8.5 m (27 ft 11 in)
- Wingspan: 24.8 m (81 ft 4 in)
- Gross weight: 450 kg (992 lb)
- Powerplant: 1 × unspecified electric motor, 32 kW (43 hp) at 2200 rpm, with 90% efficiency
- Solar cells: 22 m^{2} (240 sq ft)
- Cells efficiency: 22-24%
- Battery: Lithium-ion -20 kWh (72 MJ)
- Propellers: 3-bladed variable-pitch propeller, 2.2 m (7 ft 3 in) diameter

Performance

- Endurance: unreported

== Project stages ==
- 2012-2013: Constitution of the team and first feasibility study
- 17 March 2014 : Official launch of the SolarStratos project
- 2014-2015: Finalization of the design and start of construction of the aircraft
- 7 December 2016 : Presentation of the SolarStratos aircraft
- 2017: First flight on 5 May 2017, at Payerne, test flights and preparation for the record flight
- From 2018: Test flights
- On 6 July 2018, the aircraft's left wing broke during a stress test carried out on ground.
- From 2020: Record flight and first
- In August 2025, the aircraft set an altitude record for this class of aircraft by flying at 9521 meters (31237 feet).

== Funding ==
SolarStratos budget is around 10 million Swiss francs (10 million euros).

== Team ==
=== Operational team ===
About fifteen people work on the SolarStratos project. The CEO of SolarStratos is Swiss entrepreneur Roland Loos. Its president is the eco-explorer Raphaël Domjan, also the main pilot and intended to perform the record altitude flight. The mission's flight director is the Spanish American astronaut Michael López-Alegría. Gerald Ducoin takes on the role of test pilot of the prototype. Alexis Domjan, brother of Raphaël Domjan, is responsible for all telecommunication and IT aspects of the project.

=== Sponsors ===
Sponsors include Jean Verne, great-grandson of Jules Verne, Edgar Mitchell, Moon walker who flew on Apollo 14 (1930-2016), Marie-Vincente Latécoère, founding president of the PG Foundation Latécoère, Jacques Rougerie, oceanographer architect, Jean-François Clervoy, ESA astronaut, André Schneider, Vice-President of Resources and Infrastructures of the EPFL, Mirosław Hermaszewski, Polish astronaut, Manfred Dutch von Ehrenfried, author of Stratonauts: Pioneers Venturing into the Stratosphere, and Chuck Leavell, keyboardist of Rolling Stones and co-founder of the Mother Nature Network.

== See also ==
- Solar Impulse
- Sunseeker Duo
- Solar Challenger
- Solair
- Electric aircraft
