= Eric Raymond (disambiguation) =

Eric S. Raymond (born 1957) is an American computer programmer and author.

Eric Raymond may also refer to:

- Eric Scott Raymond (born 1956), American flight instructor and glider pilot
- Eric Raymond (Jem), a fictional character in the 1980s cartoon television show Jem
