= Domjan =

Domjan is a surname. Notable people with the surname include:

- Raphaël Domjan (born 1972), Swiss explorer and lecturer
- Veronika Domjan (born 1996), Slovenian discus thrower
- Edit Domján (1932–1972), Hungarian actress
