= Kiko Matthews =

British adventurer (born 1981)

Kiko Matthews (born in 1981) is a British adventurer. On 22 March 2018, she became the fastest female to row the Atlantic, solo and unsupported. Matthews rowed the 3284 miles from La Gomera to Port St. Charles, Barbados in 49 days 7 hours and 15 minutes. She took over a week off the previous record held since 2002 by Anne Quemere.

Through sponsorship of her world record attempt, Matthews had already raised over £105,000 for King's College Hospital by 15 December 2018.

Matthews grew up in Herefordshire. In 2009, she had a nearly fatal pituitary tumor, which resulted in Cushing's disease. She was treated at King's College Hospital, and had to undergo neurosurgery. In August 2017, she had another tumor, which occurred while she was training for the Atlantic crossing. Matthews started out as a science teacher and chose to take a different life path after her first experience of Cushing's Disease. She is passionate about the environment and community and the following year in 2019 she went on to cycle 6900 km around the entire coast of the UK engaging communities in 78 beach cleans and removing 3500 kg of ocean waste.
