= MacCready Solar Challenger =

Solar-powered aircraft

Solar Challenger
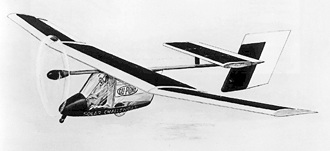
- A drawing of the Solar Challenger

General information
- Type: Experimental aircraft
- National origin: United States
- Manufacturer: AeroVironment
- Designer: Paul MacCready
- Status: Museum piece
- Number built: 1

History
- First flight: 6 November 1980
- Developed from: Gossamer Penguin

The Solar Challenger was a solar-powered aircraft designed by Paul MacCready's AeroVironment. The aircraft was designed as an improvement on the Gossamer Penguin, which in turn was a solar-powered variant of the human-powered Gossamer Albatross. It was powered entirely by the photovoltaic cells on its wing and stabilizer, without even reserve batteries, and was the first such craft capable of long-distance flight. In 1981, it successfully completed a 163-mile (262 km) demonstration flight from France to England.

== History ==
The Solar Challenger was designed by a team led by Paul MacCready as a more airworthy improvement on the Gossamer Penguin, directly incorporating lessons learned from flight testing the earlier aircraft. As with the Gossamer Penguin, construction was sponsored by DuPont in exchange for publicity for the company's patented materials incorporated in the design. AstroFlight, Inc. supplied the motors and solar panels, designed by Robert Boucher. The plane's wings carried 16,128 solar cells yielding a maximum solar power of 3,800 watts. It was flight tested in Western USA in winter 1980–1981.

On July 7, 1981, the aircraft flew 163 miles from Pontoise – Cormeilles Aerodrome, north of Paris, France to Manston Royal Air Force Base in Manston, United Kingdom, staying aloft 5 hours and 23 minutes, with pilot Stephen Ptacek at the controls. Currently the plane is owned by the Smithsonian Institution's Air and Space Museum.

== Design ==
The Solar Challenger was designed to be sturdier, more powerful, and more maneuverable than the Gossamer Penguin so as to be able to withstand sustained high-altitude flight and normal turbulence. It was over three times as heavy (without pilot) as the Gossamer Penguin and had a shorter wingspan, but was proportionately more powerful, with electricity supplied by 16,128 solar cells powering two three-horsepower motors. The solar panels were directly affixed to the wing and large horizontal stabilizer, both of which had to be flat on top to accommodate them. The two motors, each 3 inches wide and 17 inches long and incorporating samarium-cobalt permanent magnets, operated in tandem on a common shaft to drive a single, controllable-pitch propeller. The design incorporated advanced synthetic materials with very high strength to weight ratios, including Kevlar, Nomex, Delrin, Teflon, and Mylar, all supplied by the aircraft's sponsor, Dupont.

== Specifications ==
Data from

General characteristics

- Crew: One
- Capacity: One
- Length: 29 ft 0 in (8.8 m)
- Wingspan: 47 ft 0 in (14.3 m)
- Empty weight: 205 lb (90 kg)
- Gross weight: 350 lb (159 kg)
- Powerplant: 1 × solar-powered electric motor , 2.75 hp (2 kW)

Performance

- Maximum speed: 40 mph (64 km/h, 35 kn)
- Range: 400 mi (645 km, 350 nmi) (projected)
- Endurance: 11 hours (projected)
- Service ceiling: 14,300 ft (4,360 m) demonstrated, 35,000 ft (11,000 m) calculated at summer solstice
- g limits: +6, -3
- Rate of climb: 150 ft/min (0.765 m/s)

== See also ==
Related development

- Sunrise II, whose solar cells were used on this project
- Gossamer Penguin

Aircraft of comparable role, configuration, and era

- Solair
- Solar Impulse
- Solar-Powered Aircraft Developments Solar One
- Sunseeker I
