= Aerial robotics =

Aerial robotics or aerial robot may also refer to:

- Aerobot, an aerial robot for space exploration
- Unmanned aerial vehicle, an aerial robot for transportation
- Jetliner, an aerial robot with human pilot

== See also ==
- Robotics
