= Titan Winged Aerobot =

Aerobot exploration vehicle

Titan Winged Aerobot (TWA) is a new aerobot exploration vehicle (under creation) to enter the surface of Saturn's largest moon Titan. NASA has given this contract to Global Aerospace Corporation and Northrop Grumman collectively on July 6, 2016. Under the contract of 2016 NASA Small Business Innovation Research, both the teams will develop the TWA concept and produce a proof of concept prototype for Earth-based testing.

Titan Winged Aerobot features will be its ultra-low power requirement and extended vertical range, both of which is inspired by Northrop Grumman's Titan lifting entry atmosphere flight (T-Leaf) platform. Titan's atmosphere is denser than Earth's atmosphere, with the atmospheric pressure of 1.45 atm. Its atmosphere contains 98.4% nitrogen with remaining 1.6% is composed of 1.4% methane and 0.1-0.2% hydrogen. Titan's cold and harsh environment can cause problems to any lighter-than-air exploration. TWA will be designed in the way that it can overcome those challenges.

== Design ==
TWA is the vehicle with 3-D directional control so that it can complete its objectives of researching Titan's environment, while using minimal power from a single radioisotope power source. Constantly moving in an atmosphere will facilitate long lived flight at low altitudes and target delivery to the surface.

Titan is the only moon with an atmosphere, and its atmosphere is the only known nitrogen-rich atmosphere in the Solar System. The observations from Voyager 1 and Cassini–Huygens shows that its atmosphere is denser than Earth's with the atmospheric pressure of 1.45 atm. It is 1.9 times as massive as Earth overall.
