= Raphaël Domjan =

Swiss explorer and lecturer (born 1972)

- Raphaël Domjan at the Forum 100 in 2012
- Born: Raphaël Domjan; 19 January 1972 (age 54); Neuchâtel, Switzerland
- Citizenship: Swiss
- Occupations: EcoExplorer and speaker
- Honours: Solar Swiss Prize 2012 Europeen Solar Prize 2013 Knight of the Order of Saint-Charles 2022 Holder Guinness World Record
- Website: https://www.raphaeldomjan.com/

Raphaël Domjan (born 19 January 1972) is a Swiss explorer and lecturer. He started and completed the first round-the-world trip using solar energy between September 2010 and May 2012 aboard the MS catamaran PlanetSolar. In 2015, he carried out the first polar solar navigation in the Arctic Ocean. He is the founder and pilot of the SolarStratos project, the first solar plane in the stratosphere. In August 2020, he made the first jump off of an electric plane and the first solar free fall. Raphaël Domjan is a pilot, mountaineer, diver and parachutist.

He is a member of the Explorer Club of New York as well as the Société des Explorateurs Français.

He was made a Knight of the Order of Saint-Charles by HSH Prince Albert II of Monaco on 17 November 2022.

== Biography ==
Raphaël Domjan was born on 19 January 1972 in Neuchâtel, Switzerland and raised in Lausanne. In 2001, he co-founded the company Horus Networks Sàrl, the world's first solar web server.

In 2004, Domjan launched his first solar-powered round-the-world project. He founded PlanetSolar SA then, in 2007, the PlanetSolar Foundation. The PlanetSolar catamaran was built in Germany between 2008 and 2010, financed by the German entrepreneur Immo Stroeher.

In 2007, he travelled between Martinique and Dominica in the expedition of the Sun 21, the first solar boat to cross the Atlantic using solar energy. On this occasion he probably made the first dive from a solar boat in history. He also participated in the crossing of the United States north/south with Louis Palmer aboard the SolarTaxi, a solar and electric car.

Between 2010 and 2012, he made the first solar-powered round-the-world trip aboard PlanetSolar as the leader of the expedition.

In 2014, he brought together an international team and launched the SolarStratos mission, the objective of which was to reach the stratosphere with a piloted solar plane.

In 2015, along with the sailor Anne Quemere, he attempted to make the first crossing of the Northwest Passage in a solar powered kayak. Unfortunately, the weather conditions were unfavorable and they had to turn back after 300 km. The expedition nevertheless constitutes the first solar polar navigation in history.

On 25 August 2020, he jumped out of the SolarStratos HB-SXA solar plane in Payerne, Switzerland, with test pilot Miguel Iturmendi in command of the plane, the first jump off of an electric plane and the first free fall in solar history. He dropped several hundred meters and reached a speed of 150kmh.

In 2021, he became the first pilot of an electric plane flight with a head of state. On 14 September 2021 they took off with a Pipistrel Velis128 operated by Elektropostal from Nice airport in France with H.S.H. Albert II, Prince of Monaco and they flew over the Principality of Monaco. The plane flew for 30 minutes at a maximum altitude of 900 feet.

On 18 June 2022 Raphaël Domjan took off with HB-SXA solar plane from Sion airport in Switzerland with the adventurer Géraldine Fasnacht on board. She jumped from SolarStratos at more than 9,000 feet above the Swiss Alps and achieved the first wingsuit flight from an electric and solar plane. She landed in the village of Verbier in Switzerland at more than 1,000 meters above sea level.

On 12 August 2025, he set a historic record by becoming the highest-flying pilot in the world in an electric and solar-powered aircraft, reaching 9,640 metres or 31'627 feets at the controls of the solar aircraft SolarStratos HB-SXA.

In 2025, he brought a second-hand solar-powered boat, the MS PlanetSolar II, to Lake Titicaca, situated at an altitude of 3,810 metres and considered the highest navigable lake in the world. Between 30 September and 15 October 2025, he completed the first solar-powered crossing of Lake Titicaca, as well as the first circumnavigation of the lake by solar-powered boat. The vessel will subsequently be made available to scientists and archaeologists to support their research while helping to protect the lake from human pollution and the effects of climate change

== PlanetSolar ==
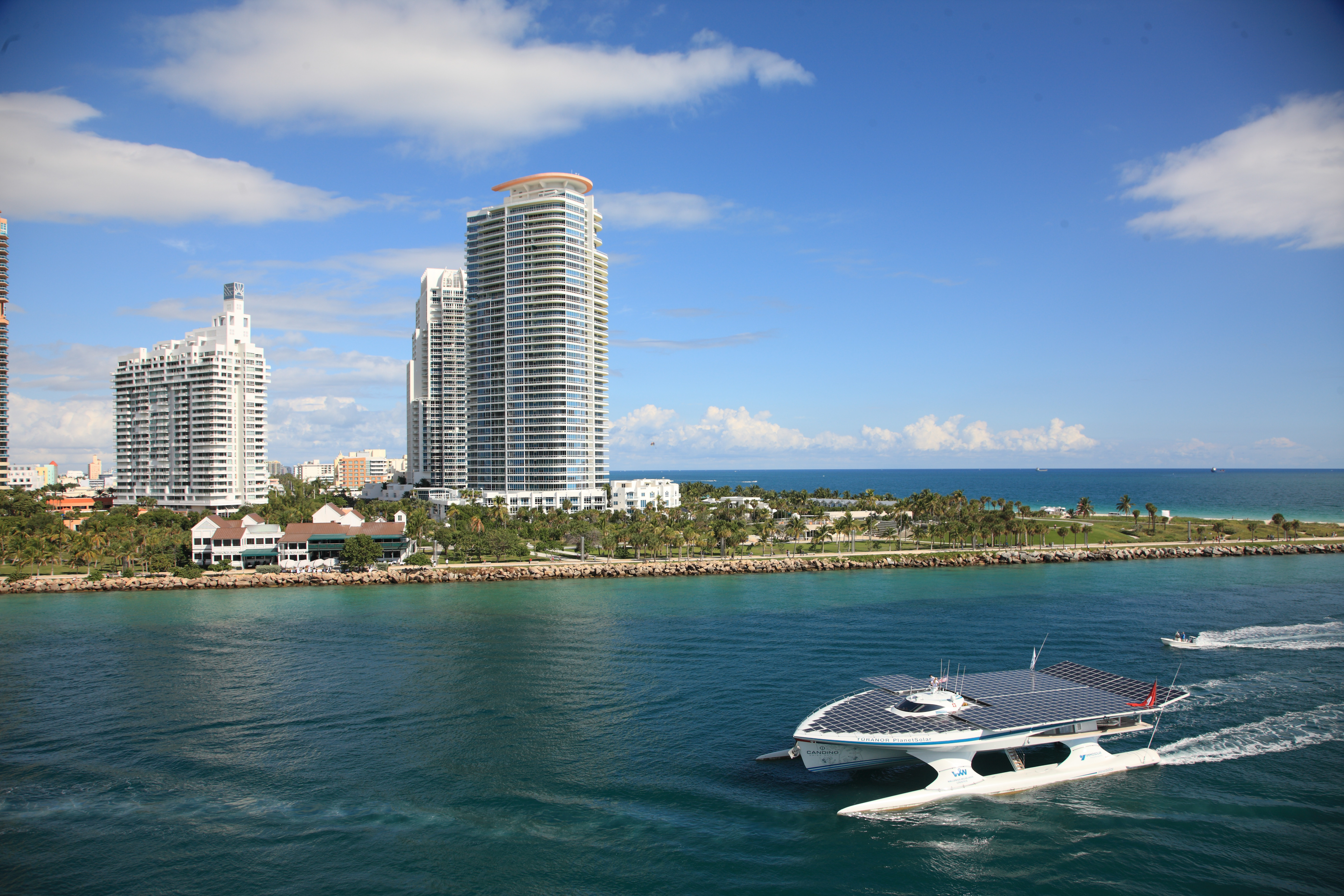
PlanetSolar in Miami

=== First world tour using solar energy ===
The MS Tûranor PlanetSolar is the largest solar boat built to date and the first to have sailed around the world powered by solar energy. Having left Monaco on 27 September 2010, the PlanetSolar and her crew followed a route close to the Equator. After passing through the Atlantic Ocean, Panama Canal, Pacific Ocean, Indian Ocean, Suez Canal and Mediterranean, the boat reached Monaco on 4 May 2012. after 585 days and 60,006 km traveled.

=== PlanetSolar crew members during the first solar world tour (2010-2012) ===
Raphaël Domjan was the expedition leader of PlanetSolar during his round the world trip between 2010 and 2012. Patrick Marchesseau was the captain of PlanetSolar from Monaco to Nouméa, and Erwann le Rouzic took over from Nouméa until the return to the starting point, Monaco. They were accompanied by Jens Langwasser, a boatman, and Christian Oschenbein, an electrical engineer.

=== Firsts and records ===
During its round-the-world trip, PlanetSolar achieved a number of firsts: the first solar-powered round-the-world trip, first trip around the world by solar boat, and first crossing of the Indian Ocean and Red Sea with solar energy. In terms of records, PlanetSolar is also the largest solar boat in the world, and is the solar vehicle that traveled the longest distance (60,023 km).

=== Stamps ===
After the first round the world trip by solar boat, La Poste Monaco issued a postage stamp on the adventure PlanetSolar with a value of 77 centimes Euros representing PlanetSolar in Monaco.

== SolarStratos ==
The project aims to demonstrate the potential of solar energy and electricity to go beyond what is possible with conventional propulsion methods. The SolarStratos aircraft was unveiled to the public and the media on December 7, 2016, and completed its maiden flight on May 5, 2017, in Payerne, Switzerland.

On 25 August 2020, SolarStratos was used for the first jump from an electric aircraft, which also marked the first solar-powered free fall in history.

On 12 August 2025, departing from Sion, Switzerland, the solar aircraft HB-SXA reached an altitude of 31,627 feet 9,640 metres, setting the absolute altitude record for a crewed electric and solar-powered aircraft.

Following the planned stratospheric flight, the SolarStratos team has stated its intention to contribute to the energy transition, particularly by supporting the electrification of future aviation.

== Honours and Awards ==
- Swiss Solar Prize 2012
- European Solar Prize 2013
- Knight of the Order of Saint-Charles (Monaco), awarded on 17 November 2022
- FAI Louis Blériot Medal, awarded in 2026

== Publications ==
- Jaunin Roger, Domjan Raphaël (2010) - « PlanetSolar », Lausanne: Favre, 144 pp.
- Jaunin Roger, Domjan Raphaël (2012) - « PlanetSolar, Premier tour du monde à l’énergie solaire », Lausanne : Favre, 170 pp.
- Javet Raphaëlle, Domjan Raphaël (2018) - « Pionniers et aventuriers de l'énergie solaire », Lausanne : Favre, 136 pp.

== Filmography ==
- À la poursuite du soleil (2012) - documentary (52 minutes) directed by Olivier Vittel, produced by the PlanetSolar Foundation.
- SolarStratos « la naissance d’un rêve » (2021) – documentary (52 minutes) directed by Stéphane Chopard and Eric Beaufils and produced by Gédéon
- SolarStratos « a la poursuite du rêve » (2025) – documentary (52 minutes) directed by Stéphane Chopard and Eric Beaufils and produced by Gédéon
