= IFB-Stuttgart E-Genius =

German electric airplane

e-Genius
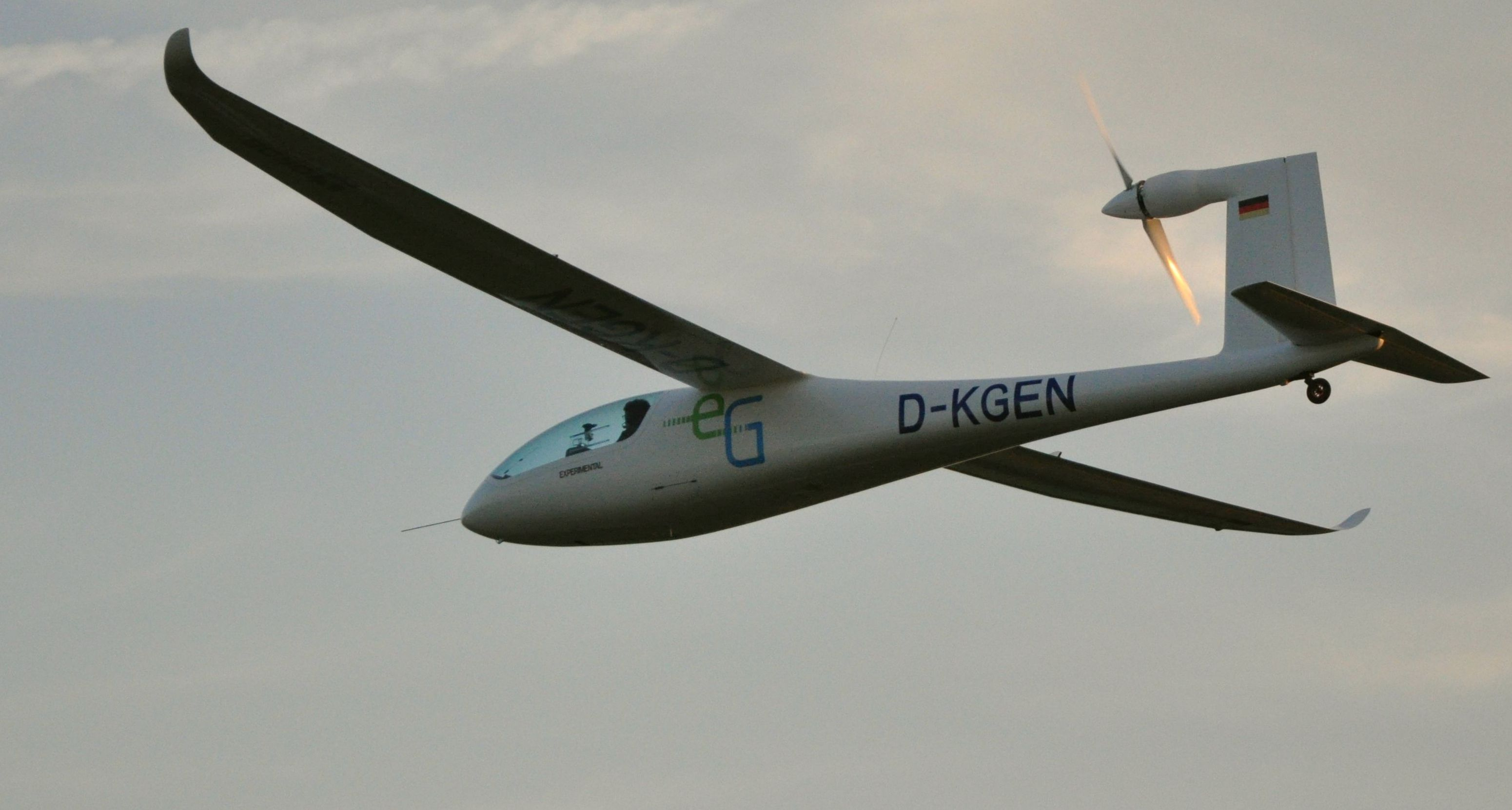
- e-Genius in flight

General information
- Type: Electric powered motor-glider
- National origin: Germany
- Manufacturer: IFB-Stuttgart (Universität Stuttgart – Institut für Flugzeugbau)
- Number built: 1

History
- First flight: 25 May 2011
- Developed from: Icaré II

The e-Genius is a crewed electric airplane developed by the Institute of Aircraft Design at the University of Stuttgart, which first flew in May 2011.

== Development ==
The e-Genius follows a line of airplanes with alternative propulsion systems, which have been developed at the Institute of Aircraft Design under the leadership of Professor Rudolf Voit-Nitschmann: the solar-motor glider Icaré II (1996) and the predecessor of the e-Genius, the motor glider with a fuel cell propulsion system – Hydrogenius (2006). Both have been awarded with the Berblinger-Prize of the City of Ulm, Germany.

Most of the airplane was built by a team of students between October 2010 and May 2011 in the workshop of the Institute of Aircraft Design of the University of Stuttgart.

The power capabilities of a modern electric propulsion system based on batteries are to be demonstrated with the e-Genius. In addition, Eric Scott Raymond and his team participated in the Green Flight Challenge of the Comparative Aircraft Flight Efficiency (CAFE) in the summer of 2011 in Santa Rosa, California with this aircraft, finishing second and winning the Lindbergh Prize for the quietest aircraft. The Green Flight Challenge is part of the Centennial Challenges, competition prize contests for non-government-funded technological achievements. The Green Flight Challenge has been endowed by NASA with prize money of $1,650,000. The goal of the competition was to find an aircraft which can fly a minimum range of about 200 miles at a minimum speed of 100 mph while using less than 200mpg and seat two persons.

On 25 May 2011, e-Genius successfully completed the first flight on the airfield in Mindelheim-Mattsies, Germany. On 15 June e-Genius made a flight over 340 km (211 miles) and an average speed of more than 160 km/h (100 mph), which was claimed to be the longest distance ever flown with an electric aircraft by that time.

Nearly 2 years after these flights, another world record was claimed with a flight over 400 km (249 miles) during a measurement campaign in the context of the 2013 Idaflieg summer meeting. Apart from some maintenance work and some alterations to some subsystems, the e-Genius had remained technically unchanged since the Green Flight Challenge in 2011. In September 2013, e-Genius won the Green Speed Cup with pilot Klaus Ohlmann. On the way from its home base to the Green Speed Cup the e-Genius covered a distance of 560 km (348 mi) in two legs.

As of 2015, the developers are testing a range extender to 2.5 hours or about 400 km (250 mi).

== Design ==
The e-Genius is a two seated high wing configuration aircraft completely manufactured of fibre composites and equipped with a retractable landing gear. The seat configuration is side-by-side.

The propulsion is realized by a permanent magnet synchronous motor with an electrical driven variable-pitch propeller. The diameter of this tractor configured propeller is 2.20 m (7.3 ft).

The electric motor was designed and manufactured especially for the e-Genius by the Slovenian company Sineton. The motor has a maximum continuous power of about 58 kW and a peak performance up to 100 kW at a weight of just 27 kg (59 lb). The electric motor is integrated in the vertical tail of the e-Genius. Directly behind the pilots in the centre of gravity the four lithium-ion battery packs are integrated into the fuselage. The total capacity of this battery system is about 56 kWh.

== Specifications ==
Data from

General characteristics

- Crew: 2
- Capacity: 180 kg (397 lbs)
- Length: 8.1 m (26 ft 7 in)
- Wingspan: 16.9 m (55 ft 5 in)
- Wing area: 14.56 m^{2} (156.7 sq ft)
- Gross weight: 850 kg (1,874 lb)
- Max takeoff weight: 950 kg (2,094 lb)
- Powerplant: 1 × Sineton electric motor, 60 kW (80 hp) at 2,000 rpm, max 100 kW (130 hp)
- Propellers: 2-bladed variable pitch, 2.2 m (7 ft 3 in) diameter

Performance

- Maximum speed: 270 km/h (170 mph, 150 kn)
- Cruise speed: 161 km/h (100 mph, 87 kn)
- Stall speed: 77 km/h (48 mph, 42 kn) with flaps
- Range: 400 km (250 mi, 220 nmi) +
- Service ceiling: 6,000 m (20,000 ft)
- Rate of climb: 4.5 m/s (890 ft/min)
- Take-off distance on grass: – 285 m (935 ft)
- Take-off distance over 15 m (49.2 ft) obstacle: – 450 m (1,476.4 ft)

== See also ==
Aircraft of comparable role, configuration, and era

- Pipistrel Taurus G4

== Sources ==
- Homepage of the e-Genius project at the Institute of Aircraft Design Stuttgart
