= Eric Scott Raymond =

American aircraft designer and pilot (born 1956)

Eric Raymond (born October 27, 1956, in Tacoma, Washington) is an American Certified Flight Instructor, Glider (sailplane) pilot, hang gliding pilot and designer of solar-powered airplanes.

== Biography ==
Raymond was born in the US state of Washington. After completing his public education, he studied photography at Rochester Institute of Technology and aerospace engineering at University of California San Diego, California. He is now living in Europe, more specifically Slovenia. .

== Aeronautic career ==
Raymond starting flying model airplanes as a child, designing and building his own model airplanes. In his teenage years he started flying sailplanes, but switched to hang gliding. He won the 1979 US Hang Gliding Championship. He also set world hang gliding records and in 1983 and 1984 became world aerobatic champion.

Working for Paul MacCready on unmanned aircraft, he met Günther Rochelt, and had occasion to pilot Rochelt's Musculair II human-powered aircraft. From this experience, and with help from Rochelt, Raymond determined to design a solar-powered aircraft. He founded Solar Flight and began construction of his design in 1986. Sunseeker I was test flown in 1989 as a glider. In early 1990 solar-powered flights were made with two brush motors driving a variable-pitch propeller and then with a brushless motor driving a folding propeller. In 1990 Raymond flew Sunseeker I across the US, and in 2009 he flew Sunseeker II all over southern Europe. From 2006 to 2009 he worked for Bertrand Piccard, building the solar panels for the Solar Impulse airplane. In 2009 Solar Flight began construction of a new solar-powered airplane, the Sunseeker Duo. Raymond has received considerable press coverage for his efforts advancing both solar-powered and electric aircraft, notably in 2011 as a team leader of the e-Genius team in the CAFE Foundation Green Flight Challenge.

On March 30, 2014, two Solar Flight test pilots flew the Sunseeker Duo from Milan, thus becoming the first solely-solar-powered aircraft to fly while carrying two people. The Duo has 1,510 solar cells on its 72-ft span wing and on its empennage surfaces, driving a tail-mounted 25KW electric motor.
