= AstroFlight =

Astroflight, Incorporated is a manufacturer of products for electric-powered radio controlled aircraft, unmanned aerial vehicles (UAV), brushless industrial motors, the world's first solar-powered aircraft and the world's first practical electric radio controlled model airplane. The company is based in Irvine, California, US.

== Early history ==
The company was founded in 1969 by Bob Boucher and Roland Boucher. Their goal was the development and production of a high-performance radio controlled sailplane for use in AMA-certified competition. That first sailplane, the "Malibu," finished third in its very first outing in San Jose that same year. Bob Boucher would use a Malibu in 1970 to set a closed-course world record for soaring. His record flight of 302 km took place at Waimanalo Beach, Hawaii. The introduction of the Fournier RF-4 electric R/C airplane in 1971 marked the debut of the world's first practical electric-powered model airplane. This would be the model which Roland Boucher would use to set a world record for duration and distance with a flight of one hour and a distance of 29 miles (47 km) on a single charge. Since no official categories for electric flight existed at the time, neither the AMA nor the FAI recognized the record.

The Northrop Corporation awarded Astro Flight a contract in 1972 to develop a low- altitude electric surveillance drone. Project manager Bob Boucher along with Roland Boucher and their lone employee Dave Shadel finished the design in only six months. The result was the Model 7212 flying wing. With a wingspan of 8', the 7212 was powered by three of the company's Astro 40 ferrite motors each turning a three-blade, 8x8 propeller. The 7212 would set another unofficial record in August 1973 by carrying a 7.5 pound lead payload over a closed course for an hour and twenty minutes at speeds reaching 75 mph (121 km/h).

== The world's first solar-powered airplane ==
Astro Flight was awarded a DARPA contract through Lockheed in 1974 in order to build the Sunrise, the world's first solar-powered airplane. The historic flight, powered only by sunlight, took place November 4, 1974, at Fort Irwin, California. Two Astro Flight Astro 40 ferrite motors powered the craft via a 6:1 gearbox swinging a 36x24 wood propeller. More than one thousand solar cells on the wing were the sole source of energy, producing roughly 450 watts of power. The craft, weighing in at 27 pounds with its 32' wingspan, had a service ceiling of 20,000 feet (6,100 m) depending on available sunlight. 1975 saw both the departure of Roland Boucher and damage to Sunrise I in a windstorm. It also saw the introduction of the improved Sunrise II, built in just three months. Its maiden flight was on September 27, 1975, at Nellis AFB. Improvements included a single Astro Flight Cobalt 40 motor powered by 4480 solar cells with an output of 600 watts. Climb rate was drastically improved at over 300 feet (91 m) per minute as was the estimated service ceiling of 75,000 feet (23,000 m), although actual flights did not exceed 20,000 feet (6,100 m) due to problems with both command and control.

== The world's first human-carrying solar-powered airplane ==
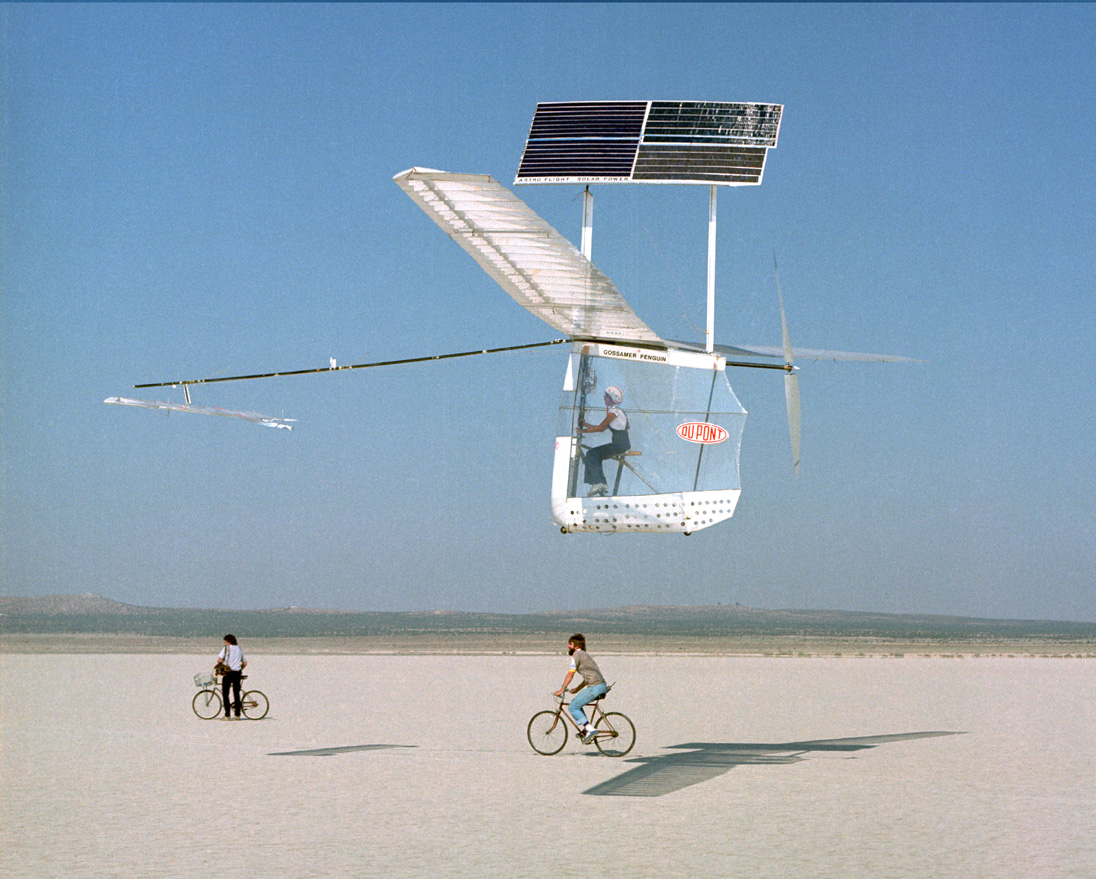
Gossamer Penguin

In 1979, DuPont sponsored Dr. Paul MacCready in his attempt to create a solar powered plane capable of carrying a human. The result was the Gossamer Penguin which had its first flight on May 16, 1980, in Shafter, California. It utilized the 600 watt solar panel used to power Sunrise II along with a production version Cobalt 40 motor. Thrust was via a three-stage transmission turning an 11' propeller at 120 rpm. Motor speed was 15,000 rpm. The success of Gossamer Penguin prompted DuPont to agree to sponsor a solar plane capable of crossing the English Channel. The Dupont Solar Challenger required three months to build the solar panels with their 16,128 cells. The setup was capable of 4000 watts at operating altitude and 2500 watts at sea level. A 3.5 horsepower (2.6 kW) motor, specially designed for the project, turned 9000 rpm through a 22:1 belt-drive reduction unit, resulting in a propeller speed of about 400 rpm.

On July 7, 1981, pilot Steve Ptacek piloted the Dupont Solar Challenger from Pontoise, France to the Manston RAF base in Kent, England.

Today, Astro Flight continues to provide hobbyists with motors, battery chargers and electronic speed controls. Their model 4005 AC/DC battery charger, introduced in 1982 at the Toledo R/C Show became an industry standard, with more than 500,000 units produced over the next decade. They serve industrial customers with custom-made brushless motors. Their Astro Model 300 ten-horsepower DC motor is the same one used in the GM Sunraycer experimental solar powered automobile.
