= MacCready Gossamer Penguin =

Solar-powered experimental aircraft

Gossamer Penguin
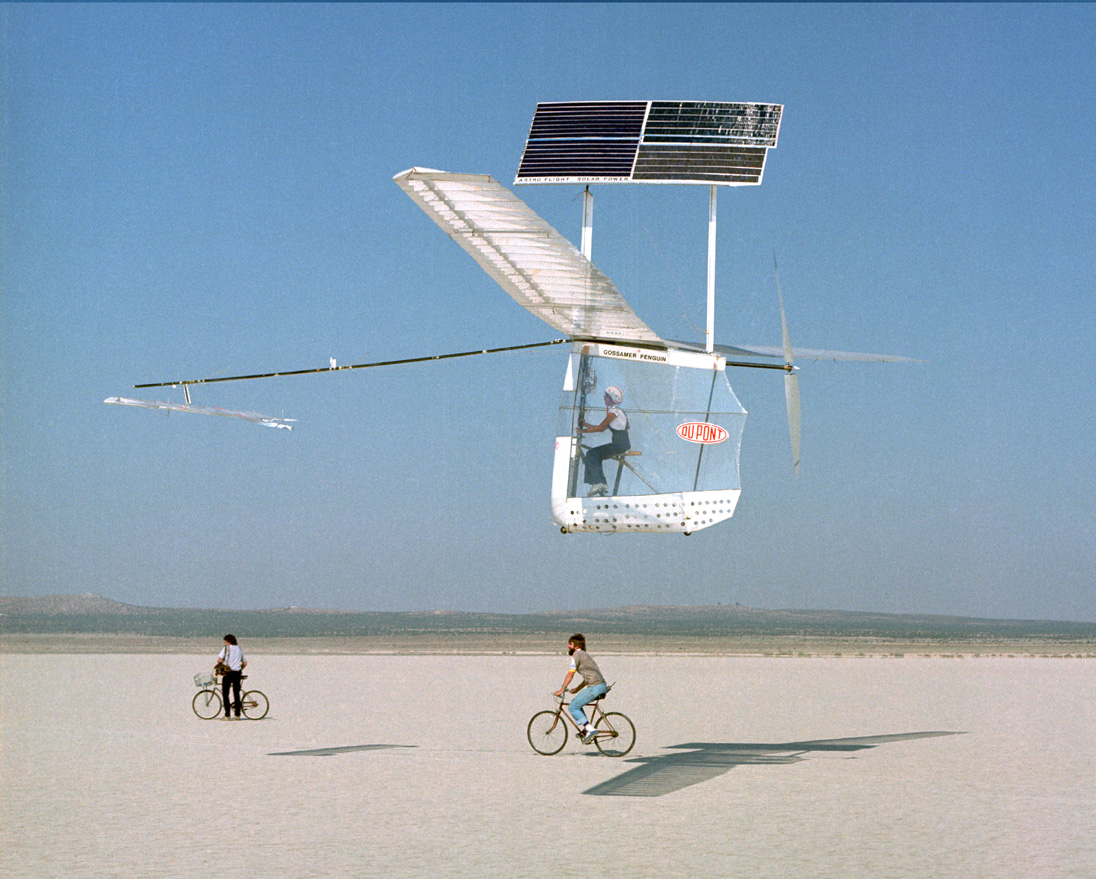
- Test flight of the Gossamer Penguin

General information
- Type: experimental aircraft
- National origin: United States
- Manufacturer: AeroVironment
- Designer: Paul MacCready
- Status: Sole example in possession of The Science Place Foundation
- Number built: 1

History
- First flight: May 18, 1979
- Developed from: Gossamer Albatross
- Developed into: Solar Challenger

The Gossamer Penguin was a solar-powered experimental aircraft created by Paul MacCready's AeroVironment. MacCready had built the Gossamer Condor in 1977 which won the Kremer prize for the first human-powered flight, and the Gossamer Albatross, a similar but larger aircraft. The Gossamer Penguin was developed from the Albatross and used that ultralight design to demonstrate solar flight at testing ground at Minter Field, outside of Shafter, California. The Gossamer Penguin was the third solar-powered aircraft to fly, and the second crewed solar-powered aircraft.

The Penguin was a three-quarter scale version of the Gossamer Albatross II; it had a 71-foot (22 m) wingspan and a weight, without pilot, of 68 pounds (31 kg). The propeller was driven by an AstroFlight Astro-40 electric motor, powered by a 541 watt solar panel, consisting of 3920 solar cells.

Initial test flights were performed using a 28–cell, NiCad battery pack instead of a solar panel. The test pilot for these flights was MacCready's 13-year-old son Marshall, who weighed 80 lb (36 kg).

The official pilot for the project was Janice Brown, a charter pilot with commercial, instrument, and glider ratings who weighed slightly less than 100 lb (45 kg). She flew the Penguin approximately 40 times before a 1.95-mile (3.14 km) public demonstration flight at NASA's Dryden Flight Research Center on August 7, 1980.

== Specifications ==
Data from MacCready, Lissaman, Morgan, and Burke 1983

General characteristics

- Crew: 1
- Wingspan: 71 ft 0 in (21.64 m)
- Wing area: 297 sq ft (27.6 m^{2})
- Empty weight: 68 lb (30.8 kg)
- Fuel capacity: 28 x D type Nickel Cadmium (NiCad) cells or 3920 solar cells
- Powerplant: 1 × Astro-Flight Astro-40 double brush DC electric motor with 133:1 reduction

== See also ==
- Solar-powered aircraft

Related development

- MacCready Gossamer Albatross
- MacCready Solar Challenger
