= Anne Quemere =

French sailor and sportswoman (born 1966)

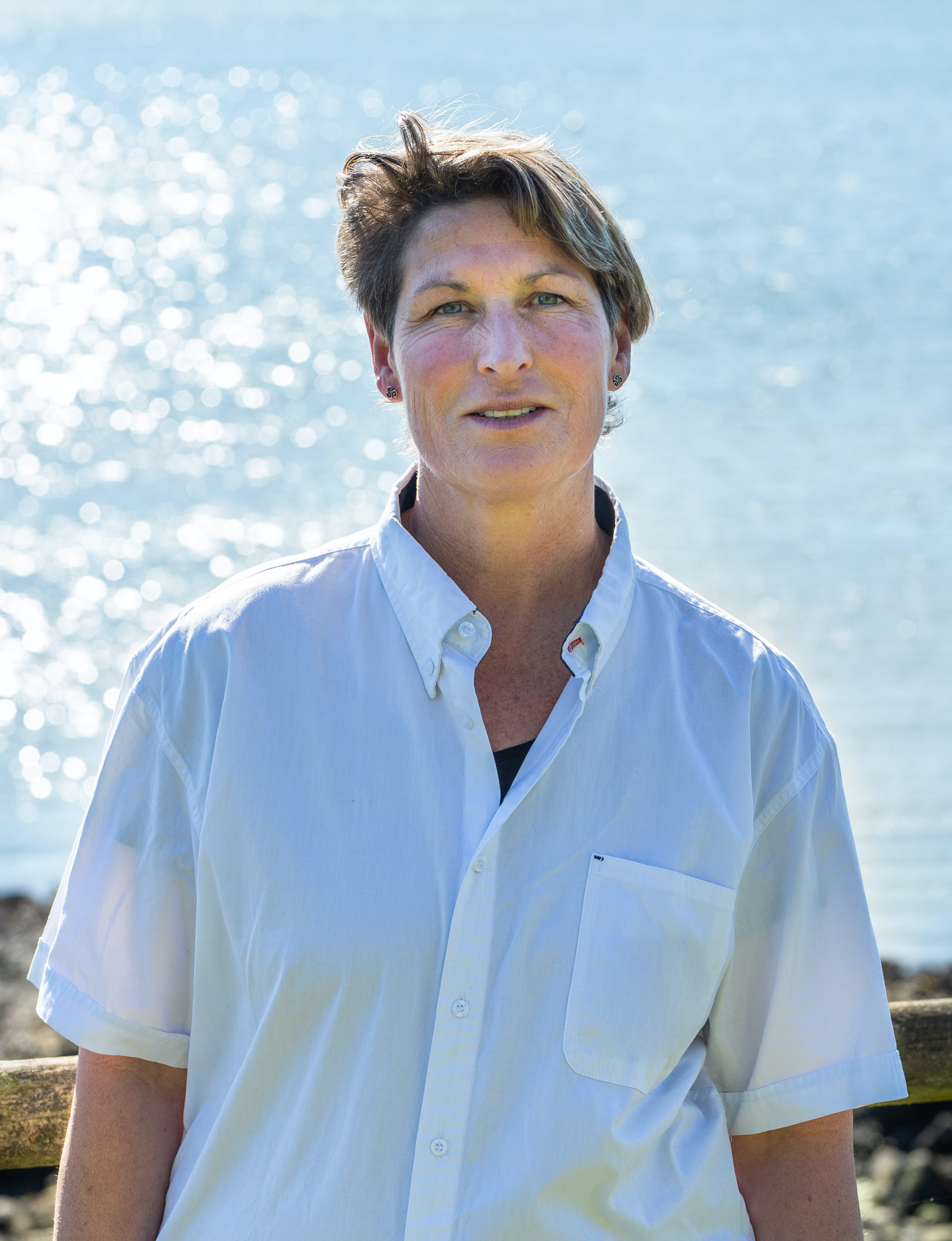
- Anne Quemere in 2021
- Born: Anne Quemere; May 19, 1966 (age 60); Quimper, Finistère, France
- Occupations: Sailor, sportswoman
- Years active: 1994–present

Anne Quemere (born May 19, 1966) is a French sailor and sportswoman.

== Biography ==
From an early age, she found herself close to the sea on which she sails, as a family living in the Glénan archipelago, on the islands of Groix, Belle-Île, Houat or Hœdic. Her father was a sailor. She was the third among three sisters and a brother.

After her high school diploma, she went to the University of Rennes and then in the 1990s she flew to the United States where she settled. Residing in New Orleans, Vermont and New York, she worked in tourism, day after day traveling the North American continent, Mexico, Asia, and India. In the early 2000s, she returned to Brittany and began new activities.

== Ocean crossings ==
=== 2002-2004: Atlantic and solo records ===
In 2002, after two years of meticulous preparation, she rowed across the Atlantic following the easterlies route. Starting from the island of Gomera in the Canary Islands, she arrived in Guadeloupe 56 days later, thus establishing the new female record held until then by the American Tori Murden.

In 2004, she set off from Cape Cod in the United States, rowing and solo, to reach the French coast, which she set foot on 86 days later, having covered some 6,450 km. This trip was for her, the opportunity to claim a new female record.

=== 2006: the North Atlantic by kite ===
In June 2006, she left New York aboard a small prototype 6 meters long towed by a kite, also called a traction wing or controllable kite. Alone and non-stop, she arrived on the island of Ushant (Brittany coast) at the end of her trip, 55 days later. This crossing was a world first.

=== 2008-2011: Pacific and mission in Greenland ===
In November 2008, she tried to cross the Pacific aboard her prototype, called a kiteboat, from San Francisco to Tahiti. This time things were not so easy. "I was stuck for 4 weeks at sea. Communications were cut. Later a cargo vessel rescued me." She was rescued safe and sound by a cargo ship that had left China and was headed for New York.

During the summer of 2010, she flew to southeastern Greenland and joined an expedition called "La Grande Dérive" in Tasiilaq, whose mission is scientific and the objective is raising public awareness of the fragility of the ice floe. In the company of Emmanuel Hussenet, Luc Dénoyer and Gauthier Mesnil-Blanc, they drifted on ice floes and traveled in a kayak for five weeks, completely alone. It was a mission to observe climate change.

In March 2011, she set off from the port of Callao, Peru for a solo crossing of the Pacific aboard her kiteboat Adrien whose only driving force was a traction wing. Despite some technical problems and a radio silence of two months (following a failure of her satellite phone) she completed her journey of approximately 7,000 km in 78 days. She landed on the island of Makemo, one of the largest atolls of the Tuamotu in French Polynesia in May 2011 before joining Papeete. This Pacific crossing was a world first.

=== 2014-2018: Northwest Passage ===
In June 2014, she returned to the Arctic and attempted to cross the Northwest Passage by kayak and solo, but the ice blocked her way and she was forced to give up her journey.

In 2015, along with Raphaël Domjan, she attempted to make the first crossing of the Northwest Passage in a solar powered kayak. Unfortunately, the weather conditions were unfavorable and they had to turn back after 300 km. The expedition nevertheless constitutes the first solar polar navigation in history.

A book recounting these two journeys came out on March 11, 2016 (Passagère de l'Arctique, ed. Locus Solus) ISBN 9782368331101.

During the summer of 2018, she tried the Northwest Passage again, aboard a solar boat, this time with better weather conditions. She had to give up before it could be completed, but drew from the experience a documentary of the same name as her previous book.

== Decorations ==
- Legion of Honour (2021)
- Ordre du Mérite Maritime (2012)
- Ordre of the Hermine (2022)
