= Sunseeker Duo =

Italian model of electric aircraft

General information
- Type: Electric Aircraft
- National origin: Italy
- Designer: Eric Scott Raymond
- Number built: 1

History
- First flight: 17 December 2013

The Sunseeker Duo is a twin seat all-electric solar-recharged powered aircraft. Designed by Eric Scott Raymond, the plane can take off and achieve enough height for the motor to be switched off and follow thermals like a glider (sailplane), allowing the batteries to be recharged through the solar cells on the wings. Still in testing phase, the company, Solar Flight, does not provide information on the range.

== Development ==
The Sunseeker Duo is a high aspect ratio side-by-side seat composite construction high-wing aircraft with a T-tail arrangement with a single electric motor mounted in the tailfin (vertical stabilizer) driving a forward mounted propeller. The first all-solar power generated flight was performed near Milan, Italy with company owners Eric Scott Raymond and Irena Raymond. 1510 solar cells capable of generating up to 5 kilowatts power the motor and battery pack.

== Specifications (Sunseeker Duo) ==
Data from Sport Aviation, Solar Flight Inc.

General characteristics

- Crew: 2
- Capacity: 2 passengers
- Wingspan: 22 m (72 ft)
- Empty weight: 290 kg (639.341 lb)
- Max takeoff weight: 470 kg (1,036 lb)

Performance

- Stall speed: 45 km/h (28 mph, 24 kn)
- Never exceed speed: 160 km/h (100 mph, 87 kn)
- Endurance: Varies with solar conditions – designed for 12 hrs
- Service ceiling: 3,700 m (12,000 ft)
- Maximum glide ratio: 1:38
