= Solar-powered aircraft =

Flying sun-powered vehicles

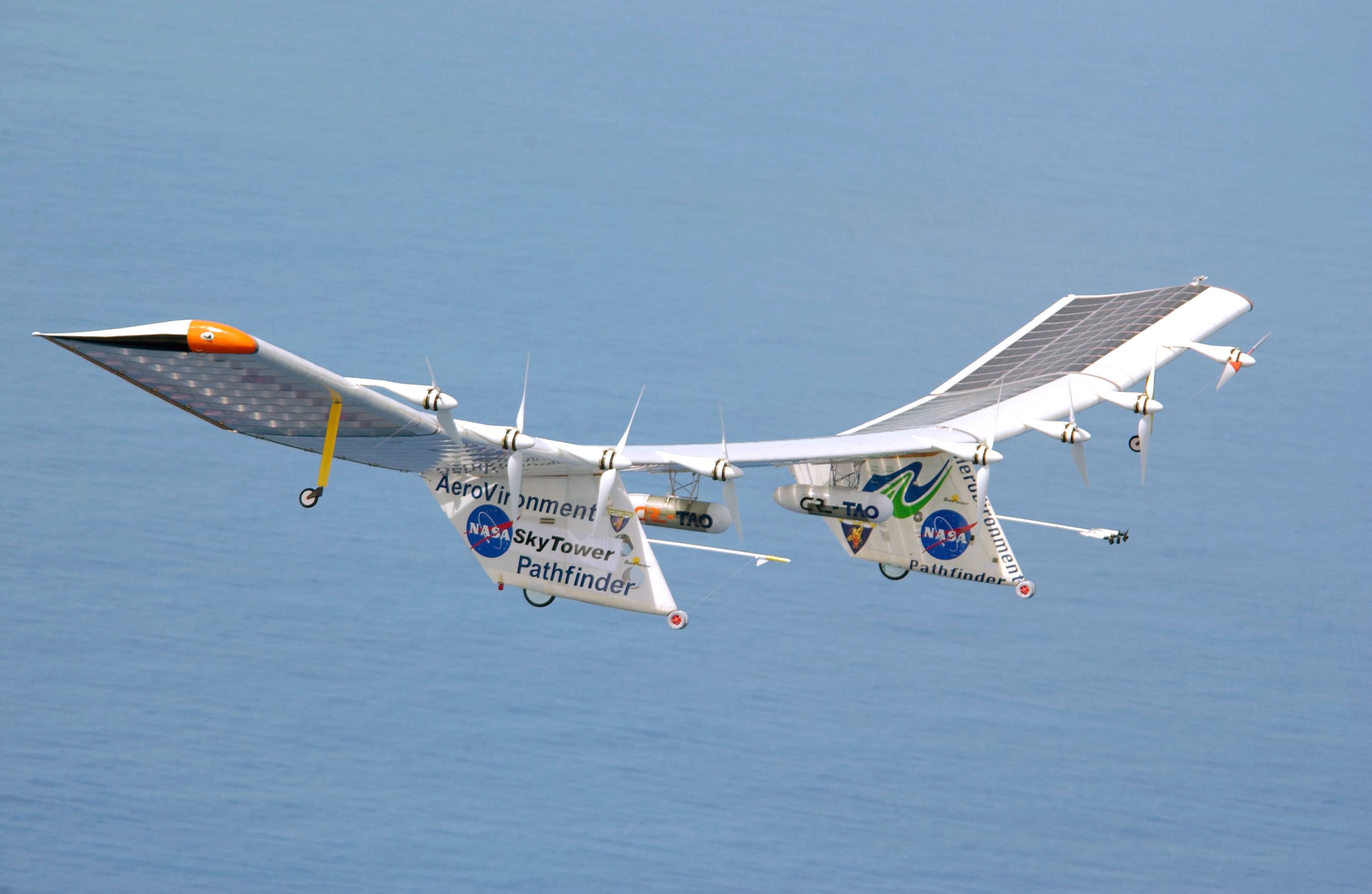
NASA's Pathfinder prototype

Solar-powered aircraft are electric aircraft that can be an airplane, blimp, or airship and use either a battery or hydrogen to store the energy produced by the solar cells and use that energy at night when solar energy is not available.

== Usage ==
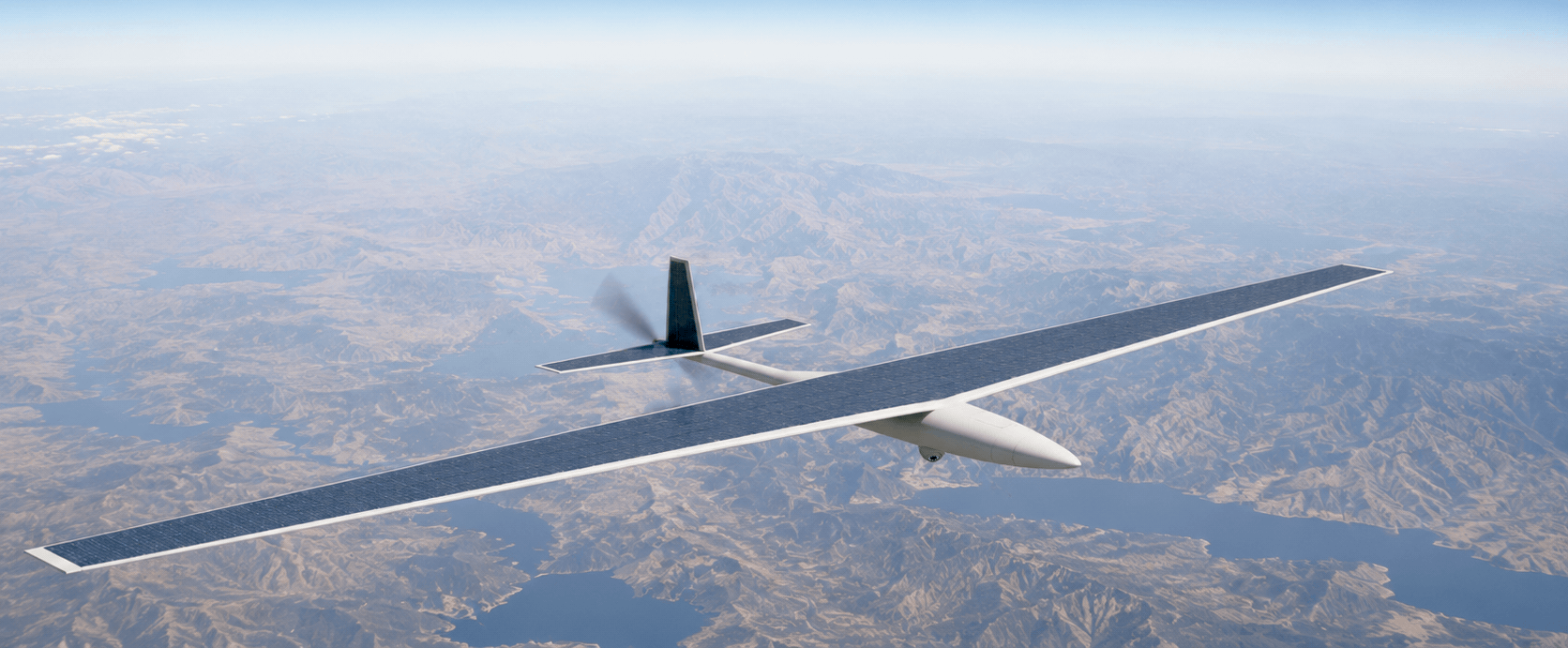
Solar drone concept rendering

Solar-powered aircraft do not require fuel, so they don't require oxygen, and they are able to operate at altitudes over 20 kilometres (12 mi) to 100 kilometres (62 mi) for months at a time.

Conventional passenger or cargo aircraft usages aren't practical yet with modern technology, but high-altitude platform stations and long-endurance missions over a fixed location with unmanned aircraft or airships are feasible. Thus solar-powered aircraft could be used in telecommunications, video/imagery, flight control by transporting airport surveillance radars, in precipitation detection by transporting weather radars, geopositioning Global Positioning Systems (GPS), and other pseudo satellite applications that transpond the data with ground stations.

== List of solar airplanes ==
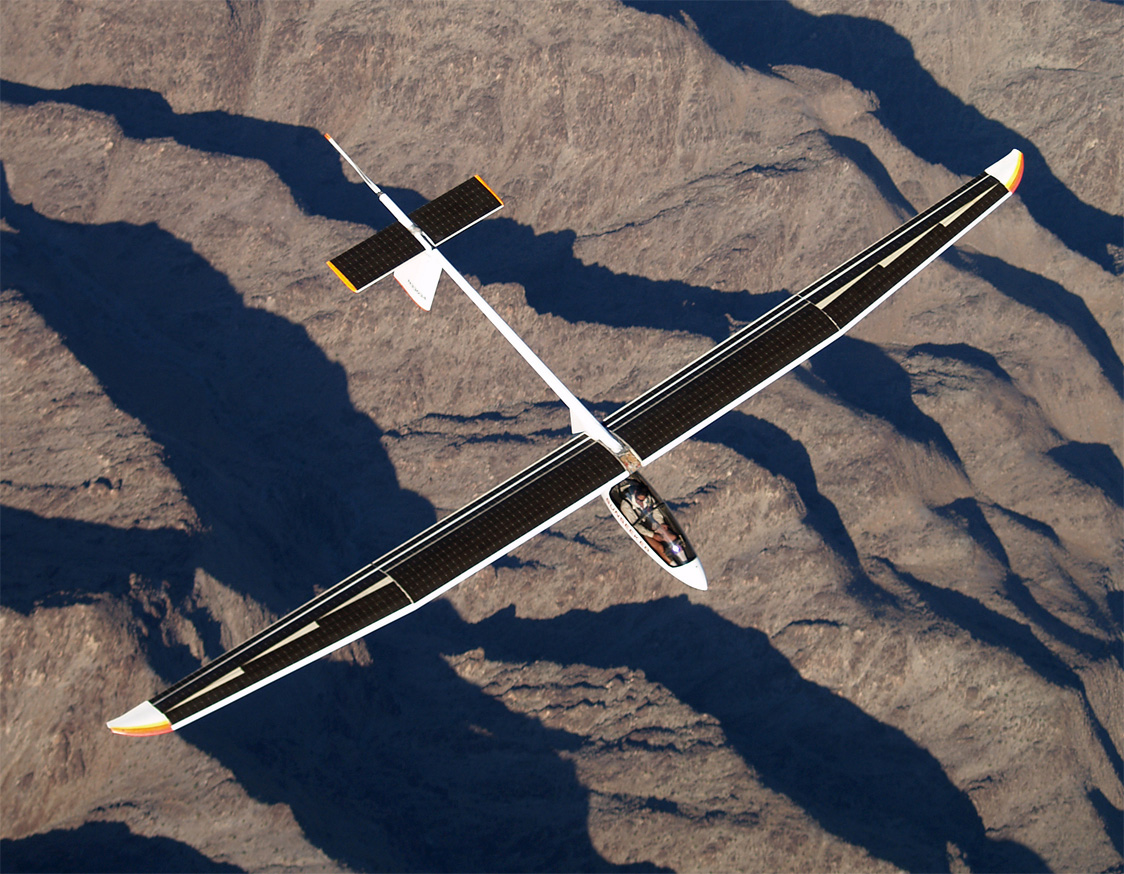
Sunseeker solar powered aircraft

This list is non-exhaustive.

- AstroFlight Sunrise - first uncrewed solar flight in 1974
- SolarOne - First manned solar flight in december 1978
- Mauro Solar Riser - first flight in April 1979
- MacCready Gossamer Penguin - second crewed solar flight in May 1980
- Pathfinder
- Centurion
- Helios
- Facebook Aquila
- Solar Impulse - first manned solar aircraft to circumnavigate the globe. Since reconfigured by Skydweller Aero into an uncrewed autonomous drone.
- Airbus Zephyr
- Kea Atmos Mk1 solar powered stratospheric HAPS
- BAE Systems PHASA-35
- HAPSMobile Hawk30
- SolarStratos -It is the highest manned solar- and electric-powered aircraft, having flown at an altitude of more than 9,500 metres

== Solar airships ==
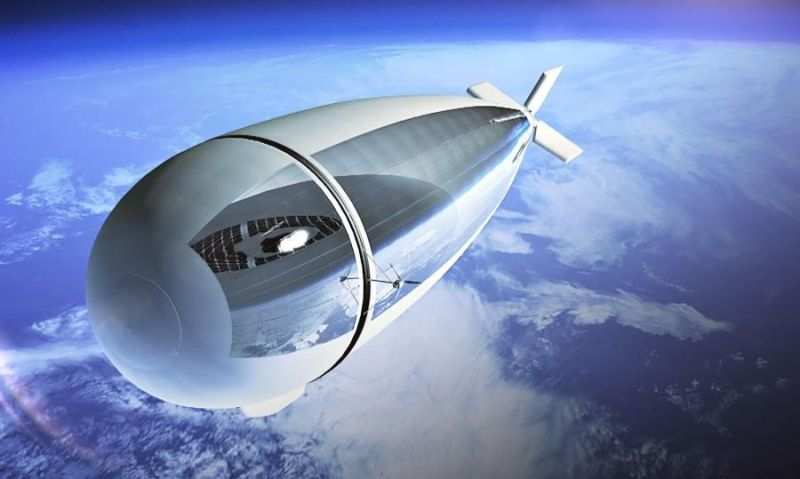
Stratobus high altitude airship

Solar Airship One is being developed by Euro Airship and is planning to launch a world tour in 2026 and fly by 25 countries in 20 days as it travels around the world non-stop.

It will be autonomous and use electrolysis to store hydrogen to keep moving at night when solar power is not available.

== See also ==
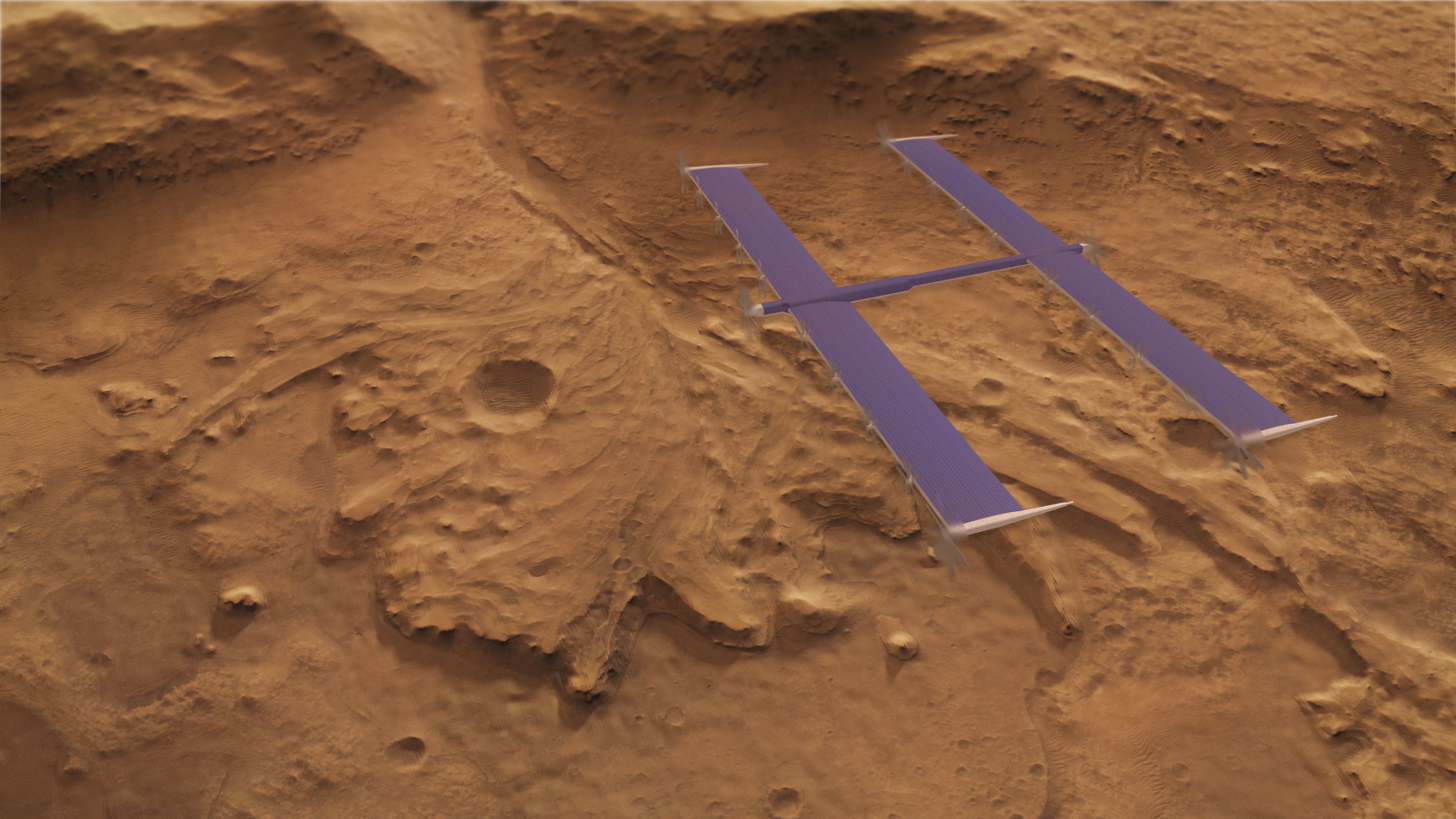
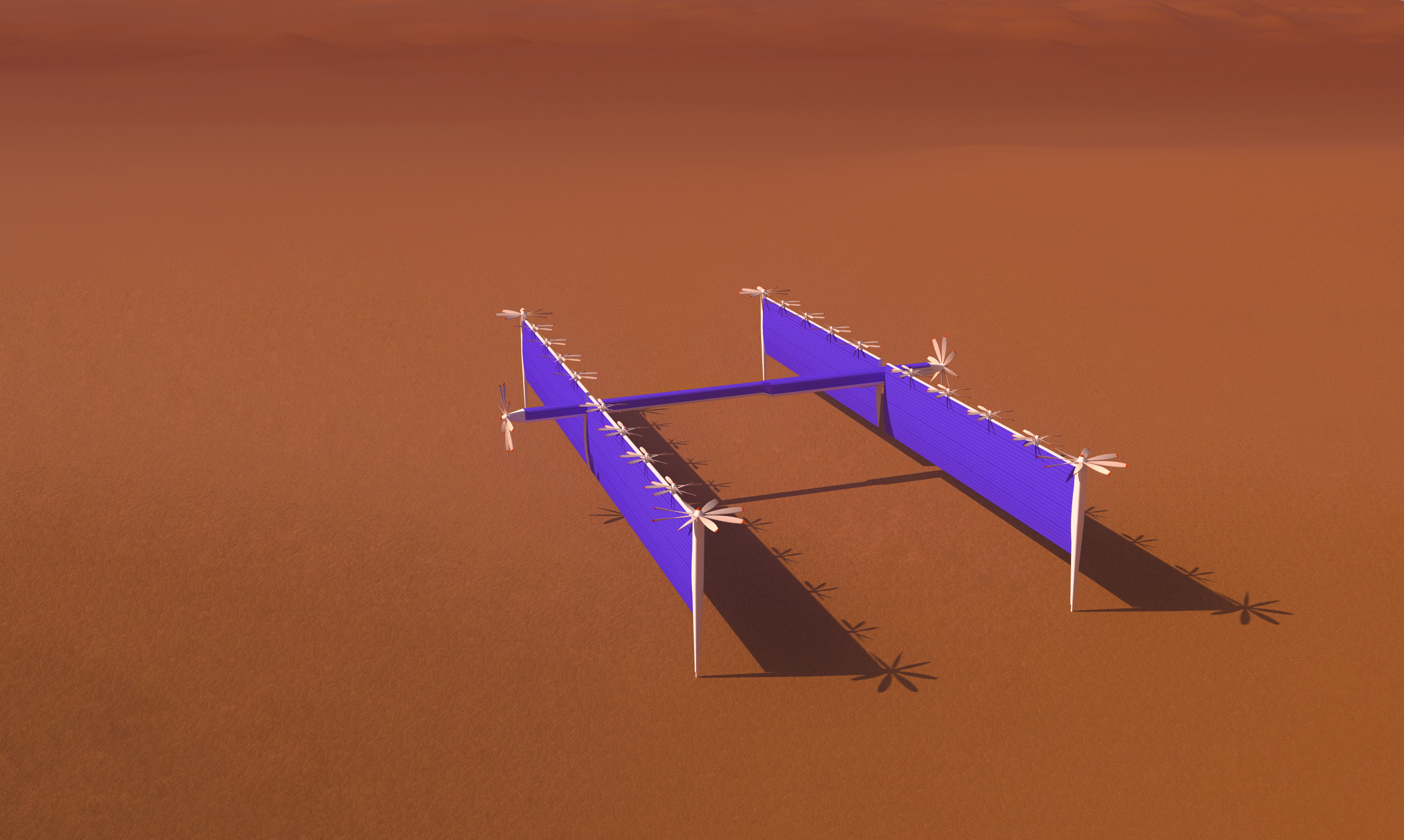
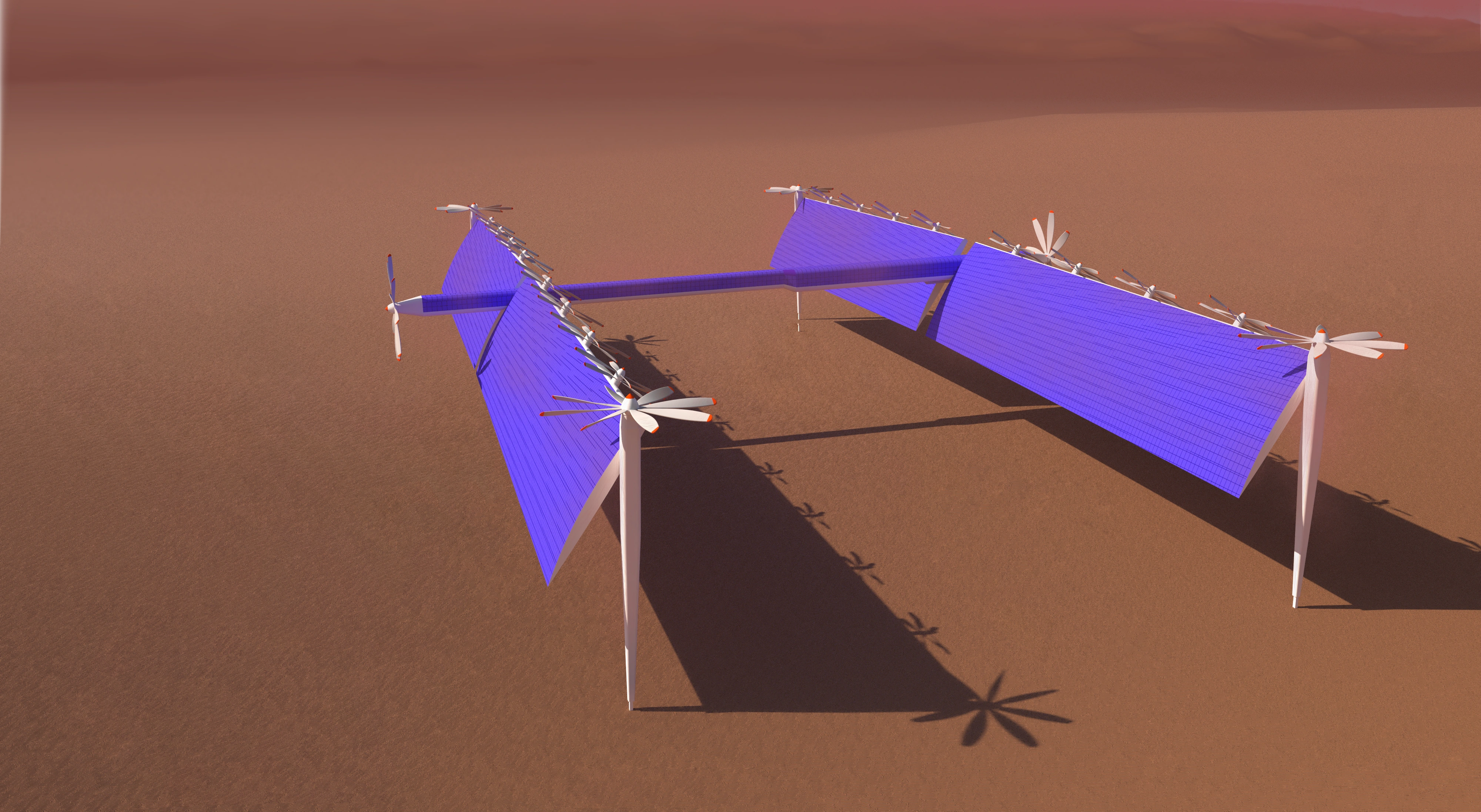
Solar-powered aircraft concept for Mars, Mars Aerial and Ground Global Intelligent Explorer (MAGGIE). VTOL capabilities to land and recharge the batteries.
- Aerobot
- Geostationary satellite
- High-altitude balloon
- Hydrogen-powered aircraft
- Ingenuity (helicopter) - Solar helicopter on Mars
- Mars Aerial and Ground Global Intelligent Explorer (MAGGIE) - proposed solar VTOL aircraft to fly in the atmosphere of mars
- 2023 Chinese balloon incident
- Aircraft Meteorological Data Relay
- Radiosonde - telemetry device carried by weather balloons
- Advanced Technology Demonstrator - next generation Doppler radar for weather and air traffic control
- Third-generation photovoltaic cell
