= Glossary of early twentieth century slang in the United States =

This glossary of early twentieth century slang in the United States is an alphabetical collection of colloquial expressions and their idiomatic meaning from the 1900s to the 1930s. This compilation highlights American slang from the 1920s and does not include foreign phrases. The glossary includes dated entries connected to bootlegging, criminal activities, drug usage, filmmaking, firearms, ethnic slurs, prison slang, sexuality, women's physical features, and sports metaphors. Some expressions are deemed inappropriate and offensive in today's context.

While slang is usually inappropriate for formal settings, this assortment includes well-known expressions from that time, with some still in use today, e.g., blind date, cutie-pie, freebie, and take the ball and run.

These items were gathered from published sources documenting 1920s slang, including books, PDFs, and websites. Verified references are provided for every entry in the listing.

== 0-9 ==
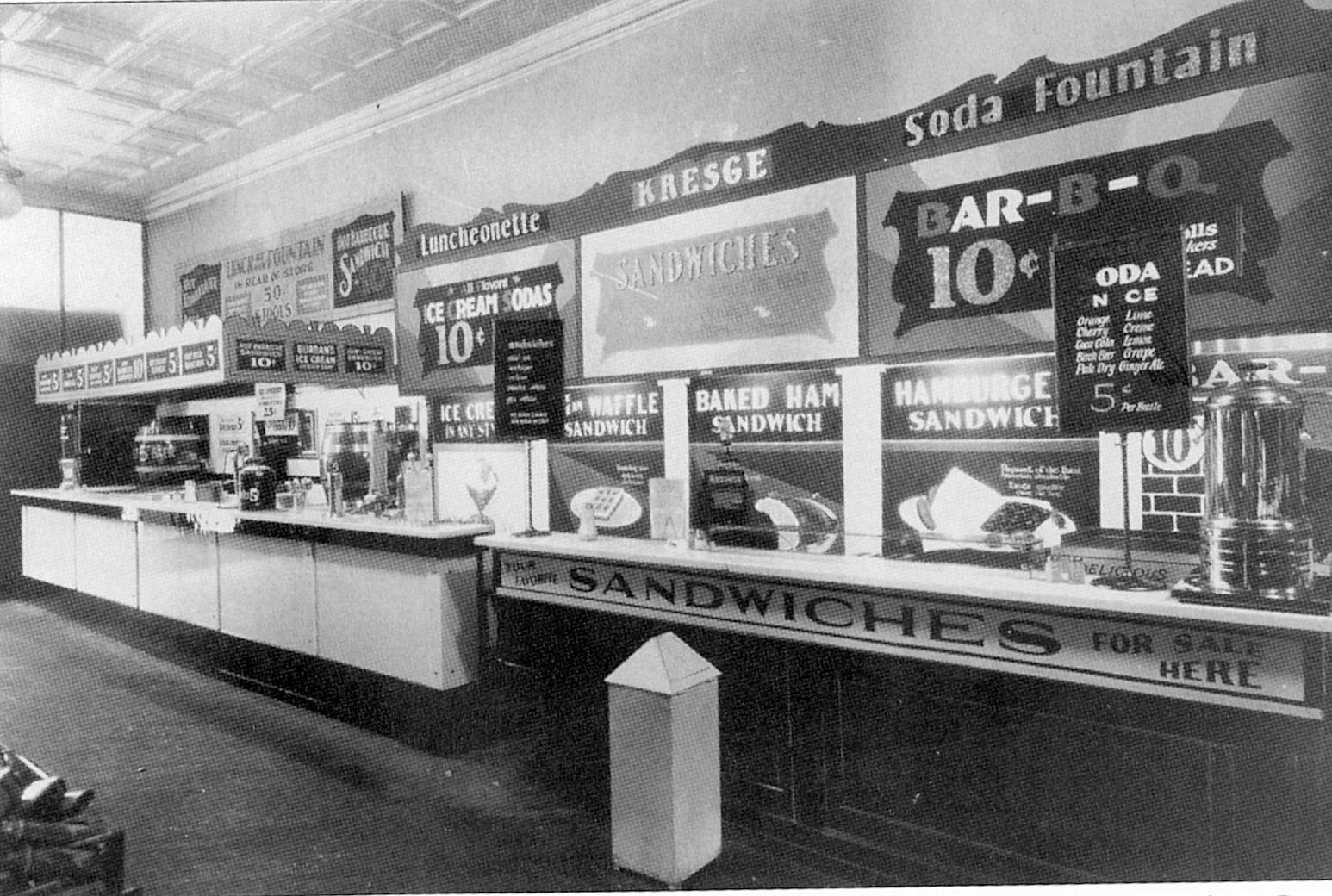
S.S. Kresge Lunch Counter and Soda Fountain, about 1920

86

1. Soda-counter term meaning an item was no longer available
2. "Eighty-six" means to discard, eliminate, or deny service

== A ==
A-1
First class
abe's cabe
1. Five dollar bill
2. See fin, a fiver, half a sawbuck
absent treatment
Engaging in dance with a cautious partner
ab-so-lute-ly
Affirmative, Yes
absotively
Absolutely and positively
ace
1. One dollar bill; see clam
2. An airplane adept
3. An artist in any line
acknowledge the corn
Admit responsibility for
ad
Advertisement; hence ad club
adam's ale
Water
african golf
The game of craps or dice
air tight
Very attractive
airedale
Unattractive man
alarm clock
Chaperone
alderman
Man's pot-belly or simply a prominent belly of a man; see bay window
alibi
Box of flowers or candy
alibi Ike
One who excuses all his faults
all in
Exhausted
all to the good
Everything is all right
all to the good, the mustard, etc
Excellent
all wet
Erroneous idea or individual e.g. "He's all Wet"
alley worker
A woman thief who robs men in alleys
almighty, dollar
Money, the god of america
also ran
A loser
altogether, in the
Nude, naked
ambulance-chaser
A shyster lawyer who goes after injured people to solicit their damage suits
amuck, to run
To behave crazily
ananias Club, member of the
A liar; anyone who differed with Theodore Roosevelt
and how!
I strongly agree!
angel
Man who finances a theatrical or other venture, usually for no angelic reason
angora, to get one's
To discomfit or rattle one
animated ivories or cubes
Dice
ankle
To walk, e.g. "Let's ankle!"
anvil chorus
A chorus of knockers or depreciators
anyhoo
Used when you want to change the topic of conversation
ankle excursion
Walk, i.e. walk home
apple-knocker
1. Farm laborer mostly a Fruit picker
2. Country bumpkin or Hick

Example
A "cotton glaumer" picks cotton, an "apple knocker" picks apples and other fruit

— 1923 book by Nels Anderson

applesauce
1. Flattery
2. Blah, tripe, nonsense, foolish talk e.g."Aw, Applesauce!"
apple strudel
Concentrated apple sauce i.e.nonsense, foolish talk

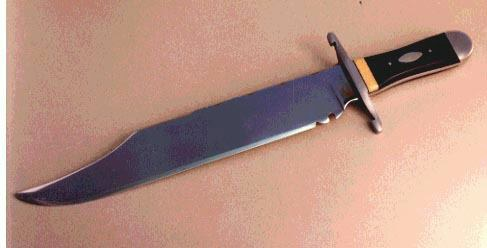
Bowie Knife made by Tim Lively

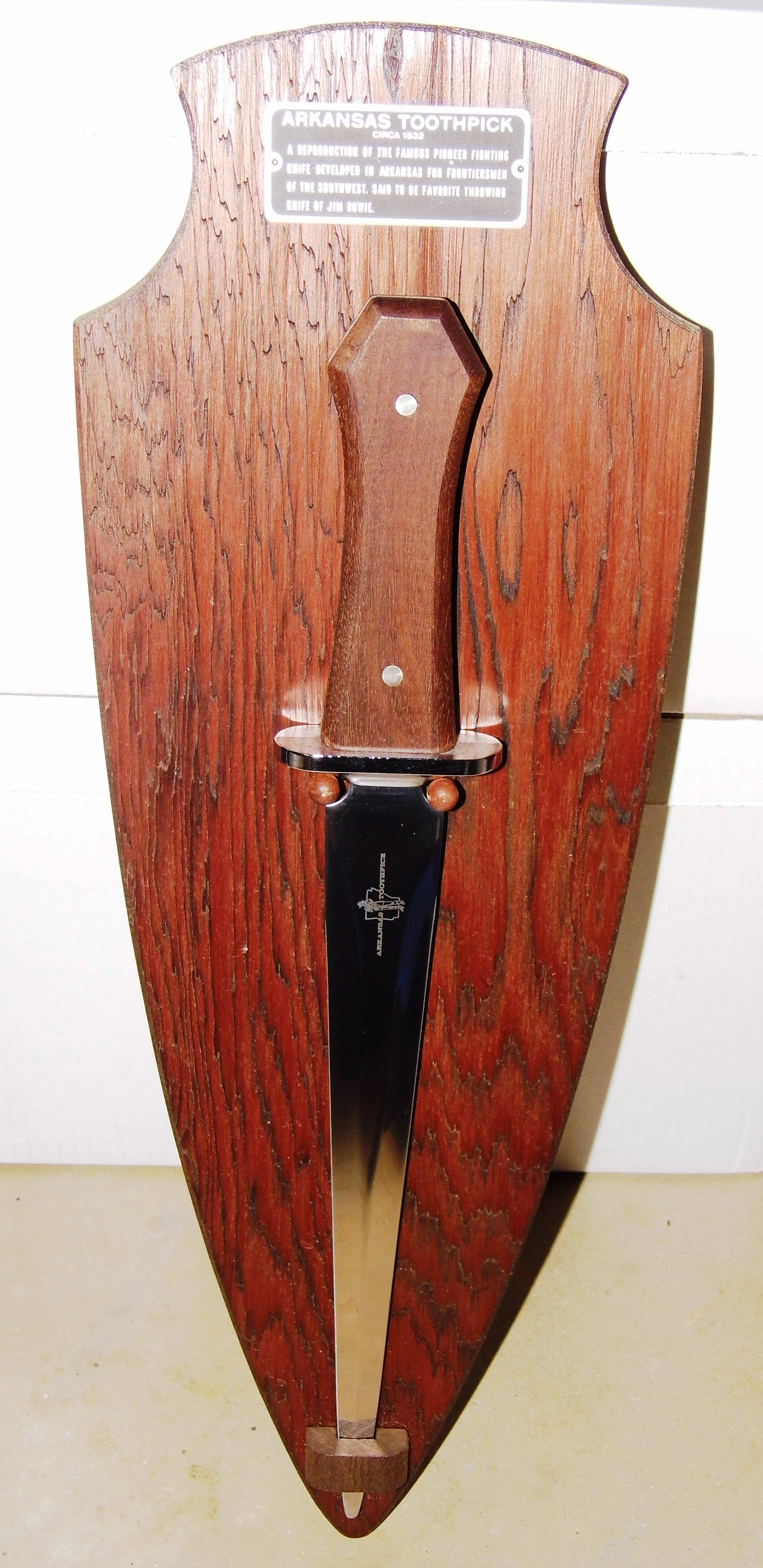
17 1/2-inches long Arkansas Toothpick

arkansas toothpick

A sheath or bowie knife
armchair
Love nest
ass
A fool
attaboy!
Well done! or Attagirl!
attic
Empty part of a house; hence head, upper story
automat
A nickel-in-the-slot restaurant
awfully
Very much

== B ==
b.v.d.
A man's underclothing
babbitt
Typical mediocre-brained middle class American, realtor or otherwise
babe
Attractive person usually a woman and sometimes meaning a significant other
baby
Something of high value or respect including your sweetheart
baby doll
One's sweetheart
baby grand
Heavily built man
back-scratcher
One who praises you for your praise of him, her or it
bad egg, bad penny, etc
A good-for-naught
bad go to the
Attend Sunday movies, dance, or otherwise offend the rotary methodist god
bad, to the
Having suffered loss
badger game

An extortion scheme that loosely takes its name from the illegal practice of badger-baiting. It revolves around a scheme to deceive someone, put them in a compromising position, and then extort money from them.
bag, to hold the
To be left responsible while others escape
baggage smasher
Hotel porter who handles trunks
bald-headed row
Front row at a girlie leg show
ball, to play
Go ahead
balled up
Confused, messed up
balty, bats in, the belfry
Crazy
bally nipper
Tomboy
baloney
Nonsense
bamboozle
Obtain by trickery
banana oil
The act of using insincere flattery and deception, particularly with the intention to deceive
bang-up
First rate
bang the ivories
Play the piano
bang to rights
caught bang to rights i.e. "Caught in the act" e.g. "We've got you bang to rights handling stolen property"
bangtails
Race horses whose tail is cut horizontally to resemble a tassel e.g. "I wagered on those bangtails in the third race."
bank's closed
No kissing or making out e.g. Sorry, Mac, the bank's closed!
barber
Talkative individual
barber shop chord
Male quartette harmony; barbarous music
barge
Walk along
barleycorn, John
Spirit of alcohol, exiled by Volstead
barn-stormer
Strolling player
barney
Scandal walker
barneymugging
Love-making
barnumize
To advertise in high-falutin' language
barrelhouse

cheap saloon speakeasy or brothel
bathtub gin

Homemade spirit, made in a bathtub
battle royal
Indiscriminate boxing match of three or more
bay window
Funny, yet unflattering nickname for a man's pot belly e.g. He's trim and tough, with no bay window and zero patience; see alderman
be on the nut
To be broke
beak, beagle
Nose
bean-eater
Bostonian
bean-picker
Person who tries to patch up trouble
bean-shooter
Gun
beans, not to know
To, know nothing
bear
One who speculated' for a fall in stocks; opposite of bull
bear, she's a
She's a wow, a wonder
bearcat
Hot-blooded, vivacious woman
beat
In journalism, precedence in news; a scoop
beat around the bush
To dodge the issue
beat it
Clear a way; vamoose; depart; scram, get lost
beat one's gums
Idle chatter e.g. someone "beats one's gums"or "Flap one's gums"
beats the devil, the dutch
Beats everything
beau, beau-lover
Suitor, lover
bedbug
An amorous or uxorious person
bee in one's bonnet
To be obsessed with an idea
bee's knees, the
Something or someone outstanding, remarkably fantastic, or awesome (Note: Animal alternatives having the same meaning as Bee's Knees Bee's ankles, bee's knee's, Bullfrog's beard, Canary's tusks, Cat's Canary, Cat's cuffs, Cat's eye, Cat's eyebrows, Cat's kimono, cat's meow, cat's pajamas, Cat's underwear, Cat's whiskers, Clam's garters, Cuckoo's chin, Dog's ankles, Dog's bollocks, Duck's Quack, Eel's hips, Eel's ankle, Elephant's adenoids, Elephant's fallen arches, Elephant's eyebrows, Elephant's instep, Elephant's hips, Elephant's wrist, Frog's ankles, Frog's elbow, Frog's eyebrows, Gnat's elbow, Goat's whiskers, Grasshopper's knees, Hen's eyebrows, Kitten's ankles, Leopard's stripes, Monkey's eyebrows, Pig's feet, Pig's wings, Puppy's tail, Pussycat's whiskers, Sardine's whiskers, Snake's ears, Snake's hips, Snugglepup's bow-bow, Spider's ankles, Tiger's spots, Turtle's neck,)
beef
Problem, e.g. "What's your beef?"
beer, small
Anything unimportant
beeswax
Business, e.g. "none of your beeswax"
beezer
Nose; see also schnozzle smeller

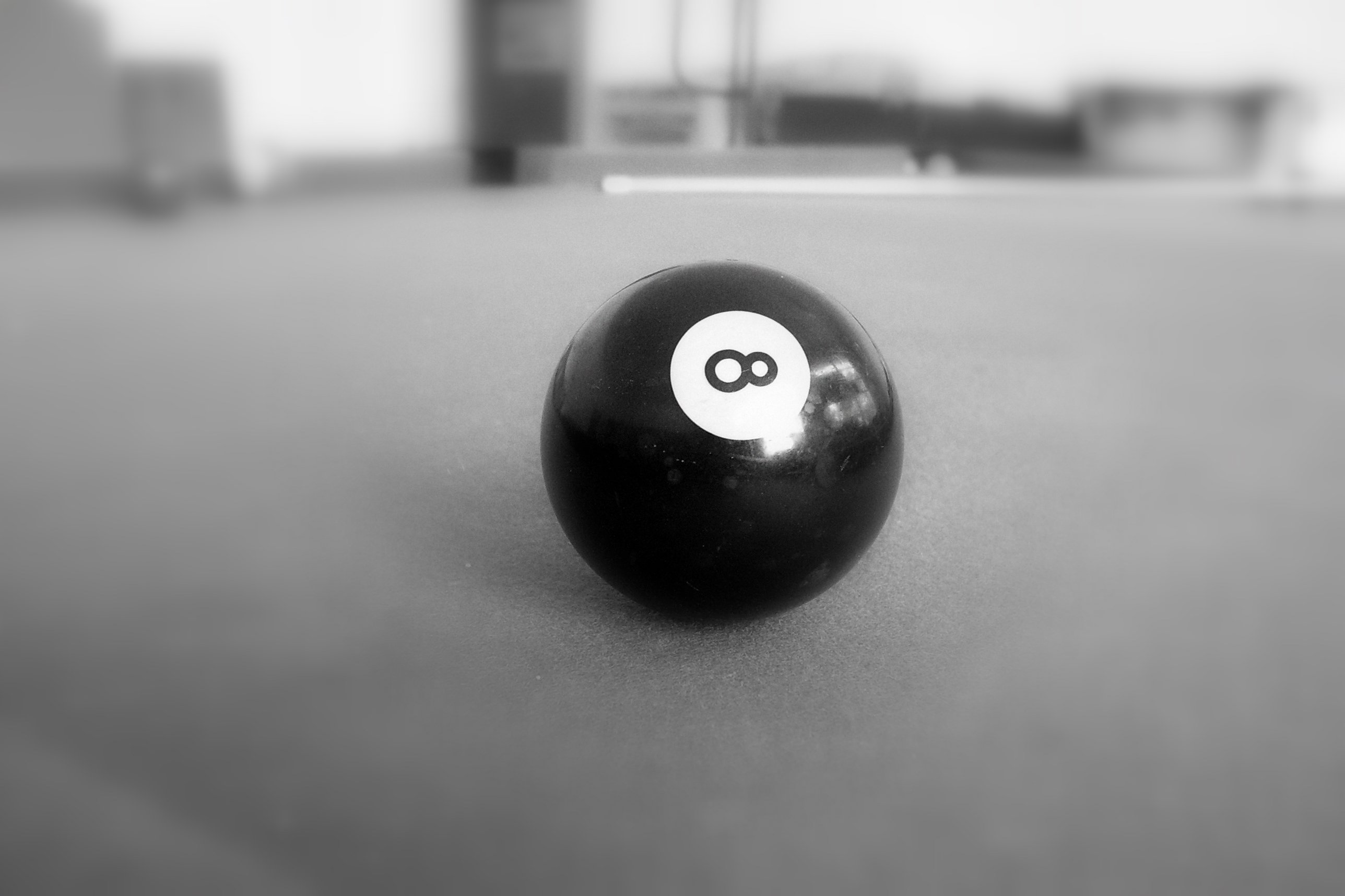
Photograph of an 8 ball

behind the eight ball

In a difficult position e.g. In a § Jam
believe me
Expletive, "this is true"
bell bottom

Sailor
bell polisher
Man who lingers in apartment vestibule late at night
belly laugh
Deep, full-bodied laugh
bellyache
Complain all the time
belly-bumper, -buster, or -whopper
Small hand sled used for coasting, lying on one's stomach
bellywash
Soft drink, soda water, etc
belt
Drink, swallow or swig of liquor
bent
1. Individual who is intoxicated or inebriated; see § drunk; also derivative bent outta of shape; see bent outta of shape (Note: In the early 20th century, people commonly used these terms to describe being inebriated: Dalzell 2012, pp. 12: Bent; Blind; Blotto; Bolognied; Canned; Crocked; Boiled as an owl; Corked; Embalmed; Fried; Fried to the Hat; Half Seas Over; Half Under; Hoary-eyed; Jammed; Jazzed; Jiggered; Juiced; Lit; Oiled; Out like a light; Out on the roof; Ossified; Owled; Pie-eyed; Piffled; Plastered; Polluted; Potted; Primed; Shellacked; Shot; Stew to the hat.; Scrooched; Smoked; Spifficated; Tanked; Zozzled)
2. Spoiled and ruined 1910s
3. Person who is criminal and corrupt 1910s
bent cars
Stolen Automobiles; 1930s
bent outta of shape
Alternate name for intoxicated; see § drunk
bent hairpin
Elderly maid
benzine buggy
Automobile
berries
Great or Money e.g. "It's the Berries"
berry patch
1. A man's special attraction to a girl
2. The intimate area of a woman e.g."You won't be seeing my berry patch tonight, pal."
bet, you
Absolutely. also bet your boots, last dollar
better half
What a man calls his wife in her presence
biff
A blow

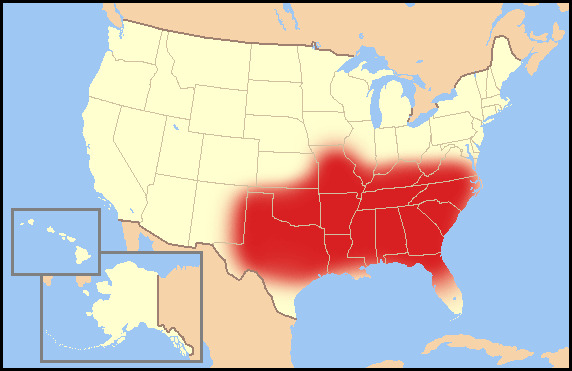
Map showing the Bible Belt

bible belt

Area in the south and midwest where fundamentalism flourishes
big burg, big town
A city
big cheese

Someone of importance and influence e.g. the big boss;
big drink
The Mississippi; any ocean
big head, to have a
To be conceited

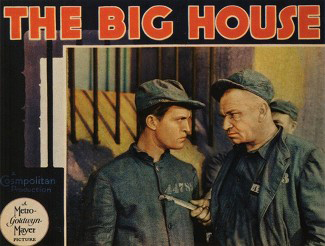
Lobby card for the 1930 movie – The Big House

big house

Prison
big mouth
A noisy, bragging person
big one
Death
big pond or puddle
The Atlantic ocean
big shot
Someone of importance and influence; Big boss; see big cheese
big six
From auto advertising, for the new and powerful six cylinder engines inferring a Strong man e.g. Go send our big six to collect the money
big sleep
Death
big stiff, big cheese
Anyone who disagrees with you
big timer
Charming and romantic man
bilge
Bunk, blah, flapdoodle, nonsense
billboard
Flashy man or woman
bim
Woman
bimbo

Tough guy or strong man; see also hard-boiled Bruno

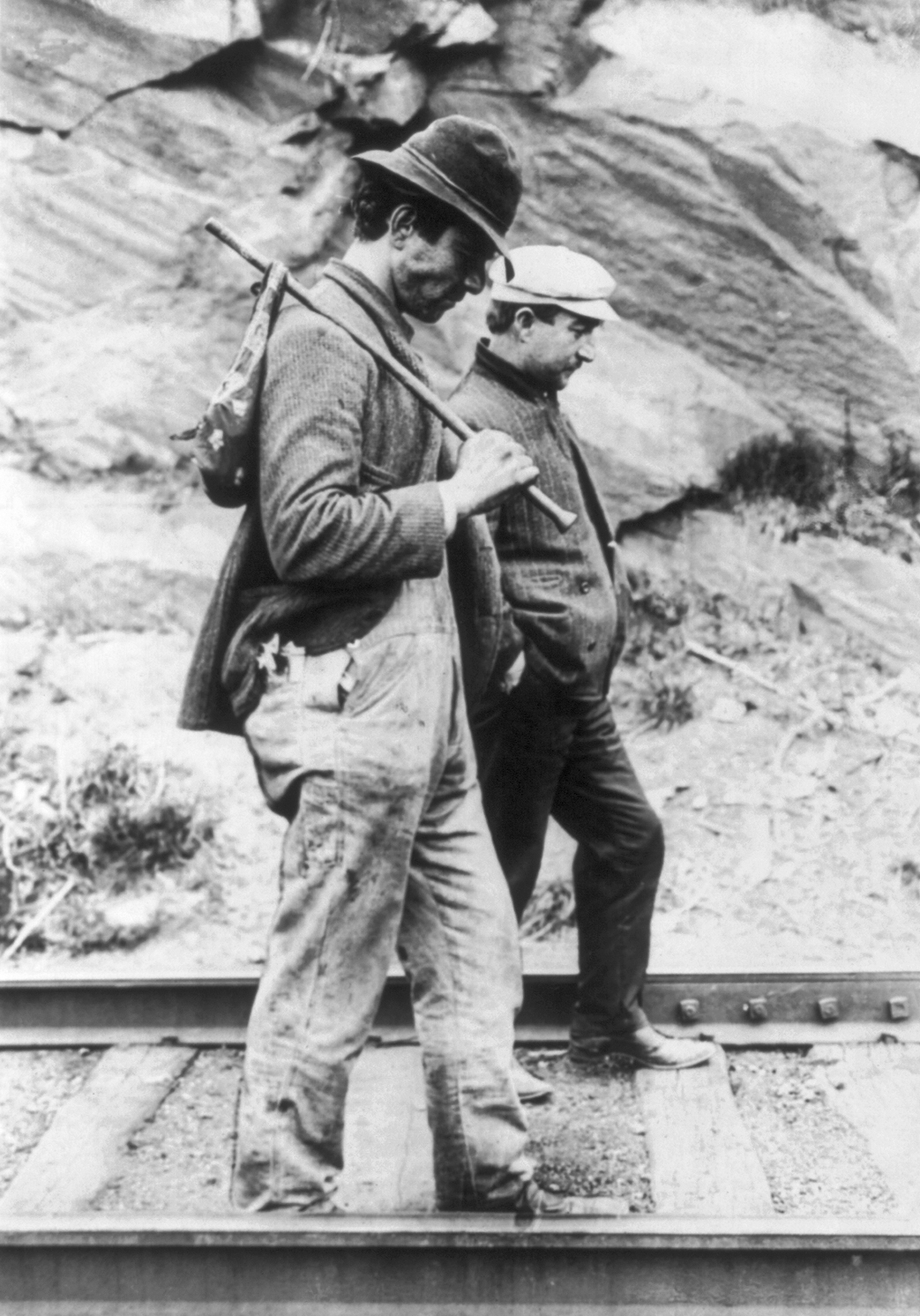
Two hobos walking along railroad tracks after being put off a train. One is carrying a bindle

bindle

The bundle containing cloths and possessions usually carried by a tramp
bindle Punk Or Bindle Stiff
Tramps or hobos; Migratory harvest workers
bing
Solitary confinement cell used for punishment
bingle
to hit, usually used in the context of baseball
bird
1. Broad term for a man or woman, sometimes indicating "unusual," behavior e.g. "what a funny old bird"
2. A young girl; anything attractive
birthday suit
Nature's garb; nudity
biscuit
Pettable flapper
bit
1. United states money equivalent to 12½ cents
2. Prison sentence
bite the dust
Be slain
blaah
No good
black Hand
A Spanish, Italian or Sicilian secret society of criminals
black hats
Bad person, especially a villain or criminal in a movie, novel, or play; Heavy in a movie e.g. The Black hats show up at the mansion
black Maria
The calaboose, police wagon to take criminals to jail or station house
blah
Bunk, nonsense, spreadeagle talk
blarney
Wheedling flattery; pretty talk
blazes, go to
Go to hell
blazes, like
Violently, impetuously (from the flames of hell)
bleed, to
To victimize, extort money from
blimp
Any non-rigid balloon
blind
1. Alternate names for intoxicated; Drunken bout; see § drunk
blind date

An appointment is set for a show or dance where your partner is someone you don't know, usually a friend of a friend
blind pig

Unlicensed, illegal drinking establishment e.g. They just opened a new blind pig down the street serving some first-class hooch; see speakeasy
blind tiger

Unlicensed, illegal drinking establishment e.g. They just opened a new blind tiger down the street serving some first-class hooch; see speakeasy
blink, on the
On the fritz; no good
blip off
Kill someone
bloated aristocrat, bloated bondholder
Wealthy person
blockhead
Dunce, fool
blooey
Condition when one has gone to pieces
bloody shirt, to wave the
To stir up political strife
blotto
Alternate names for intoxicated
§ drunk
blouse
Leave from somewhere
blow
1. Crazy party
2. To boast or brag
3. Leave
3. Big wad in nightclubs; spend one's money excessively or irresponsibly
4. Cocaine
blow in
Come in unexpectedly
blow one's own horn
To praise oneself
blow-out
Feast, spread; puncture, as of auto tire
blue funk
Nervous apprehension or agitation
blue in the face
Aghast with amazement or fear
blue laws
Severe puritanic laws
blue moon, once in a
Hardly ever
blue pencil, to
To edit
blues
Depression; a jazz or ragtime tune
blue-sky laws
Laws concerning corporations so loose that everything gets through; the sky the limit
blue-stocking
A puritan, one holier-than-thou
blow someone down
Kill or murder someone; blow someone away

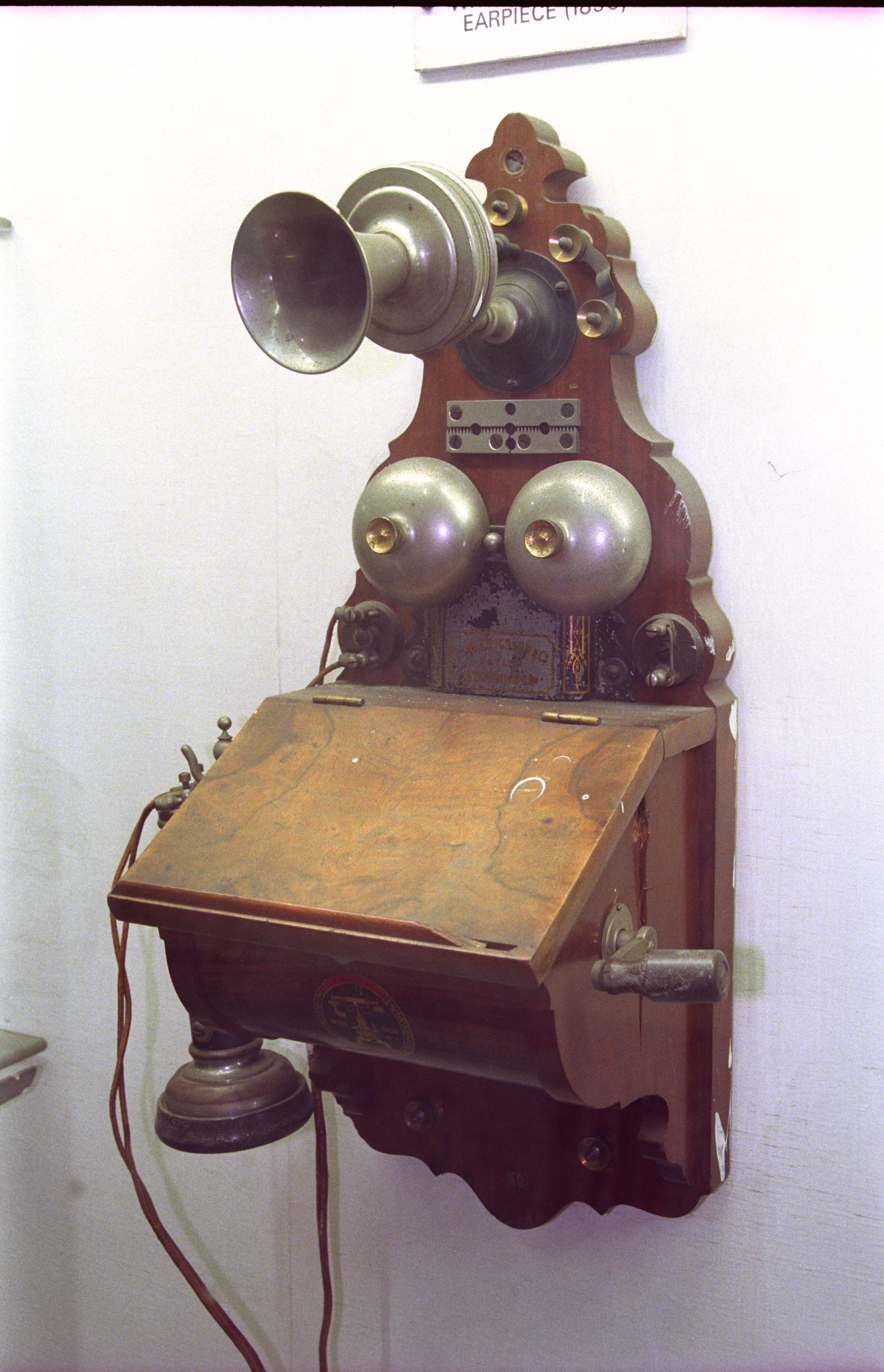
Wooden wall telephone with a hand-cranked magneto generator

blower

Telephone
blue serge
Sweetheart
bluenose
Excessively puritanical person; prude
bluff
Bragging, assertion without foundation
bluff, to call a
To call for a show-down
blurb
Printed praise, usually excessive
blushing violet
Publicity hound
bo
Man; see also buster mac pal

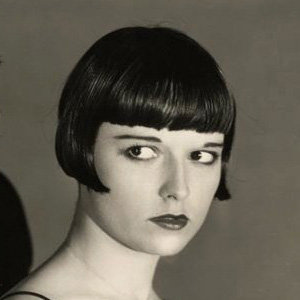
Louise Brooks styling a "shingle" bob cut in 1929

bob
To cut the hair short
bob cut

There were various bob haircuts, but the most common involved cutting both the bangs and back in a straight line, typically with the back shorter and off the neck i.e. shingle bob; e.g. Most flappers had their hair bobbed
bogus
Spurious, sham
bohemian
Artistic, as life in an artists' quarter
bohunk

1. Derogatory name for an Eastern European immigrant (out of use by 1930) except in certain anti-immigrant circles; See Ku Klux Klan
2. Stupid, clumsy person
boiled
Drunk, pickled, stewed, stewed to the gills, lit, illuminated, soused
boiled as an owl
Alternate names for intoxicated; see § drunk
boiler
Automobile
bolsheviki, bolshevik
Anything you disagree with, from Russian communist policies to prohibition
bonanza
A profitable investment; a lucky strike
bone dry
No liquor available. but see speakeasy, blind pig, blind tiger, bootleg, rum row, etc.
bone, to pull a
To make a stupid mistake
bonehead
A dull, stupid, or awkward fellow
bones
Dice, the ivory cubes, the galloping dominoes
bones, to make no bones about
To speak directly
boob
Dumb guy
boob-tickler
Girl who has to entertain her father's customers from out of town
boodle
Illegal gain or graft
bookkeeping
The art of making a date
bootleg
To sell illegal liquor
booklegger

1. Dealer in suppressed novels
2. Someone who makes or sells alcohol illegally
boom
To advertise extensively; to puff
boom
Inflated values, as in Florida and California real estate
boost
To aid by pushing upward. hence booster
booze

Drink or shot of Alcohol
boozehound
Heavy consumer of alcohol
bop
To kill
bosh
Nonsense; twaddle
bosom fly
A petter or Necker; from "let me to thy bosom fly"
boss
Master or employer
bottle
The drinking habit
bounce, get the
To be discharged-- from a job also, get the sack
bouncer
One who throws out objectionable persons
bourbon
A stubborn conservative; old rye whiskey
bowled over
Put out of commission
box
Safe or a bar
box job
Safecracking
bozo
Person; a term of address
brace
Interrogate informally; confront someone; Beg for money
bracer
A stimulant, an alcoholic drink

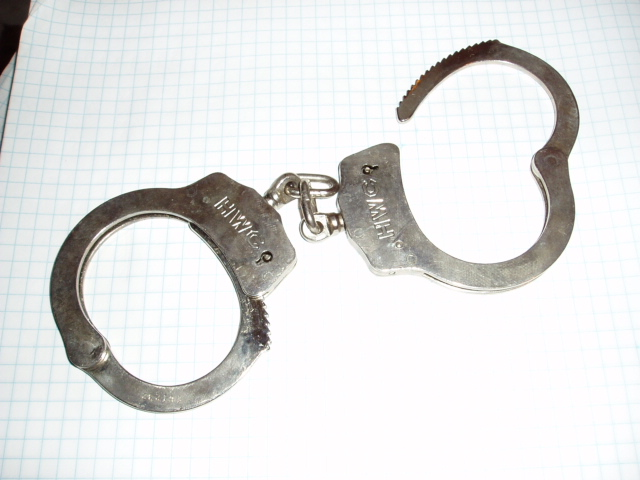
Pair of Handcuffs

bracelets

Handcuffs (term originated before the 20th century) e.g. The house dick slapped a pair of bracelets on me
brainstorm
Sudden and violent cerebral disturbance; mental attitude of any rich criminal
brand-new
Absolutely new
brass
Bare-faced impudence
bread-and-butter
One's living
break it up
Stop that; quit the nonsense; stop quarreling and fighting
break the ice
To overcome diffidence on first meeting
breeches, to wear the
To rule the house; said too frequently of women
breeze
1. Breeze Off i.e. leave; depart
2. Leave; move; go quickly
breezer
Convertible car
breezy
Easy going; jovial; cheerful e.g. One movie reviewer refer to the hero of a film A Stranger from Somewhere as a Breezy Westerner
brick
A first rate person. Also "a regular brick"
brillo
Someone who lives fast and is a big spender
briny, the
The sea or ocean
bro
a friend. short for "brother"
broad

Expression used solely by men to refer to a woman and widely considered offensive by women
brodie
To take a chance; from Steve Brodie's successful leap from Brooklyn bridge
broke, clear, dead, or stone
Penniless
bromide
A commonplace bore; a stale jest
bronx cheer

1. Loud spluttering noise mimicking fluctuance that expresses complete disapproval
2. see raspberry
brown
Whiskey in the 1920s
bruiser
A boxer, or pugilist
bruno
Tough guy, strong man, enforcer; see also bimbo hard-boiled
brush-ape
Anyone from the sticks; hayshaker, farmer
bub(s)
Female breast(s)
buck
A dandy; also, a dollar
buck the tiger
Gamble, play against the bank
buck up
Be encouraged
buck, pass the
To shift responsibility
bucket
Automobile; see also cowpie crate heap jalopy
bucket shop
A gambling den with faked dealing in stocks and bonds
bud
A debutante
buddy
Companion in arms; chum
buff
The skin; hence, in the buff naked
bug, a
A fanatic; as, a radio bug
bug eyed
Amazed: astounded in the 1920s i.e. He looked all bug-eyed
bug's ear
1. Always with the connotation of being small e.g.Your baby is cuter than a bug's ear
2. Attractive, Charming i.e. cute as a bug's ear
bugger-lugger
A factory hand
bugs
Go crazy
bulge, the
Advantage e.g. have the bulge on
bull
1. Nonsense, exaggerated lies; chat idly, to exaggerate; hence, bull thrower, toreador, etc
2. Stock speculator playing for a rise
3. Uniformed policeman; law-enforcement official; plainclothes cop
4. railroad security guard
bull session
Male talkfest, gossip, stories of sexual exploits
bully
Splendid; excellent
bullyrag
To threaten, to scold
bum
Hobo. hence, on the bum, ruined, broke
bum's rush
Thrown out of an establishment
bump
Kill, murder, assassination
bump gums
Argue; talk excessively; see run one's gums
bump off
Kill, murder, assassinate
bum's rush
Old method of ejecting bums from saloons
bunco
To swindle or rob. hence, bunco-game, bunco-steerer. a bunco man's decoy
bunk
Nonsense
bunny
Term of endearment applied to the lost, confused, etc often coupled with "poor little"
burbank
To create a new hybrid plant or animal
burn powder
Fire a gun
bus
Automobile, airplane, boat, large truck; 1910s
bush league
Second rate
bushwa
Euphemism for "bulls#*%"
bust
1. A drunken revel, a spree
2. Boxer
busthead

Illicitly distilled liquor
buster
Man; see also bo mac pal
busy as a one-arm paper-hanger with the barber's itch
Very busy
butter and egg man
1. Man with the bankroll or money
2. A prosperous dairy farmer (or other wealthy rural citizen), seen as coming into the big city and ostentatiously living it up.
3. Well-to-do mid-western salesman in new York, playing with shebas and vamps; a sugar-coated papa.
buzz-wagon, buzz-buggy
An automobile
buzzer
Policeman or private detective's badge

== C ==
C

cocaine

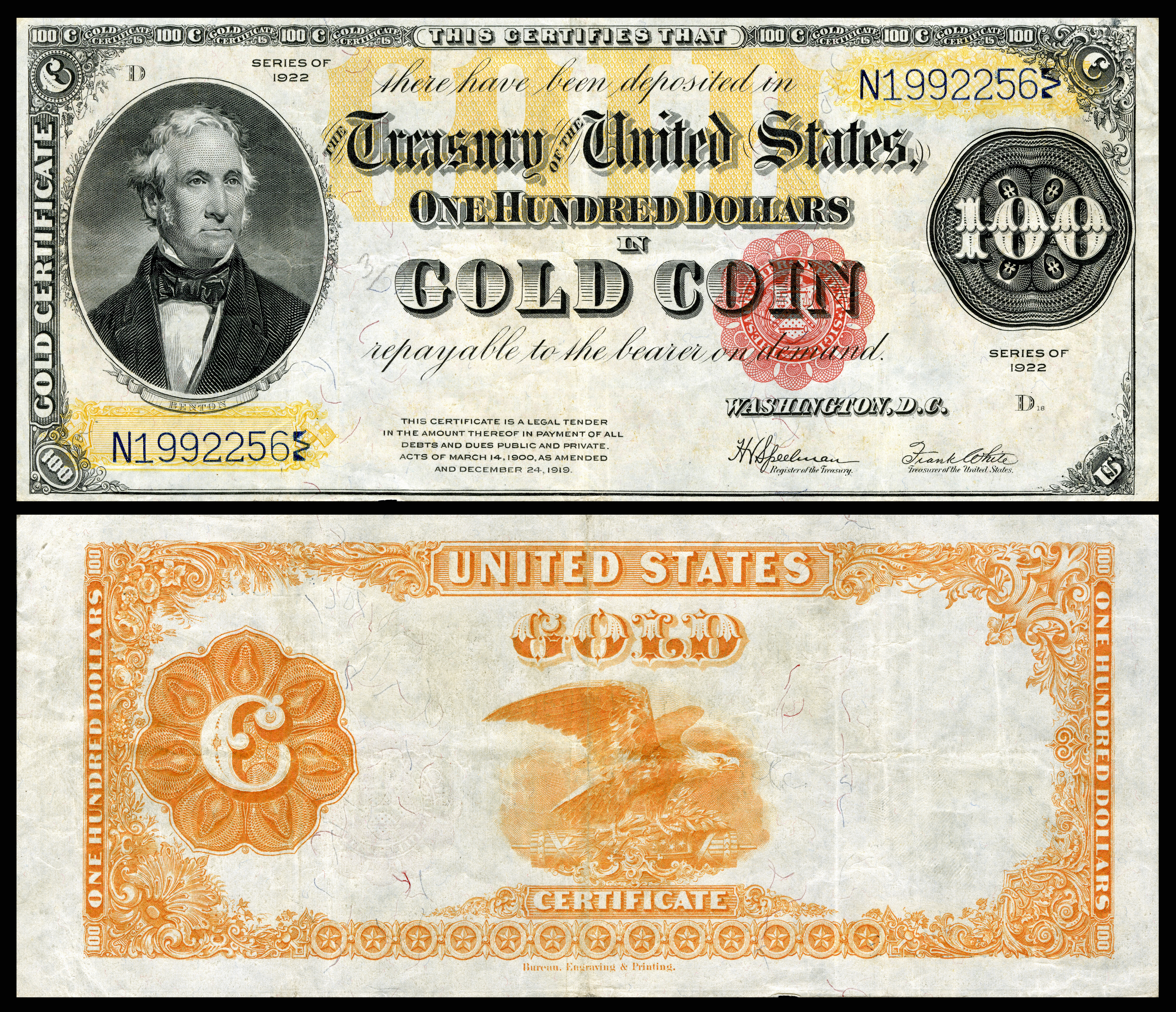
A series 1922 one-hundred dollar gold certificate

c note

$100 e.g. pair of c's = $200
c.o.
Conscientious objector
c.o.d.
Cash on delivery; no credit
cabbage

Money
caboodle
Aggregate, whole collection
caboose
Jail
cadet
Pimp, pander, procurer; west point undergraduate
cain, to raise
To raise hell
cake basket
Limousine
cake eater
1. Often a cake eater was the opposite of a flapper e.g.The individual is dressed in tight-fitting attire, including a belted coat with pointed lapels, one-button pants, a low snug collar, and a greenish-pink shirt with a jazzbo tie; see flaming youth
2. Spoiled rich person; Playboy
3. Lady's man
4. Self-indulgent effeminate young man
5. A tea-hound, lounge-lizard, lady-bug

Example
"It calls for a picked clientele of fans who are able to visualize and distinguish mortal from immortal as portrayed in the flesh. It will not appeal to the Flapper, the Lounge Lizard and Cake Eater, nor to the less intelligent."

— 1923 Exhibitor's Trade Review assessment of the film – Puritan Passions

call down
To reprove, to censure
can
1. Prison; holding cell at a police station; being imprisoned 1910s
2. Dilapidated, run-down automobile; 1920s
can house
Bordello; brothel
can it
Forget it. hence, can the chatter. shut up
can opener
Safecracker who opens cheap safes
canary
1. Informer; stool pigeon
2. Female vocalist typically fronting a band
canceled stamp
Shy girl at a dance or party
canned

Intoxicated; § drunk
canned music
Phonograph or radio music
cannery
prison
cannon-fodder
Soldiers
canoodle
To bill and coo
canuck, Kanuck
A French Canadian
cap, to set one's cap for
To try to vamp
cape Cod turkey
Salted codfish
caper
1. Criminal act or robbery
2. Drunken spree
capital
Splendid, excellent
captain of industry
A wholesale human wolf, who buries his bones in profitable investments
card
A character; "he's a card"
carpet-bagger
A non-resident politician
carry a torch
Developing strong emotions for someone, yet enduring unrequited love
case
Queer or eccentric character
case dough
Using one's last remaining funds
cash
Kiss
cash or check
Do we kiss now or later?
cash in
Settle one's accounts
cash in one's chips
To die
cast a kitten
1. Expressing intense and unexpected emotions; see have kittens
2. Experience a sudden outburst of laughter, fear, or anger e.g. "He got so upset, I thought he was going to have kittens."
cat
Man
cat's meow
Someone who is smug and content with themselves; see bee's knee's

Example
The Rent Collector (Vitagraph), with Larry Semon — A scream, a whirlwind, a cyclone of fun. For action and real fun his comedies are the snake's hips and the cat's meow.

— 1923 Exhibitors Herald Patron's Movie Review

cat's pajamas
see bee's knee's
cat's whiskers, cat's pajamas, cat's meaow, elephant's fallen arches, snake's hips
Something excellent
catspaw
A tool or dupe
catch
An eligible unmarried man or girl
catch-word,
A popular phrase used to get votes
cater-cornered
Placed corner-wise or diagonally
caveman
Modern forcible wooer
cellar smeller
Man with a penchant for showing up where liquor is being served
celestial

Derogatory term for Chinese or East Asians
century
One hundred dollars i.e. $100
chained lightning
White mule; southern mountain whiskey
chair, the
The electric chair, for electrocution or a permanent wave
change
Loose money
character
A person of striking peculiarities
charlie
Man with a mustache
chassis
Female body
chaw up
To demolish utterly, smash
cheaters

Eyeglasses
check
Kiss me later
check your hat
Call me later
cheek
Barefaced impudence
cheese it
Beat it
cherry smashes
Weak kisses
chestnut
An old joke; the ark was cargoed with them
chewing gum
Doublespeak, or ambiguous talk
chicago lightning
Gunfire
chicago overcoat
Coffin
chicago typewriter

Thompson submachine gun; see chopper
chick

Young woman
chicken
A broiler, flapper, young girl
chilled off
Killed; murdered
chin
Conversation; talking
chin music

Punch on the jaw
chinese squeeze
Grafting by skimming profits off the top
chip in
To contribute money to
chippy
Woman of easy virtue
chisel
Swindle or cheat
chiv
knife; stabbing or cutting weapon
chocolate drop
An African-american
choice bit of calico
Desirable female
chop-suey
Blah, applesauce, nonsense

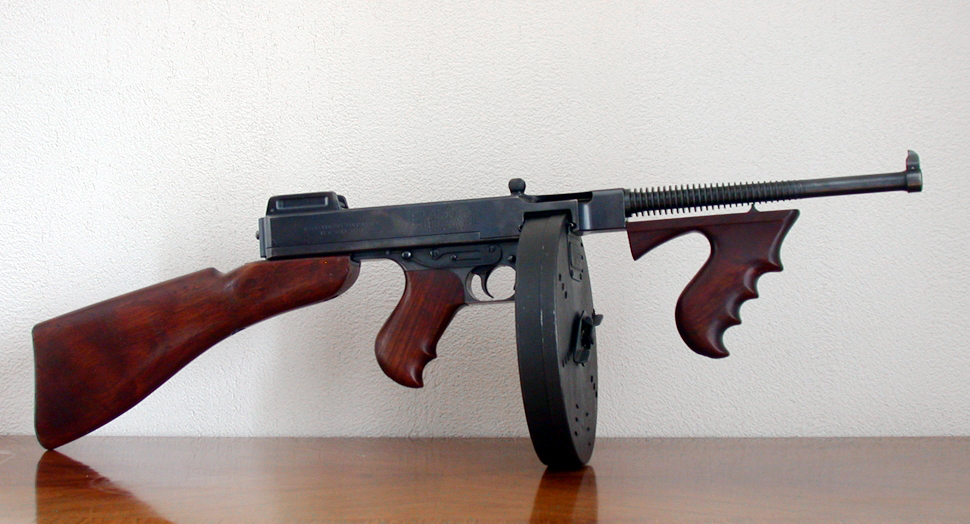
Colt Model 1921A Thompson with a 100-round drum magazine

chopper

Nickname because of the damage its heavy .45 caliber rounds did to the human body; see chicago typewriter
chop squad
A squad of hitmen wielding Thompson submachine guns; also chopper squad
chorine
A chorus girl
chump
1. A blockhead
2. Person marked for a con or a gullible person
ciggy

Cigarette
cinemagoer
Frequently attends motion pictures (1920)
clam
1. Money i.e. One Dollar bills; see ace
2. A dumb or taciturn person
clammed
Close-mouthed e.g. he really clammed up!
claptrap
Cheap unworthy trick to get applause
claret
In pugilistic slang, blood
class, classy
Ritzy, elegant, swell, fashionable
claw-hammer coat
Evening dress coat
clay-eater, dirt-eater
Poor whites who eat clay
clean, to get
To escape entirely
clean sneak
Escape from a robbery with no clues left behind
clip joint

Nightclub where the prices are high and the patrons are fleeced
clipped
1. Shoot dead
2. cheated or fleeced
clodhopper
A country jake, hick, jay, rube, etc
close
Stingy
close your head
Shut up
clothesline
Person who tells neighborhood stories
clout
Shoplifter
cloven foot, to show the
To betray satanic character
clover, to be in
To be well off
clubhouse
Police station

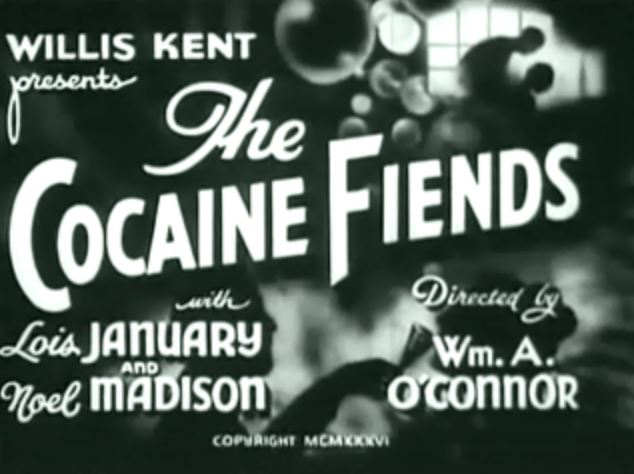
Title card for the American exploitation film The Cocaine Fiends

cocaine fiend
1916, the term "Cocaine Fiend" was fashionable. The term was used in trade journal of the period. However, movie reviewers revised the term to "Cocaine addict" as a replacement phase which seemed a little less harsh to readers

Example
Browne finds a dead woman, whose jewels are missing. Foumier discovers that Browne is a cocaine fiend, and . . .

— 1916 Moving Picture World Review of No. 16 Martin Street

cocked hat, to knock into
To knock out of shape
cocky
Saucy, impertinent
coco, koko
Head, supposititious site of brains
codfish aristocracy
Vulgar new-rich; fish baron
co-ed
Girl or woman at a college for both sexes
coffin varnish
Bootleg liquor, often poisonous
coin
Money; loot

Example
Wanted: Love *** Abe has Coin *** Girls Kid him

— 1915 Article Headline of Abe Deuce's letter to the editor of Los Angeles Record

coin money
To prosper in business
coke

cocaine; cocaine addict
cokehead

Someone who engages in frequent and uncontrollable cocaine consumption

Example
Newspaper article states addicts are nicknamed according to the kind of drug they use e.g.one addicted to cocaine is called a cokehead, coke, snowbird, sniffer.

— 1923 newspaper article explaining drug usage and terms

cold
Distant, frigid, unenthusiastic
cold deck
Marked or stacked deck of cards
cold shoulder
Same as icy mitt; refusal of a lover
cold water, to throw on
To discourage
collar, hot under the
To be angry
come to time
1. The term was employed in prizefighting, specifically boxing
2. The contestants are expected to resume the competition once the rest period is over and time is called
3. Meet expectations; keep an appointment

Example
They Like 'Em Rough,' with Viola Dana. – Comedy-drama in which a husband uses cave man tactics to make his flapper wife come to time

— 1922 Exhibitors Herald Movie Review

come-uppance, to get one's
To get one's deserts
con
Confidence game, swindle
con artist
Person who cheats or tricks others by persuading them to believe something that is not true
con game
Scam in which the victim is persuaded to trust the swindler in some way
confidence game; con-game
A trick for extorting money from the unwary. hence, con-man, etc.
conk
Head
cooler
solitary confinement cell in a prison
coon
In a bad predicament; negro, hence, gone coon
cootie
Louse. hence, cuddle-cootie; an affectionate person
cop

1. Police officer
2. Catch; capture
3. Steal; swipe
copacetic
Wonderful, fine, all right e.g."everything is copacetic"
copped
Catch; Capture: Arrested by the cops
copper
Policeman
corked
Alternate names for intoxicated; see § drunk
corn
Bourbon; corn liquor; rum
corn shredder
Bad dancer i.e. young man who dances on lady's feet
corner the market, to
To monopolize the supply
corridor vamp
Someone who ogles the opposite sex
cotton, to
To stick closely to
couch-beetle
Bedbug, amorous person
country
Hicksville; rustic
court-plaster
A wooer who sticks by you
cow
An awkward waddling woman
cowpie
Automobile; see also bucket crate heap jalopy
cowpie warmup
Car ride
cowpuncher
A cowboy, a he-man
crab
1. Grouch
2. Figure out
crabhanger
Reformer
crack a bottle
Open a bottle of liquor
crack up
To praise highly
crack, a wise
A near-bright remark
crack wise
Make a sarcastic, flippant, or sardonic comment
cracked
Crazy
cracker
Poor white, as in Georgia
crank
A person with a mental twist
crape hanger
Zealous reformer
craps
Dice; African golf; Abyssinian polo; Congo croquet
crap-shooter
One who plays craps; ivory-roller
crasher

Person who attends a party uninvited
crate
Automobile; see also bucket cowpie heap jalopy
crawl, to
To wriggle out of a difficulty obsequiously
creeps
Goose-flesh, cold shivers
croak
To die; to be Killed; murdered
croaker
Doctor
crook
A criminal, dishonest person hence, to crook
crow
To exult in triumph
crush

Have romantic interest; Infatuation
crushed out
Escaped i.e. from jail:Prison break
cub
A young reporter
cuckoo
Crazy
cuddle-cootie
Young man who takes a girl for a ride usually on a bus
cuddler
One who likes to make out
cups, in his
Drunk; spifflicated; stewed, pickled
cur
A contemptible man
curb, on the
Out in the street; said of curbstone brokers, dealing in small securities
cuss
A perverse or obstinate fellow; used affectionately also
cussedness, general
General mischievousness
custard pie comedies
Comedies in which the chief trick is throwing custard pies
cut dead
To snub socially
cut down
Strike down; kill; incapacitate
cutie
A doll, peach, attractive girl
cutie-pie
Typically a young woman who is charming or attractive; also Cutesie pie
cutting yourself a piece of cake
Making yourself wait patiently
cuttroat
A dealer in coal, landlord, etc.

== D ==
d.t.'s
1. Delirium tremens
2. A middle-aged man attentive to a gold-digger
daddy
Young woman's wealthy boyfriend or lover (sugar daddy)
daddy-o
Term of address usually directed towards older males
daisy
1. A person or thing that is charming
2. None too masculine
dame
Female. did not gain widespread use until the 1930's
damper
One or that which depresses
dance
To be hanged
dangle
Leave, get lost
dapper
1. Fashionably attired, impeccably dressed
2. Flapper's dad
darb
Man who pays the check; gink with a roll of coin
dark horse
A candidate unmentioned before election
darkey
Negro, especially the old-fashioned type
daylight
Similar to the idea of "letting the daylight in" or "fill him with daylight" i.e. create a hole by either shooting or stabbing
day, call it a
Let's quit work
daylight, letting through one
Shooting a person
dead ringer for
Exact image of
dead soldier
Empty beer bottle
dead to the world
Unconscious; dead drunk
deadbeat
A sponge, parasite, one who lives on others
deadhead
A deadbeat, especially a theatrical one; one who has not paid for his ticket; empty bottle
deb

Debutant
deck
1. Refers to a single-dose packet, bag, or glassine envelope of cocaine e.g. deck of cocaine
2. Pack of cigarettes e.g. Deck of Luckies

Example
. . .Audrey to get her some coke. Audrey calls Max, the piano player, and he gives her a deck, which Cleo pretends to take

— 1916 Moving Picture Weekly Review of No. 16 Martin Street

declaration Of Independence
Divorce
demi-monde
A woman of questionable reputation
demirep
A woman of doubtful chastity
derrick
Shoplifter
deuce
The devil
devil
A printer's assistant; a gay fellow
dewdropper
Young man who sleeps all day and doesn't have a job
diamond, rough
An unclaimed daddy; a rich man who eats peas with his knife
dib
Share of the proceeds
dick

1. Private investigator coined around 1900, the term finds major recognition in the 20's
2. A policeman, detective
dickens, the
The devil
diff
Difference "what's the diff"
dig in
To work hard
dig out
To leave suddenly
diggings
A mine; a house
dimbox

Taxicab; see Hack
dimbox Jaunt
Taxi ride
dincher
Half smoked cigarette
dingledangler
Person who persists in telephoning
dingus
Thing
dip
Pickpocket
dip the bill
Have a drink
dippy
Unnoodled; bughouse; crazy
dirty linen
Family or political disgraces
dish
1. Pretty woman
2. Provide information to talk
dished
To be cheated out of
ditzek
Anything funny
dive
1. A disreputable resort
2. Disreputable or low quality bar
dive ducat
Subway ticket
dizzy
1. Deeply in love with a woman e.g. Are you dizzy with that dame
2. Stupid; making a bad decision e.g. Don't do that – are you dizzy?
do
To swindle
do the dance
To be hanged
do time
Serve in prison
dodo
Fossil; antiquated specimen
dog
Fellow
dog kennels
Pair of shoes
dog jock
Man who walks his wife's dogs
doggy
Ritzy, swell, stylish
dogs
Feet, shoes
doll
Baby, chicken, peach, attractive woman
dolled up
Dressed up; dressed fit to kill
don't know from nothing
Doesn't have any information
don't take any wooden nickels
Don't do anything stupid; also don't take any wooden dimes
doo-dad
Thing-um-a-bob; what-dye-call-it
dope
A narcotic; hence dope-fiend, dope-joint, the real facts
dope

Any form of illicit drugs
dope fiend
Drug addict usually cocaine or opium
dope peddler
Drug dealer
doublecross

1. Cheat, stab in the back
2. To judas; to betray
dough
Money
dough
Money
doughboy
American soldier in the world war
doughnut
Money all around, nothing in the middle; a rich fool
down and out
Utterly broke
drag a sock
Walk or dance
draw
To pull out one's pistol
dress up
To play up or ornament a story
drift
Go i.e. leave
drill
Shoot
drop a nickel

1. Place a phone call to the police and provide information about someone; Alternative expression – "drop a dime"
2. Actually making a phone call
droppers
Hired killers
dropping the pilot
Getting a divorce
drugstore cowboy
Well-dressed man who loiters in public areas trying to pick up women
drum
Speakeasy
dry

Place where alcohol is not served or person opposed to the legal sale of alcohol
dry Up
Cover up; Keep quiet about; stop talking
dry-gulch
Murder or kill someone
dub
A mutt, a dud, a flat tire, a poor fish
ducat
Ticket
duck lame
A congressman failing reelection and still serving his unexpired term
duck soup
Easy Ticket
ducky
Very good
dud
1. An unexploded shell; a failure; a pepless person
2. Wall flower or dress up
dud up
Dress up
dude
One who follows "what men are wearing" in the theater programs
dude-wrangler
An easterner cowpunching or ranching; a tenderfoot
duds
Belongings; especially, cloths when worn
dumb
Stupid

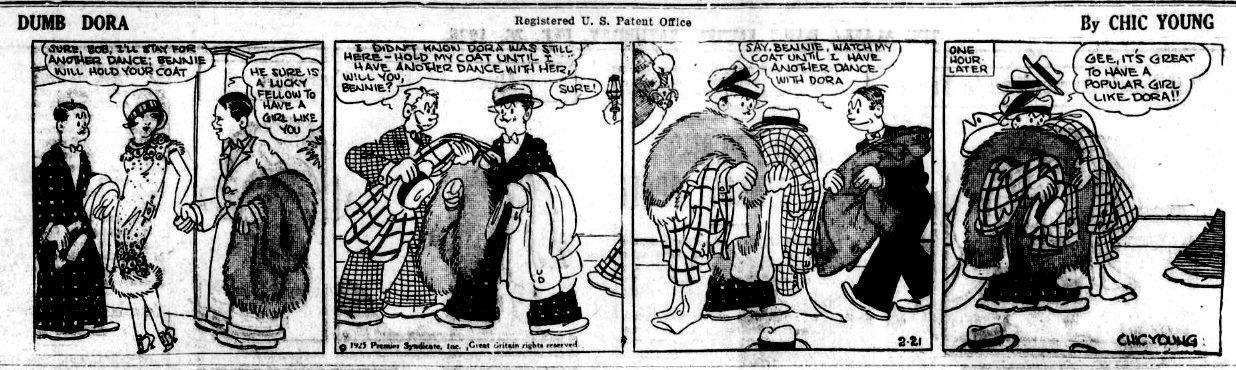
1920s Dumb Dora Comic strip by Chic Young

dumb dora

1. Stupid, especially a woman
2. Foolish woman often applied to a flapper
dummer
1. Thug who robs drunks
2. Thief who robs homes when the occupants are away
dumkuff
Nutty
dump
1. A house; affectionately, as "a swell dump"
2. Roadhouse, club; more generally, any place
dump, to
To get rid of
dust
Money
dust out
Leave, depart
dutch treat
Each pays for his own

== E ==
ear muffs
Radio receivers
earful
Enough
easy mark
Swindle food; one easily tricked
easy virtue
One to whom virtue comes hard
edged
Intoxication, a buzz e.g. When he was edged, his personality completely changed
edisoned
Questioned
egg
1. Person who lives the big life
2. A man, hence, bad egg, hard-boiled egg
egg harbor
Fall dance
eggs in the coffee
Easy
elbows
Cops
electric cure
Electrocution
elegant
Dainty, fastidious
elephant ears
Police officer or detective
elevated
Slightly drunk
embalmed
Intoxicated; see § drunk
embalmer
Bootlegger
ethel
Effeminate man; male homosexual
evil
Anything pleasant
ex
Out of a job; as, ex-president, ex-bartender
eye, black
A mark to one's discredit
eye, my!
Expletive of surprise
eye opener
Marriage

== F ==
face, close your
Close your mouth
face stretcher
Older woman trying to look younger
fade
Go away, get lost
fag

Cigarette
fagot

1. A chorus man; an effeminate man
2. Sometime around 1920, the term meant a homosexual
fairy
An effeminate man
fake
Anything prepared for deceiving
fakeloo artist
Con man
faker
A street merchant, as of cheap jewelry; a college economist or sociologist; a statesman or patriot, preacher or doctor; a man
fall for
To be gullible; to fall in love
fall guy

1. Victim of a frame
2. One who tries to sell gold bricks; one who takes the blame, while his accomplices escape
fan
An enthusiast over some sport; from fanatic; to club (police term)
fancy man
A women's preferred lover
fathead
Nincompoop; dumb bell
father of Waters
The Mississippi
father time
Any man over 30
favorite son
Politicians popular at home, but a zero elsewhere
feathers
Small talk
fed up
Surfeited
feed the fishes
To be seasick; to be drowned
feed the press
To rush copy to press
feeler
An experimental suggestion; fingers or hand
feet
Clumsy dancer
fella
Man, Guy, Fellow e.g. That john sure is a swell fella; see also bo buster mac pal
fence
A receiver of stolen goods
fence, on the
Undetermined
fetching
Pleasing
few, a
A good many
few drinks, a
Common euphemism for drinking an unspecified amount of alcohol usually in the context of attending a Speakeasy
fiddle-de-dee
Nonsense, applesauce, a case of tut-tut
fiddlesticks
Nonsense, how absurd!
fifty-fifty
Half and half
fig leaf
One piece bathing suit
fight
A party; as, a tea-fight. hence, hen fight, woman's party
filches
Steal or pilfer someone's possession, especially if it's something small

Example
After his arrival, Dippy filches many of the guests of their valuables

— 1922 Exhibitors Herald Movie Review

filibuster
A strategic move in congress, to delay a bill or prevent passage
fin
$5 bill and abe's cabe
finale hopper
1. Young man who arrives after all bills are paid
2. Always eager to make empty promises and never present when it matters
3. One who sticks to the last dance
findings
Accessories; needles, pins, etc. in dressmaking
finder
The individual responsible for detonating the safe as part of a safe blowing crew; see yegg
finger
Identify or direct someone, especially to a professional killer; Put the finger on or to finger someone
finger man
finger man, snitch, inside person
fink

Informant; stool pigeon
fire alarm
Divorced woman
fire bell
Married woman
fire extinguisher
Chaperone at a dance or party
fish
1. First timer in prison i.e. a new fish
2. Heavy drinker e.g. You drink like a fish
fish, poor
Pepless creature
fish-story
A lie; a cherry-tree tale
fix
A mess
fizzle
A failure
flabbergast
To astound or stagger
flame
One's beloved
flaming youth
In the 1920s, the term referred to a group of young men known for their wild and flamboyant behavior; Male counterpart to a flapper; see cake eater

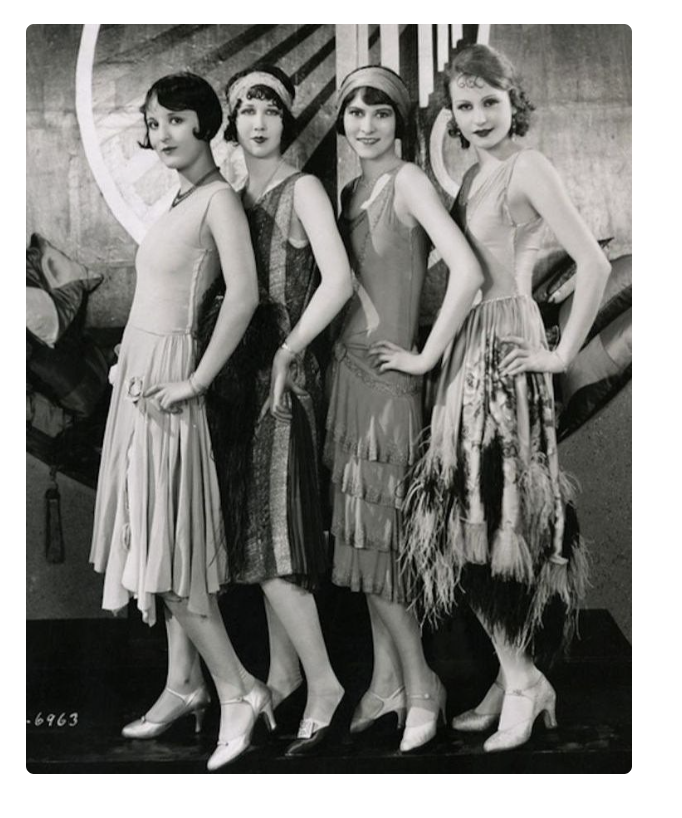
Young flappers, members of the 1927 MGM Chorus Girls

flapdoodle
Twaddle; nonsense
flapper(s)

1. Unconventional young woman, often from a middle-class background, typically in her late teens or early twenties, defied her parents' wishes by embracing a bold, unconventional lifestyle with short bobbed hair, revealing outfits, lipstick, and a free-spirited attitude; Flappers are associated with the Jazz Age of the 1920s
2. God's masterpiece, or nature's; the modern bobbed-haired heart-bandit

Example
They Like 'Em Rough,' with Viola Dana – Comedy-drama in which a husband uses cave man tactics to make his flapper wife come to time

— 1922 Exhibitors Herald Movie Review

flat
Broke
flatfoot
Policeman esp officer who walks a beat
flat shoe
Dispute between flapper and her goof
flat tire
1. Dull insipid, disappointing date; see Drag, Oilcan, Pickle, Pill, Rag
2. A dud; a vim less person
flattie
Flatfoot, cop
flatwheeler
Young man who takes a young lady to an egg harbor
flier
A small investment, in stocks, as a gamble
flimflam

To cheat or swindle, as by trickery
fling
A sneer
flip a coin
Toss a coin to decide a matter
flippers
Hands
flirt with death or the undertaker
Run a big risk

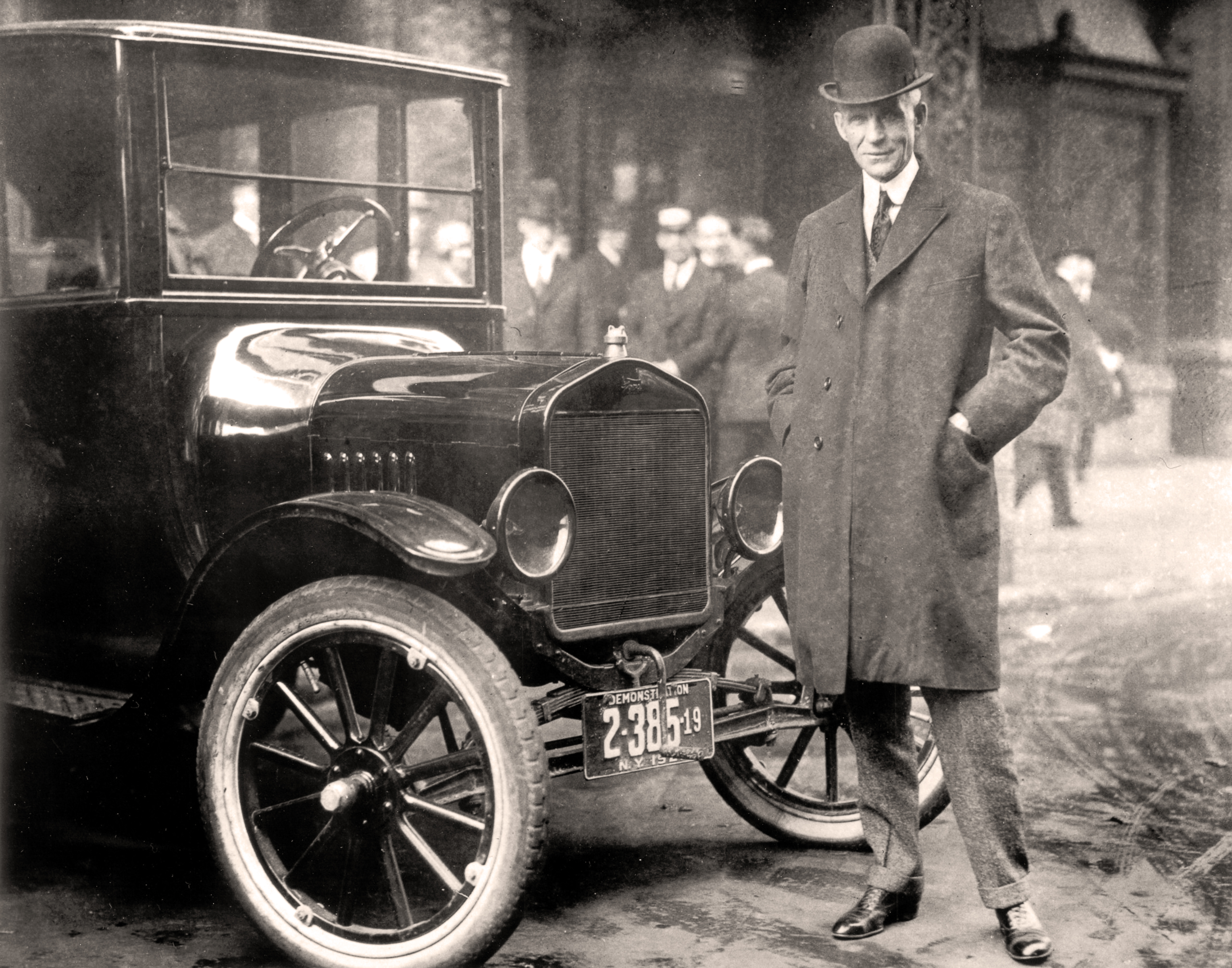
Henry Ford standing in front of a 1921 Model T

flivver
1. Ford model T
2. After 1928, could mean broken down car
3. A ford, tin lizard, tin lizzie, etc.
floater
1. Person making trouble and then disappears
2. A fraudulent voter
flogger
Overcoat
flooey, to go
To flop, be spoiled
floorflusher
Insatiable dancer
flop
1. Go to bed; fall asleep
2. Grown-up who is disagreeable, socially awkward, and unsuccessful; 1920s
3. Intentionally lose a fight by taking a dive; 1920s
4. Woman who is fat, clumsy, and lacks cleanliness; 1900-1930s
5. Cheap room in hotel or bed; 1910s
6. Abrupt change in political policy
7. Seat
8. Hit; knock down; 1910s
9. A failure
flophouse

Cheap transient hotel used by people down on their luck
flossy
Ritzy, swell, classy, elegant
flour lover
Girl with too much face powder
flu
The influenza or grippe
fluke
An accidental lucky stroke
fluky
Odd; Different
flumadiddle
Humbug; flummery; nonsense
flunk
To fail
flunkey
A servant in livery
flush
Affluent; well monied; sugar-coated
fluzie
A daughter of joy, a prostitute
fly boy

Glamorous term for an aviator
fly-by-night
A shady enterprise or person
fly-up-the-creek
A capricious person
fodder
Food
fog
Attack; Assault; Shoot
fogy
Old-fashioned eccentric
foot juice
Cheap red wine
foozle
A poorly played stroke
for a row of
Distance
for crying out loud
Another way of saying – are you for real?
forty, all Like everything
Like everything
forty-niner
Man who is prospecting for a rich wife
fossil
A dodo, mossback, antiquated person
four flusher

1. Person who feigns wealth while mooching off others
2. A bluff; one who bets on four cards instead of five of a suit
fox
To fool, cheat, play a joke on
foxy
Cunning
frail
Woman
frame
Giving false evidence to set up someone
frau

Wife
free lance
A writer writing without advance assignment
free-for-all
A general fight; a battle royal
freebie
This offer can be used for a free sample or promotion; Also spelled freebie, freeby, freebee freebye
freeze on to
Take a tight hold of
freeze out
To compel to retire or withdraw
french leave
Omitted or informal leave-taking
fresh
Presumptuous; bold; cheeky
freshman
A first year man in college
fried
Alternate names for intoxicated e.g. fried to the hat; see § drunk
frills
Fancy accompaniments
frisk
To search a person by going through his pockets
fritz, on the
No good
frog's eyebrows
Nice; fine; outstanding
frosh
a freshman
fry

To be electrocuted
fry, small
Persons of no importance
frump
A sour old maid; a prim old lady
fuddled
Muddled; intoxicated
fudge
Nonsense; to cheat (marbles); a kind of candy
full
Drunk
full of prunes
you're crazy; you're wrong
funk
Fear; panic
fuss
To confuse; also, to escort a girl
futz
Euphemism for f*%k e.g. Don't futz around
fuzz

Police officers(1930s)

== G ==
g man

Government man; FBI employee
gabby
A simpleton
gad, gadabout
One always visiting
gag
A joke, hoax; an interpolated line in a play
gal
Woman assistant, secretary; female factotum
gall
Confidence, audacity, assurance
gall-nipper
A large mosquito
gallivant
To play the gallant to the opposite sex
gallows-bird
An abandoned criminal
gallowses, galluses
Suspenders
galoot
An awkward person
game
A trick a deceitful method
game, to be
To be a good sport, willing to take a chance hence, die game
gams
Woman's legs
gander
1. Dressing up; Getting ready and duding up
2. Look, close scrutiny, glance e.g. Take a gander at those gams
3. Criminal lookout
gandy dancer

A member of a crew responsible for attaching rails to ties, often called a section hand or track laborer
gang
A group of persons for any purpose
gangster
Member of a criminal gang
garret
The head. garrets, empty at first, are used to store worthless trifles of nonsense
gas
Vain or boastful talk
gas-house district
District in city unsuitable for living; abode of gangsters
gas station

Place that sells gasoline; term was coined in 1925
gasper

Cigarette
gat

Pistol, Hand gun; see roscoe
gatecrasher

Attending party, type of entertainment without an invitation or ticket i.e. uninvited guest; see crasher
gawk
A simpleton of either sex
gay

1. Happy or lively Happy, joyful, and lively
2. No connection to homosexuality in 1920
gay woman, a
One happy; one unchaste
geezer, old
Antique bozo; a dodo; an old dud
gentle sex
Satirically applied to women
get-hot!
Encouragement for a hot dancer
get a wiggle On
Get a move on, get going
get in a lather
Get worked up; angry; agitated e.g. Stay away from Eddy when he gets into a lather
get sore
Get mad; angry
getaway
An escape
getaway sticks
Women's Legs; see gams
get it
Killed; Murdered
get pinched
to be arrested
get-up
Outfit
gibble-gabble, mulligatawny
Foolish talk
giddy
Wanton, flighty
giggle water

Intoxicating beverage; alcohol; also Giggle Juice
gigolo

Hired escort or dancing partner for a woman
gills, pickled to the
Soused; drunk
gilt-edged
Of the highest grade; as, gilt-edged Nordic Rotarian virginity
gimcrack
A showy, useless trifle
gimp
Cripple i.e. One who walks with a limp; Gangster Dion O'Bannion was called gimpy due to his noticeable limp
gimlet
Chronic bore
gin mill
Seller of hard liquor; Cheap speakeasy
gink
1. Man or fellow
2. A person
girlie
A shemale, a girl
give 'em the gate
Bounce, reject
give the air
Break a date
give the knee
Dance cheek-to-cheek and Toe-to-Toe
gizzard
Guts; pluck; one's insides
glad rags
Clothing to 'go out on the town; Attire to wear to parties or special occasions
glom
The act of stealing; also glaum
glorious fourth
Independence day, July 4, 1776; still fourth - try and see how independent
glorious regalia
Chic clothing of a flapper
go chase yourself
Get lost; Scram
gold digger

Woman who associates or marries a man for his wealth (1915)
go getter
A hustler for business
go to it
Go ahead
go to the bad
Become evil
go to the wall
Fail, as in business
go, a pretty, a rum go, etc
A turn of affairs
go, on the
Continually going to parties
goat, get one's
To fuss or disconcert one
goat, to ride the
To be initiated into a secret order
gob
Sailor in the united states navy
go-by, give the
Reject
god
One who sits in the top gallery of a theater; a deity
god's footstool
The earth (but see contrary opinion "protest by Florida chambers of commerce")
gold digger
A jewel coaxer; a vamp; a girl or woman who accepts a man's attention for the sake of his gifts
goner
Past recovery; utterly doomed
gonof, gonoph
Pickpocket; expert thief
good night!
You don't say so! an expletive
goods, The
1. Incrimination evidence, the facts, the truth, e.g. make sure the cops don't get the goods on you
2. Narcotics of any sort
3. The thing bargained for; a fine thing, or person
goof
1. Bumbling, stupid person
2. Flapper's boyfriend
goofus
Dumbbell; silly person
goofy
1. Crazy, Silly, foolish
2. In love
goog
Black eye inflicted by a blow to the head
goon

strong imitating man; compensated troublemaker
goose-egg
The figure 0, naught
gooseberry lay
Stealing clothes from a clothesline
gospel
Anything received as true
gouge
To extort excessive profits in industry
gowed-up
High on dope
goy
One not a jew
grab-game
Rapacious procedure in politics,
grab a flop
Sit down on a seat
grab some air
Put your hands up
graft
1. Obtaining money through dishonest means, especially bribery
2. Illegal profit through political pull. hence, grafter
grand

One thousand dollars; $1000
grass-widow
Woman divorced or abandoned by her husband
greaser
A Mexican
great unwashed
The rabble
green apples
Homely woman
green glorious
Money and checks
green, long
Money, greenbacks
green-goods
Counterfeit money. hence greengoods-man
greenhorn
An inexperienced person
greenland
A park
grift

Confidence game or swindle; also grifter i.e. Con man
grill(ed)
1. Interrogation; intense and prolonged questioning
2. To cross-examine
grindhouse(s)

1. Low-budget film theater that shows primarily exploitation films i.e. Term first appeared in 1920s and derived from burlesque theaters on 42nd Street in New York City; Origins based on early projectionists used a grinding or cranking motion
2. "According to historian David Church, this theater type was named after the "grind policy", a film-programming strategy dating back to the early 1920s that continuously showed films at cut-rate ticket prices that typically rose over the course of each day."

Example
Flyers made from San Francisco to Hawaii. It is just a hoak meller that will, for the better part, carry in some of the smaller grindhouses.

— 1926 Variety Movie Review

gringo
A foreigner; one who cannot speak Spanish
grubstake
1. To supply with food and necessities, in return for a share of profits; such supplies
2. Invitation to dinner
grubber
One who borrows cigarettes
grummy
Depressed
grundy, mrs
Middle-class propriety
grungy
Envious
gum
Opium
gumshoe

Detective or private investigator; also gumshoeing i.e. pertaining to an undercover investigation
gun for
Searching for someone with the intention of causing them significant harm. e.g. He was out gunning for Tom
guns
Pickpockets; Hoodlums
gunman
Hired assassin; soldier
gush
Extravagant talk or display of affection
gussie
Shy person
guts
Pluck
guy
A gender-neutral way to address any individual (1910)

== H ==
hack
1. Taxicab
2. One to be had for hire; as, a hack-writer
hair of the dog

Taking shot of booze to help recover from a hangover especially the day after going on a Toot; also The hair of the dog that bit you
half
Fifty-cents; 50 cents i.e. $.50
half-baked
Simple minded
half-cocked
To go off hastily
half cut
Happily intoxicated
half seas over
Alternate names for intoxicated; see § drunk
half under
Alternate names for intoxicated; see § drunk
ham actor
A poor actor
hand, give 'em a
Give them applause
handcuff
Engagement ring or wedding band
handle
Title, name
hank
Handkerchief
happy
Drunk and merry
happy-dust
Cocaine
hard
Tough; see also bimbo hard-boiled Bruno
hard-boiled

1. Tough i.e. tough guy, e.g. "He sure is hard-boiled!"; see also bimbo Bruno
2. Sophisticated; cruel
hard up
Broke, impoverished
harlem sunset
Fatal injury caused by knife (1930s)
harp
Irishman
has-been
One whose best days are over
hash-house
1. Cheap boarding house
2. Cheap restaurant
hash-slinger
Waitress in a hash house
hatchet man
Killers, gunmen
have the bees
To be rich
have kittens
1. Expressing intense and unexpected emotions; see cast a kitten
2. Experience a sudden outburst of laughter, fear, or anger e.g. "He got so upset, I thought he was going to have kittens"
hay, hit the
Go to sleep
hayburner
1. Gas guzzling car i.e. automobile that uses a lot of fuel and gets poor gas mileage
2. Race Horse one loses money on
3. Someone who smokes marijuana
hayseed
Rustic, hick
head over heels
Entirely; as, in love
head, swelled
Conceited
heart, have a
Take pity; go easy
heartwrenching
Appealing to one's deepest emotions or inner feelings; Tug at one's heartstrings; also heart-tugging
heavens
Formerly, god's residence; now "you don't say so," an expletive
head doctors
Psychiatrists
heap
Old automobile; see also bucket, cowpie, crate, jalopy
heat
1. The police
2. Pursuit by law enforcement
heater
Gun, pistol, revolver; see gat; see roscoe
heavy sugar
Indicator of wealth through possession or condition

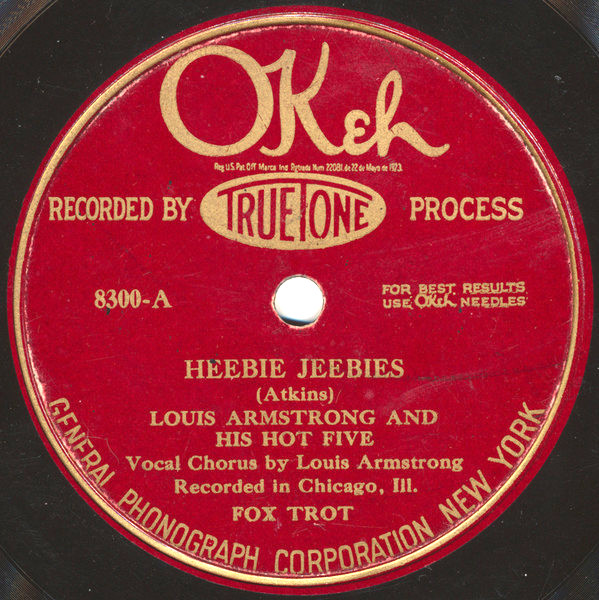
1926 single by Louis Armstrong and His Hot Five

heebie-jeebies

The state of being extremely nervous caused by fear, worry, stress, etc; named after the 1926 single by Louis Armstrong and His Hot Five – hit song
heeler
1. A political follower; ward-heeler
2. Poor dancer
he-man
Western, man with hair on chest
hen
A woman
hen coup
Beauty parlor
hep
1. Wise; up-to-date
2. Jazz musician
het up
Excited, angry
hick
Countryman
high flier, high roller, high stepper
A sport; fast liver
high hat
1. Haughty, Snobbish, Unapproachable
2. Up stage
high horse, on the
Supercilious
high pillow
Person at the top; Individual in charge; the boss
highbrow

Intellectually stimulating, highly cultured, sophisticated, cultured or learned person
highfalutin'
High flown manner or speech
highjack
To rob from a thief or bootlegger
highjohn
Boyfriend
highbinders
Corrupt politician or functionary; highly pretentious, arrogant
hike
Walk
hikers
Knickerbockers
hinges, off one's
Crazy
hinky
Suspicious; curious
hiphound
One who drinks hooch
hipster
1. During Prohibition – person who wears a hip flask of alcohol dating from the 1920s
2. A dancer, particularly a female one
3. One who espouses the bohemian life style of the period
his blue serge
His girl
histrionics

Intentionally exaggerated, overly emotional behavior designed to provoke a response
hit
A successful play; any success
hit on all sixes
To perform 100 per cent e.g. "hitting on all six cylinders"; also hitting on all cylinders
hitch
A period of time spent in prison or jail
hitting on all eight
In good shape, going well
hitting the pipe
Smoking opium
hoary-eyed
Alternate names for intoxicated; see § drunk
hobo
Shiftless worker or tramp
hock
To pawn
hock shop
Pawnshop
hogs
Engines
hoaky
1. Excessively contrived; Hackneyed; also hoakier, hoakiest, hoak
2. Sentimental material in a film; alt spelling of hokey; see hokum

Example
flyers made from San Francisco to Hawaii. It is just a hoak meller that will, for the better part, carry in some of the smaller grindhouses.

— 1926 Variety Movie Review

hoity-toity
Behaviour adopted to demonstrate one's superiority; Pretentious or snobbish behaviour
hokum

1. An instance of excessively contrived, hackneyed, or sentimental material in a film
2. Pretentious; nonsense; insane trash
3. Bunk; trick of actor, politician or clergyman to get applause

Example
. . . where Nazimova comes to a house of refuge, not knowing that Sills is there, and is pronounced dying by physicians, but is saved by Sills' prayer. To us who make and sell pictures, this "saved by prayer" situation registers as hokum, but just the same it has a genuine wallop for most of your customers, and consequently this final sequence effectively tops a very good red meat dramatic yarn.

— 1924 Wid's Movie Review

holaholy
Person that objects to necking
holy smokes
Probation officer
home, nobody
Crazy
home-brew
Liquor, malt or otherwise, made at home
hombre

Man or fellow
honest indian or injun
In very truth
honest squeeze
Female companion or girlfriend;see squeeze
honey
Sweetheart, darling
honor, a nation's
Any alleged cause of war
hooch

Alcoholic drink made by Alaskan Indians (Hoochinoo), but more commonly refers to illicitly distilled liquor
hood

Hoodlum
hoodlum
A rowdy, rough, larrikin, street loafer
hooey
Nonsense; Bullsh*t; Popular from 1925 through 1930 and used sparingly later on
hoof
Walk
hoof it
Walk it, beat it, depart
hoofer

Dancer or chorus girl
hook
To swipe or steal
hook, get the, or give him the
Remove him; he's punk
hooligan
Tramp
hoosegow

Jail
hootch
Contraband alcoholic beverage, homebrew
hop

1. Type of swing dance e.g. Lindy Hop; organized dance (1900s)
2. Opiate, marijuana, morphine or other type of narcotics
hophead

Morphine addict
hope chest
Pack of cigarettes
hopped up
Under the influence of drugs
hopper

Dancer
horn in
Get into a dance without an invitation
horse, a
A joke at one's expense
horsefeathers
Exclamation of disbelief contempt; Inoffensive expletive e.g. darn; see Applesauce
hot
Stolen; Recently stolen illegal goods
hot as they make 'em
Reckless, careless
hot dawg
Great!
hot sketch
Card or cut-up
hotdog
1. A sausage supposed to be half beef and half pork. also an expletive, like "oh boy!"
2. Relishing something with much delight!
hotsy-totsy, tootsie-wootsie
1. A girl all to the mustard, all ok
2. Fancy or sophisticated
hound, ( as in booze-hound, smut-hound, etc,)
One fond of a thing
house dick
Security officer employed by a hotel or similar establishment; hotel detective
houdini
Arrive on time for a date
house, disorderly
A prostitution house, especially an orderly one
house of call
Bawdy house with women living outside
house of representatives
Lower house of congress, supposed to represent those they represent
house peeper
House or hotel detective
hub, the
Boston
huff, to take
To take offense
hugger-mugger
Secret, sly, underhand
hum, make things
To do with energy
humbug
To impose upon; a fake, cheat, sham
hump, to have the
To be despondent
hunky
A laborer (from Hungarian)
hunkydory
Satisfactory, all right
hush-money
1. A bribe to prevent disclosure of some disgrace
2. Allowance from father
hustle
To be quick
hustler
A go-getter
hype
Shortchange artist

== I ==
i.o.u.
Acknowledgement of a debt
ice
1. Diamonds e.g. That gal has more ice than the North Pole!
2. Kill e.g. "That mug better be careful or he's gonna get iced!"
ice, on
In reserve
icy mitt
When you have one-sided feelings for someone or when one is given the cold shoulder in a romantic relationships
idler(s)
A person who wastes time doing nothing; lazy person; sluggard

Example
In the park awaiting her train home she meets Forrest Chenoworth, a rich idler, whose money has gotten him into trouble with a lady named Jane.

— 1920 Wid's Daily Movie Review

illuminated
Lit, drunk
in for it
Committed to a course
in with
Friendly with
indian file
Single file
indian giver
One who takes back a gift
indian hay
Marijuana
in stir
In jail
ing-bing
As in to throw a fit
ins and outs
Details or ramifications
ins, the
The party in power
inside track
Point or place of vantage, "a short cut to success"
inspired
Editorial tone or policy, from a source outside the paper's own ship or management
insured
Engaged
irish confetti
Bricks
irish goodbye(s)

Ethnophobic term used for someone who leaves a social gathering without saying goodbye; also Irish exit
irish up, to get one's
To lose one's temper
iron
1. Motorcycle, among motorcycle enthusiasts 1920s
2. Older automobile
3. Handcuffs
4. Carry iron i.e. armed
iron men
Dollars, money
iron your shoelaces
Go to the restroom e.g. It's time for me to iron my shoelaces
ish kabibble, ish ka bibble
1. Retort e.g. I should care from the name of the musician in the Kay Kyser Orchestra
2. "I should worry," "I should be embarrassed

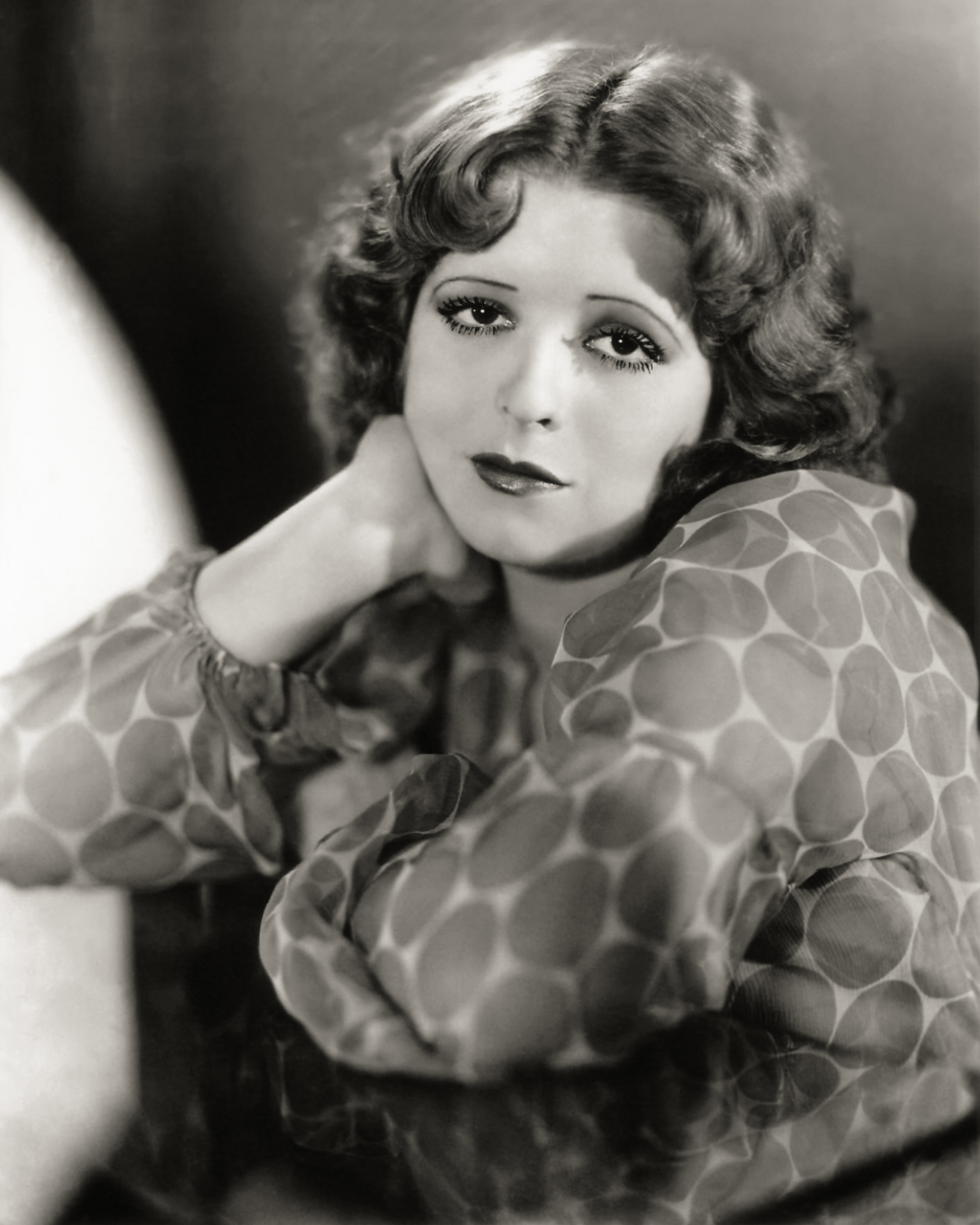
Clara Bow the "it" girl in 1932

it

Sex appeal; Actress Clara Bow was the "It" girl
it's the bunk
I doubt that!
ivories
The teeth; dice; piano keys;· billiard balls
izzum-wizzum
Hotsy-totsy; red-hot sweetie

== J ==
jabber
Chatter, unintelligible speech
jack
Money; a sailor
jackass
Stupid person, blunderhead; a democrat
jack-leg lawyer
A pettifogging lawyer; shyster
jackpot
A corruption fund
jag
State of intoxication, a load of drink
jagamaree
Something for which there is no other name, or whose name is momentarily forgotten; a thingumabob, thingumajig, what dye-call-it, jiggambob, digallium, whoozis
jailbird
One confined in jail; a criminal
jake
Great, e.g. Everything's jake; see Copacetic
jakes
A comfort station, privy

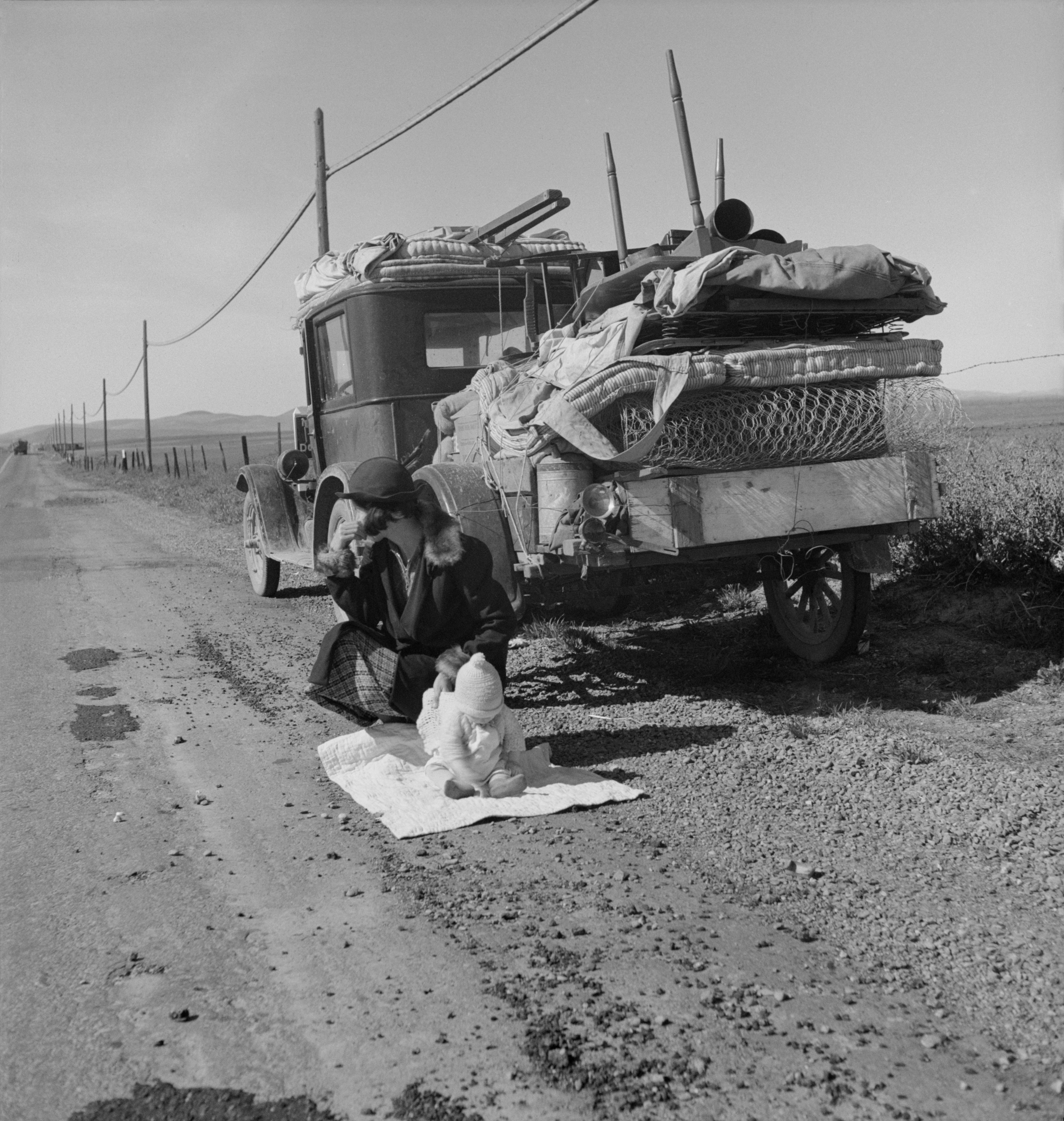
Dorothea Lange's photo of a Missouri family of five

jalopy

Dumpy old car; see also bucket cowpie crate heap
jam
Trouble; Tight spot
jamboree
Spree, carousal, frolic
jane

Female; a dame; woman, girl
jasper
Man; hick
jawbreaker
A word hard to pronounce
jay
A countryman, boob, greenhorn, rustic, bumpkin, yap, rube, Reuben, hick, gopher prairie dog
jay bird
Person who takes risks
jay-town
A country town inhabited by jays
jay-walking
Cutting corners; crossing streets cater-cornered or midway of the block
java

Coffee
jaw
Talk
jazz
Modern ragtime music; pep
jazz-baby
A cuddly cutie strong for a jazz life
jazz-hound
A male jazz-baby

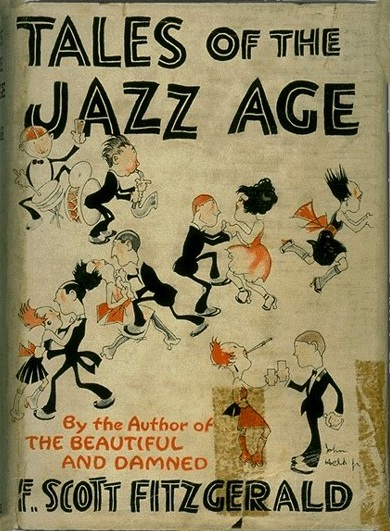
Cover from a 1922 edition of F. Scott Fitzgerald's book Tales of the Jazz Age

jazzman

Performer of jazz

Example
"His thousands of admirers are happy to know that no anti-toxin has yet been discovered to cure this master jazzman of his 'illness!'"

— 1926 newspaper article praising band leader Fred Hamm

jeepers creepers
1. Polite expletive for Jesus Christ
2. Exclamation!
jericho, ( to send one to)
Hell or Hoboken
jerkwater
Very rustic; as, jerkwater town
jezebel
Painted harlot. in rotary, Baptist, and methodist eyes, a woman who ( 1) dances, (2) smokes, or (3) goes to the theater
jiff, jiffy
An instant of time
jigaboo

Derogatory term for African-American (1920s)
jigger, not worth a
Worthless
jigger, old
Lively old codger, able to jig
jiggered, well I'll be
Exclamation of astonishment
jim jams
Peculiarities; delirium tremens
jim-crow car
Street car or railway car where whites are segregated from negroes. hence, Jim-crow caws, hotels, etc
jim-dandy
Fine as silk; very good
jimmy or jemmy
A burglar's implement, similar to a crowbar
jingle-brained
1. Addled or intoxicated (1910)
2. Not that bright, muddled
jingo
A sanguinary war-promoter; address in wartime; as far behind the trenches as possible
jitney

1. Car employed as a private bus i.e. travel by bus or small car
2. Bus charging a fixed fare usually five-cents i.e. "Nickel"
3. A small coin, a nickel. hence, jitney bus, Jit.
jizzie
An unattractive or antique dame
job, to
To swindle
jobbery
Political graft or swindling
jobbie
Man or woman
jockey
To maneuver for favorable position
joe

Coffee, e.g. A cup of Joe
joe brooks
Perfectly dressed person
john

1. Prostitute's client
2. Toilet or restroom
john bull
A red-nosed gentleman farmer, personifying England
john d
Individuals who use an abundance of polite language and insincere compliments
johnson brother
Professional Criminal
joint
1. Establishment, bar, tavern or club selling alcohol
2. Place e.g. My Joint
3. A meeting place; a naughty resort
joker
An innocent-looking clause slipped into a law to defeat its purpose, or permit an outside trick
jolly, to
To spoof, make fun of
jonah
One who brings bad luck
jorum of skee
Drink of hard liquor usually scotch whiskey; see skee
josh to
To spoof, jolly, cajole, tease, banter
joy-ride
A wild auto party, often in a stolen car
jug

Jail
jugful, not by a
Not by a good deal
juice
Money from bribery, corruption, or loan sharking
juice joint

Establishment for serving illegal liquor during prohibition
jump a claim
To take land illegally
jump at
To grasp eagerly at
junk

Opium or Morphine
jump the gun
Act prematurely
jumping tintypes
Moving pictures
junk head
Morphine addict
junkie

Drug addict, especially a heroin user (1923)
junket
A picnic, feast, excursion-on; a political tour of inspection at public expense. see wine, women and song.
jury-fixer
One who bribes jurymen, openly or subtly
justice
Slang for what is obtained in legal courts

== K ==
kale
Money
keep it dark
Hold it secret
keep one's eye peeled
Watch out
kettle of fish, a nice
Ironic for an annoying situation
keen
Something or someone attractive or appealing
kibitzer
Bystander at a game, bystanding critic
kibosh, on the
On the blink or fritz; spoiled
kick
Pleasure, enjoyment, thrill, alcoholic content
kick in
Contribute your share; pay up
kick off
Die
kick the bucket, kick out
To die
kicker
One who kicks, protests, rebels
kicking the stem
smoking opium
kid, to
To joke or deceive
kiddo
A casual way for a man to address a woman he knows
kiddy
A child
kill, dresserl to
Dressed bewitchingly
killing
Overwhelming, bewitching; an overwhelming profit
killjoy
Solemn person
kike

Derogatory label for Jewish people, specifically those who immigrated from Eastern Europe as opposed to older German immigrants from previous decades
kind of, kind a, kinder
Rather, somewhat
kink
King
kippy
Neat or Nice
kiss
1. Land a blow or punch
2. Drink from a bottle
kiss the dust
Be overthrown
kisser

Mouth
kitten
Woman
kitty
Pot or pool, in cards, to which all contribute
kiyoodle
Dog
knee high to a grasshopper
Low in height
kneeduster
Skirt
knife
To attack in politics secretly
knock
1. To talk against a thing
2. Prison sentence
knock off
1. Stolen
2. Killed, murdered
3. Beaten, defeated
4. To quit work; kill
knock out, k.o.
To win by knocking pugilistic opponent unconscious; a complete success in anything
knock the spots off of
To excel
knock the stuffing out of
To put out of commission, beat up
knock up
Make a woman pregnant; impregnate
knock up against
Meet accidentally
knockabout
Fit for rough wear, as a knock about suit. a slapstick comedian. a roustabout, man of all work
knocker
Habitual faultfinder
knockover
1. Murder, kill
2. Rob or steal with violence
3. Arrest especially after a raid
4. Intentionally get someone in trouble
know, in the
To be hep, to understand
know; the ropes, to
To be acquainted with the workings
know your onions
1. Know one's stuff e.g. Joe really knows his onions when it comes to cooking
2. Knowledgeable about a given subject or task; also know one's onions; knowing one's onions; knew one's onions; known one's onions
knuckle down to
To apply oneself to energetically
knuckle uncler
To submit
kosher
Permitted by or fulfilling the requirements of mosaic law; said usually of food, opposed to "tref"
kowtow, kotow
Make obeisance to
kudos
Glory, honor, renown, publicity; opposed to the cash

== L ==
lalapazaza
Good sport
lady
Any woman, in her own opinion, elevated in such usages as wash lady, lady laundress, lady of easy virtue
lady-killer
A man supposed to fascinate women; sheik
lady-love
Sweetheart
lallypaloozer
A wow, knockout; also, a falsehood
lam, lambaste
To beat, thrash, trounce, drub
lam, on the

On the run
lamb
One who gets fleeced, as in dealing with stocks
lammed off
Ran away or escaped
lamp
To see or notice
lamp, lamps
The eyes
land
To deliver ·or land home a blow
landslide
An overwhelming victory, as in politics
large

$1,000 e.g.Twenty large would be $20,000
large, at
In general; as, a congressman at large. many still are. also, uncaught, fugitive from justice
lark
Spree, frolicsome adventure
larrup
Beat, thrash, rope-end, flog
late unpleasantness
The last war; long used of the civil war; in the future, will be used of the most recent war
laugh, to get the laugh on
Make the object of ridicule
law, the
Police officer
lay, to lay for
Post oneself to do something to one
lay off
Smoke of opium
lay out
1. Defeat or overcome i.e. to lay out someone
2. Knock someone out in a fight
3. Kill someone
Laying on the hip
smoking opium
lead
Term used for bullets e.g. Fill ya full of lead
lead cocktail

To be shot; Bullets, specifically when embedded in the victim's body; also poisoning
lead poisoning

To be shot; Bullets, specifically when embedded in the victim's body; also lead cocktail
lead pusher
gun; gat
leak
Unintended revelation of official secrets, usually scandalous
leave off, lay off
Quit
leech
Parasite, blood-sucker; pawn-broker; land lord; capitalist
left holding The Bag
Leave someone holding the responsibility or blame is to abandon them
leg, shake a
Dance; hurry up
legs, on one's last
Dying
legs, stretch your
Beat it, depart
legs, to get on one's hind
To get angry
leg-show
Refined dancing and near-singing girlie show, patronized by successful bald heads. tights and other clothing were once worn in these
lemon
Dud, flat tire, especially female
lens louise
The person who dominated all the conversations
let daylight into
To expose to the light
let george do it
Work evading phrase i.e.Let someone else cover the cost of achieving the shared benefit
let her go, let her rip
Let it continue.
let on
To pretend
let's blouse
Work evading phrase e.g.Let's blouse this clambake!
lettuce
Green folding money i.e. lettuce leaves
level, on the
On the square, honest and aboveboard
level with me
Be honest, trustworth, true
lick
To beat or thrash
lick and, a promise
A slovenly bit of work
lick the dust
To be defeated
lickspittle
Toady, sycophant
lid
Hat
lie down
To give up, shirk, soldier on the job
lie low
To lie concealed
life-preserver
Pocket flask
light-fingered
Thievish
light-weight
One below the mental or moral average
limb
An impish child; in Baptist circles, a leg
limb of the law
Policeman or lawyer
limey

1. Englishman, Briton, or person of British descent; an English or British immigrant
2. English or British ship
line
1. Untruth or exaggeration, often told to seek or maintain approval from others e.g. "to feed one a line"
2. Insincere flattery
3. A calling, stock of goods carried
line, get into
To adopt the same course as others, or persuade one to.
lines, hard
Bad luck
lingo
Language, language hard to understand
lion
A celebrity, headliner
lioness
A she-celebrity; a woman of note
lionizing
Treating one as if he were a celebrity
lip
1. Underworld attorney i.e. criminal attorney e.g. Why don't you use Louie the Lip?
2. backtalk
3. Impudent or saucy speech. "none of your lip"
lip stick

Cigarette
lit
Drunk
live wire
1. Energetic, vibrant, individual e.g That joe is a real live wire
2. A person full of energy, pep, vim; a booster; a person trying to alter all down to his rotary ideals
living spit, living image
Exact image of
lizard ( as in lounge-lizard)
One fond of, a habitue
loaf
To idle, shirk, soldier on the job
loafer
An idler
lobby
To influence legislators; a group so employed
lobster
A man easily imposed on; specifically, a butter-and-egg man gold-dug or jewel coaxed
lock up
Jail
loco
Crazy, nuts, bugs, bughouse
loggerheads
To oppose on a question; come to blows
log-rolling
Back-scratching; a group who further each other's ends
lollygagger
1. Young man who enjoys making out
2. Lazy person; slacker; see idler
long run
Whole course or series of events
long sweetening
Molasses, treacle; opposed to sugar, or short sweetening
long-winded
Talky, talkative
loogan
Man with a gun
look alive or sharp
Be watchful
look or speak daggers
Express hatred by words or mien
look-out

Somebody keeping watch for approaching enemies, police, or any potential danger i.e. Person accompanying criminals while they commit a crime and warns them of approaching police or witnesses
looker
Good looking person of either sex especially a women
lookout
Watchman placed by a group, as of thieves
loon
An idiot
loony
Crazy
loose
Lax, as in morals; as, a loose woman
lord of creation
Man's name for himself, as opposed to dumb beasts
Lothario
A gallant, rake, libertine, sheik, Valentino
loud
Showy and vulgar in dress and manners
lounge lizard

Guy that is sexually active; ladies man

Example
It calls for a picked clientele of fans who are able to visualize and distinguish mortal from immortal as portrayed in the flesh. It will not appeal to the Flapper, the Lounge Lizard and Cake Eater, nor to the less intelligent.

— 1923 Exhibitors Trade Review Movie Review

lousy
Replete with, as with money
lousy with
Have abundance of
low down
Vulgar
lowbrow
An average person; one who prefers the poetry of Eddie guest
lulu
A hummer, speedy girl, racer
lummox
A stupid, clumsy fellow
lump it
To put up with, as from necessity
lump sum
A sum collectively of many- items
lump, in the
In its entirety
lug

Bullet
lynch law
Summary injustice meted out, especially to negroes, jews, Catholics, bootleggers, and strict Baptists and methodists, in various southern states
lynch law
Summary injustice meted out, especially to negroes, jews, Catholics, bootleggers, and strict Baptists and methodists, in various southern states

== M ==
m
Morphine
mac

Man; see also bo buster pal
mad after
Greatly infatuated with
mad, like
Furiously, recklessly; as, to drive like mad
mad money
Carfare home used by a flapper if she has a fight with her date
made
Recognized
madwag
Punster
mahogany, solid; ivory, solid,
Lacking brains
main drag
Most important street in a town or city
main squeeze
Primary female companion or girlfriend; lover; sweetheart; see squeeze
make
To seduce; as, a woman says, "he tried to make me"
make a book
To accept bets, as in horseracing
make a dead set
To try influence by persistence
make a face
Grimace
make it snappy
Hurry up
make tracks
Be off in a hurry
makings
Material for anything from a philosophy to a cigarette
man of straw
One put forward as an irresponsible tool
man, old
Husband, father, source of financial support
manacle
Wedding ring
map
Face
marathon
Endurance contest; as, a Charleston marathon
marathon, bible
Latest American indoor sport, in which both testaments are read aloud in relays at breakneck speed, to the glory of god
marbles
Pearls
mare's nest
A discovery that looks important, then turns out to be a hoax
mark

1. Targeted individual in a swindle or rigged game
2. Search for a probable location for a theft
maroon
An idiot; a fool; Gullible person
mash, make a mash on
Affect another sexually
masher
A professional fascinator of women
maverick
An unbranded, unruly animal
mawkish
Sentimental in an exaggerated or insincere way

Example
She plays a young wife whose husband falls for the assiduous attentions of a jazzy willo' the wisp. Many of the situations are mawkish and over sentimental, but Lila makes it all possible by her sincerity and poise.

— 1924 Photoplay Movie Review

mazuma
Money, cash, dollar bills
meal ticket
When he calls, the flapper invites the man to have dinner
mealy-mouthed
Overmild in fault-finding
meat wagon

Ambulance
medicine, good or bad
Straight dope or the reverse
meller

Melodrama film; see melodrama
mellerdrammer
Familiar or humorous name and spelling given to melodrama
mellow
Partly intoxicated; a negro spiritual

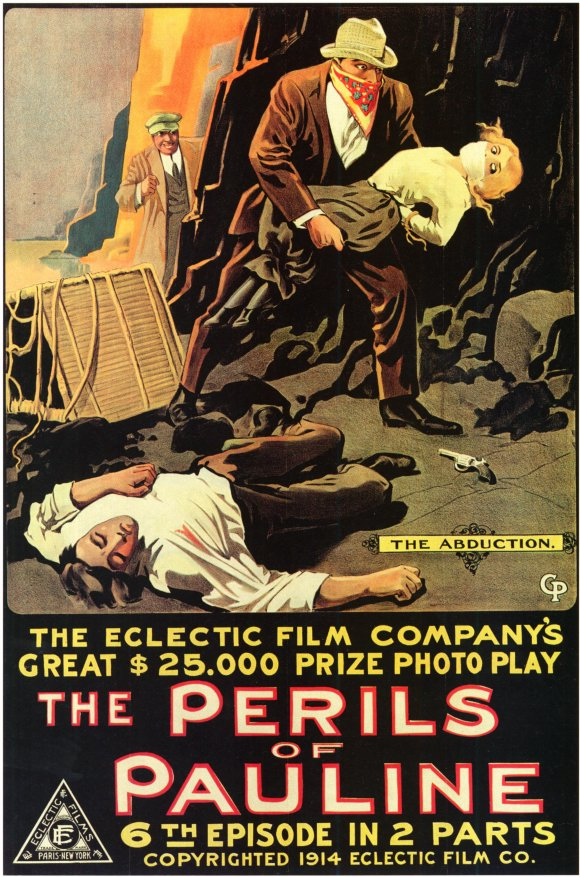
Poster for The Perils of Pauline (1914), a classic melodramatic film series

melodrama

Emotional drama featuring passionate love and heart-wrenching situations; any situation or action that is exaggerated
member
A person; usually qualified by hot, warm, etc.
meringue
Personality
michigan bankroll
Fake bankroll consists of a large denomination bill wrapped around several smaller denomination banknotes; also michigan roll; michigan stake
mick

Derogatory term for irishmen
mickey finn
strong hypnotic or barbiturate put secretly into a drink
middle aisle
Marry
middleman
Purchaser from the producer, who makes his profit from consumer or retailer
miff
A tantrum, petty quarrel. hence, miffed angry
milk-and-water
Namby-pamby, vacillating
mill

1. Typewriter
2. A pugilistic contest
mill, to go through the
To learn by hard experience

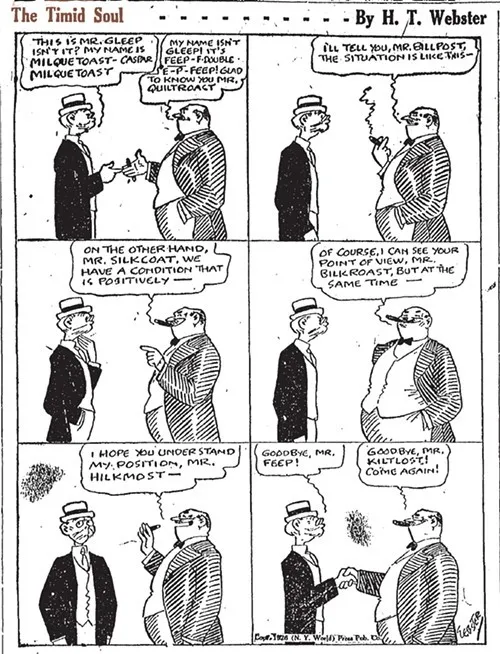
Milquetoast in Webster's The Timid Soul (Boston Daily Globe, January 13, 1926)

milquetoast

1. Henpecked male based on the Comic book character Caspar Milquetoast; very timid person; wimpy
mince matters
To affect extreme delicacy in speech
mind your potatoes
mind your own business
mint
A vast store; as, mint of money
minx
A forward, pert girl
mischief, the
The devil
missing link
Primitive form connecting man with the anthropoid apes, the pithecanthropus erectus of java; the negro, in the eyes of southern "thinkers"; an anti-evolutionist
missouri hummingbird
The mule
missouri, I'm from
You've got to show me
mitten, to get the
To be rejected as a lover
mittens, to handle without
To treat roughly
mitt

Hand
mix-up
General confusion
mob

Organized crime family or gang (not necessarily mafia)
mohaska
Gun, Firearm, Piece; see heat; also mohoska
moll
Gangster's girlfriend
mollycoddle
Excessively effeminate person
moniker

Name
monkey
Mischievous child; to trifle or fool about
monogolist
Young man who hates himself
mooch
Leave

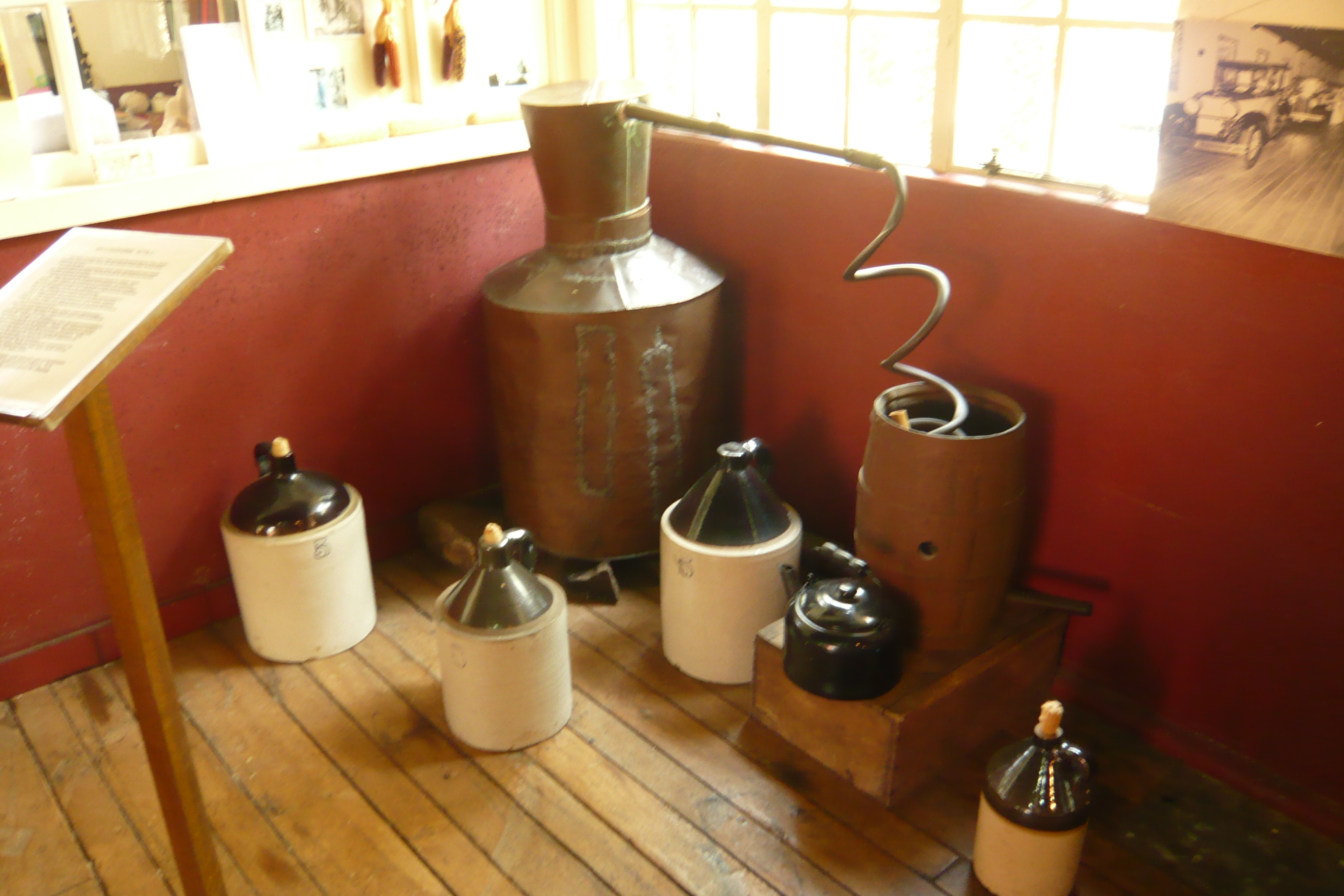
A historical moonshine distilling-apparatus in a museum

moonshine

1. Homemade alcohol; whiskey made from unlicensed distillers
2. Visionary plan; illicit liquor
mop
Handkerchief
mop up the earth, ground, or floor with
To thrash thoroughly
moss-back
A fossil, dodo, conservative, standpatter
mothball, to put into
Can it, forget it
mountain dew
Moonshine liquor
mourning, in
Black eyes. hence half mourning. one black eye
mouth, down in the
Depressed, dejected

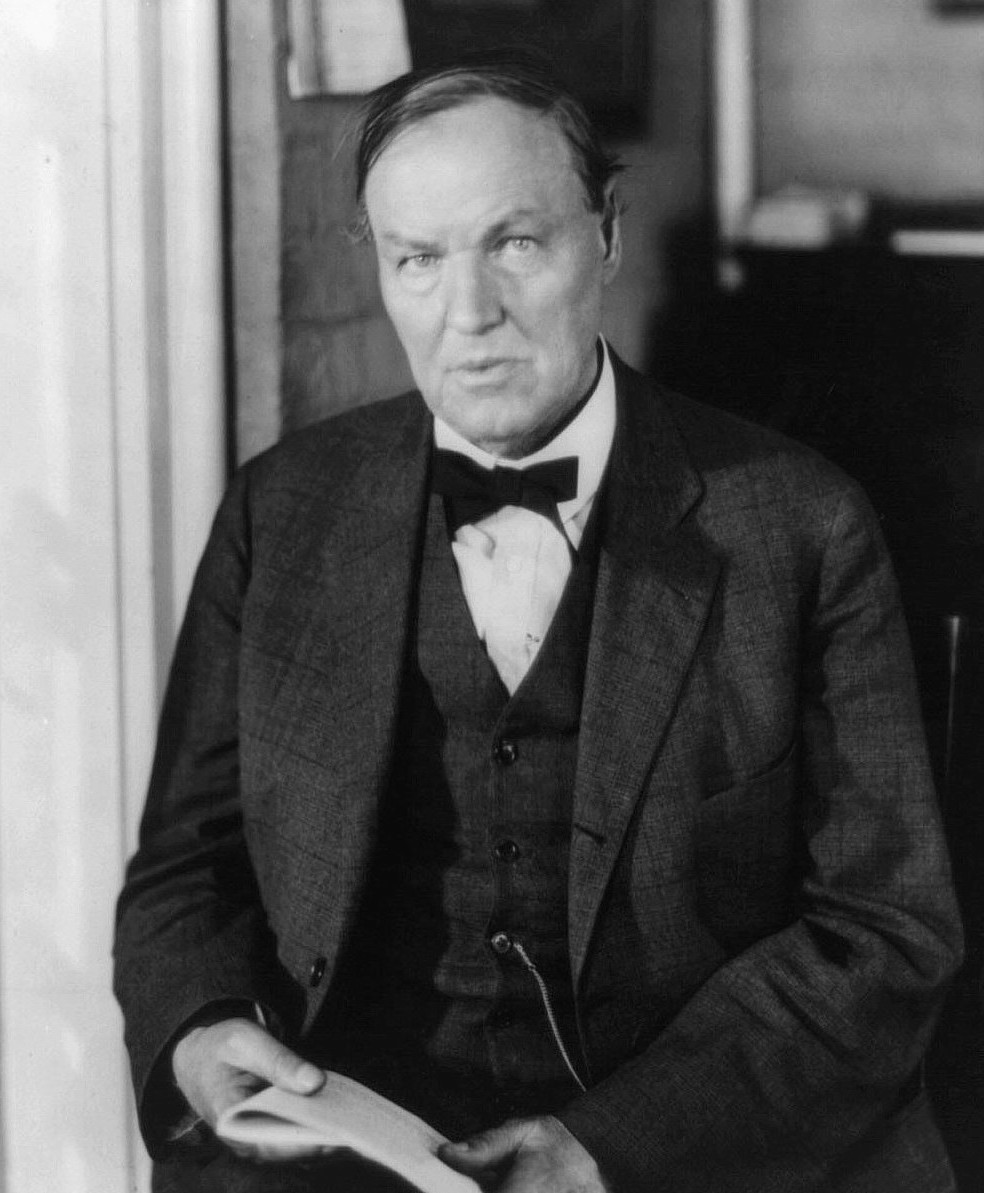
Clarence Darrow is considered one of the greatest defense attorney of the 20th century

mouthpiece

Lawyer especially criminal defense attorney
movie
Cinema, silver screen, motion pictures
mrs. grundy

A narrow-minded person or group that is overly concerned with censoring or criticizing personal conduct; priggish; tight-laced person; Prudish; derived from Grundy
mucker
A coarse, vulgar person; a rotter, cad
muckrake
To reveal scandal in politics and industry
muckraker
One who muckrakes
mud pipe
Opium pipe
mudslinger
One who throws outrageous aspersions
muff, to
To spoil a project
mug(s)
1. Men – especially refers to dumb ones; low, crude, fellow; lout
2. The face
mug, to
To photograph, especially said of criminals
mugwump
One who professes independence in politics
mulligan
Irish cop; police officer; prison guard
mum
Chrysanthemum; silent
mumbo-jumbo
Any popular god; demagog, charlatan
mummer
Strolling player, actor
munitions
Face powder
mush
Soft, pulpy talk, especially love talk
muss
Disturbance or fight; to soil or confuse
mustard, all to the
All excellent
mustard plaster
1. A boy who lingers around and is not wanted
2. One who clings when not wanted
mutt
A bum sport, an unliked person
mutton-head
A stupid, irascible man
muzzle
To impose silence on

== N ==
n.g.
No good
nag
To scold; a woman who scolds
nail, coffin
A cigarette
nailed
Caught by the police
nancy, miss
An effeminate man
nanny, get one's
To get one's goat
napping, to catch one
To take on unawares
nasty one in the eye
A telling blow
nature, in a state of
Unclothed, naked
nature-faker
A teller of untrue stories about nature, as of Santa Claus, the stork, the cherry tree, etc.
navvy
A ditch-digger, manual laborer
neck
1. Kiss passionately
2. In a dangerous spot
neck, to
To pet, philander, use flirt age
necker(s)
Girl who wraps her arms around her boyfriend's neck while dancing
necking-party
A party of indiscriminate fondling
necktie party
A hanging bee, a lynching
needful, the
Money
nerts!
That's Amazing
nerve
Impudence, audacity; as, "what a nerve"
nevada gas
Cyanide
newshawk
Reporter

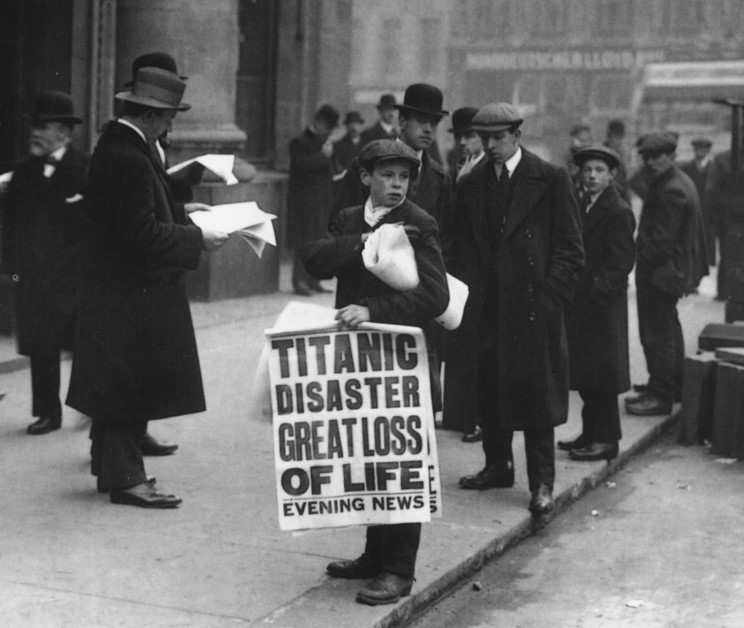
Headline news selling quickly in London, April 1912, following the Titanic disaster

newsie

person who sells or delivers newspapers; reporter
nibble
To rise to a bait in trading
nibble one
Have a drink
nibs, his nibs
A person who exaggerates his importance
nicked
Stolen
nifty
1. Great, excellent; competently
2. A joke, a wise crack
night-rider
A masked mounted night criminal
nip
A small drink
nippers
Handcuffs
nix
No, not
no chicken
Advanced in years
no end
A great deal
no flies on
Active and wide-awake
no go
No use, impossible
no kid
No deception, no joke, hence, no kidding.
nob
The head; or, a swell, from "nobleman"
nobody home
Used to describe someone who is perceived as unintelligent or mentally challenged
noddle, noodle
The head
noggin
The head
noodle juice
Tea
noodle-soup
Nonsense, applesauce
nookie

Sex act; sexual activity
nosebag, put on the
To feed one's face, eat
nosebaggery
Restaurant
not so good!
Personally disapprove
note-shaver
Money lender, usurer, discounter of notes. as, the kaiser discounted Wilson's notes
nothing to it
Of no consequence
now then
Look out for the next thing
now you're on the trolley
Now you're right; now you've got it! (1920) i.e. Now you're on board
nubbin
Anything dwarfed or imperfect
number
clever resourceful Person
number 1
Oneself
numskull
Dunce, blockhead
nut, hard
Silly or eccentric person, lunatic
nut, hard
A desperado, bad man
nutty
Completely unbalanced, crazy

== O ==
o.k.
Correct; to approve
oats, wild
Youthful follies; once exclusively masculine
oatmeal mush
The superficial conversation of a cake eater
obituary notice
Eviction declaration
ocean greyhound
A fast ocean-plying ship
oceans of
An undoubted amount of
odds
Matters or conditions on an unequal basis, as the proportions of a wager
odds, what's the
What's the difference?
off color
Unsatisfactory, open to suspicion
off his nut, hinges, or trolley
Mentally unsound
off the reel
Immediately
off the track
This person becomes insanely violent when they go off the track
off with you
Get out
off, gone off
Crazy
oh yeah!
I doubt it!
oil burner
Person who chews gum
oil, to strike
To make a fortune suddenly
oilcan
An impostor
old
Used to convey affection, as in old bean, old boy, old chap, old dear, old fellow, old thing, old top
old bird
A person of experience
old fops
People who are older than middle age
old gentleman, old harry, old nick
The devil
old man
term of address; also old fruit; also old boy e.g."How's everything old boy?"
oliver twist
Skilled dancer
omnibibulous
Able to consume almost any alcoholic beverage, or likely to do so
on a toot
On a drinking spree
on the lam

Running away, usually from the police; see lam, on the

Example
Reviewing the 1928 "The Racket" – Eight January Chicago, racketeers who, for various good reasons, or on the lam and temporarily going straight in Los Angeles, we're rounded up and induced to work and this crook melodrama.

— 1928 Motion Picture Classic Movie Review

on the level
Legitimate, honest
on the up and up
On the level
on, to be
To understand a thing
once over, o.o.
A survey, a look entirely over
one-horse
Paltry, inferior; as, a one-horse town
op

Detective
open and shut
Must be accepted or rejected in its entirety
open up
Talk up, speak out
orchid
Expensive item
orphan paper
Bad checks
ossified
Alternate names for intoxicated; see § drunk
ostrich
Person who is a Know-it-all
out on parole
Divorced
out on the roof
Alternate names for intoxicated; see § drunk
over, half seas
Half drunk
owl
Person who is out late or stays up late
owled
Alternate names for intoxicated; see § drunk
own, on one's
By oneself, at one's own risk
oyster fruit
Pearls

== P ==
packing, to send
To dismiss peremptorily
packing heat
Carrying a gun
pain, to give one a
To cause one annoyance
paint the town red
To party and celebrate in a boisterous and unruly fashion, especially in public areas e.g. to show the big city how red paint should be applied
pal

Man; see also bo buster mac
palaver
Idle talk, flattery
palooka

1. Social outsider based on comic strip character joe palooka first devised in 1921; also paluka; palooker
2. Large, below-average or stupid man; mediocre or inferior boxer
pan
Face
pan out
To produce, develop
pan, to
To knock, criticize adversely
panhandle
To beg; hence panhandler
panic
Produce big favorable reaction from one's audience
panther piss
Raw or inferior whiskey; rotgut; see panther sweat
panther sweat
Raw or inferior whiskey; rotgut; see panther piss
papa
Middle aged man who falls for gold-diggers, Sheba's, and vamps sugar-coated papa, one well to do
pard, partner
A partner
park
To leave an auto in an open space. used also of people: "don't park in my parlor"
parson's nose
Rear end of cooked fowl; also called pope's nose, rabbi's nose, Darwin's nose
party
An entertainment; amorous tumbling
pass on, to
1. Christian science euphemism for "to die;" It has become general throughout these rotaries states that nobody has died since Christ - all the rest have "passed on"
2. To give way to the next person's word
paste

1. Hit; Strike very hard;Punch
2. To strike a blow; "I'll paste you one in the bean"
pastorium
A pastor's house; a sky pilot's bunk
pathos

The characteristic of something that stirs emotions and passions, particularly evoking tender feelings like pity and sorrow

Example
Dorothy Davenport handles the part of Violetta in an appealing manner, obtaining considerable pathos in the latter scenes

— 1916 issue The Moving Picture World

patsy

Person who is set up i.e. person takes the blame for a crime; victim; fool or chump
paw

Hand
peach
To inform or tattle-tale upon; hence, peacher
peach, peacherino
An attractive girl; anything nice or noticeable, as "a peach of a cold"
peaching
Informing
peanut
Small, insignificant thing or person
peanut politics
Small, mean, underhand, or congressional politics
peart
Fresh, joyous, as in I feel right peart, cal.
pecker
The mouth, the kisser; courage, as in "keep your pecker up"
peeper

Detective
peepers

Eyes
peeved
Angry, irritated
peg away
To work at industriously
peg out
To die
pen
Penitentiary; a home fit only for hogs
pen yen
Opium
penny dreadful
A cheap sensational paper
pep
Vim, vigor, energy
peppy
Energetic and full of vitality
percolate
1. To happen
2. As of 1925, to run smoothly and well
perk up
Cheer up
pernickety, persnickety
Contrary, difficult to please, pesky. troublesome, vexatious
pet
1. Necking
2. Making out
pet to
To excite by fondling; flirt age
peterman

Safecracker who uses Nitroglycerin
petting pantry
Movie theater or cinema
peter out
To be exhausted, fail through anemia
petticoat
A woman. petticoats used to be articles of female attire; succeeded by camisoles, step-ins, combinations, teddy-bears, teddies, buff etc.
petting party

1. One or more couples making out in a room; Devoted to hugging, or kissing games
2. Social event devoted to hugging
3. A stimulating fondle
phiz
Face, physiognomy
phonus balonus
Complete nonsense
pick up
To scrape acquaintance with tor erotic purposes
pickle
A plight, a predicament
pickled
Drunk, soused, stewed to the upper gills
pick-me-up
A stimulating beverage
pickpocket

Pickpocketing involves the stealing of money or other valuables from the person or a victim's pocket without them noticing the theft

Example
but the pickpocket upsets the boat by relieving a number of the guests of their valuables, and then being obliged to flee

— 1916 The Moving Picture World

pie-eyed
Drunk
piece
Gun
piffle
Nonsense, twaddle, applesauce, stewed rhubarb
pigeon

Stool-pigeon
piker
1. Grasping person; cheapskate
2. One who will take the least risk especially to help others; coward
3. Lazy person
4. Small time burglar; cheat
5. A gambler in a small way; a slacker of one's share
pill
1. Someone who irritates you e.g. "That person is being a real pill"
2. Teacher
3. Bullet
4. See Cigarette
5. A disagreeable person
pillowcase
Young man who is full of feathers
pinch, at a
In an emergency
pinch(ed)
Arrested e.g. He was pinched by the coppers
pinko

Liberal; freespirit
pins
Legs
pip
A state of depression; a low card
pipe
See or notice
pipe down
Stop talking
pipes
Throat
pipe that
Did you listen to that
pipe this
Notice this
pippin
A desired woman, a peacherino
pirate
A landlord or industrial magnate; a thief of uncopyrighted literary material
pitching woo

Making love
plastered
Alternate names for intoxicated; see § drunk
plant
Someone who disguises themselves as neutral or affiliated with an organization, yet covertly works with another person or external group
platonic love
Love presbyterian on the surface
play around with
Keep company with, pet
playboy
Older boyfriend
plucked, to be
To flunk an examination
plug
To boost a song. hence, song-plugger.
plug(s)
1. Blow, punch; bullet wound
2. People
plug-hat
High silk hat
plug-ugly
A tough city ruffian, gangster
plum
Public office in return for political service
plumb
Entirely; as, plumb nutty, plumb Christian
plum-tree, shake thee
Distribute political patronage
plunge
To speculate recklessly
plutonic love
Censored by pure act and deed law
poke

Bankroll; roll of money; money in general
poke fun
To joke, jest
poky
Dull, spiritless,
polack
A pole
polar bear
One who swims in cold winter
police-dog
Young woman's fiance
polish off
To complete, defeat
poop(ed)
1. Shoot or kill someone
2. Information; the low-down
poor
A depreciating adjective, as in poor fish, one who lacks besom, pep, energy
poor stick
One lacking initiative; a human puncture
poor white trash
A 100 per cent free and unterrified Nordic financial and mental pauper in the southern states, whose family never owned slaves. if a child of poor white trash becomes president, historians at once raise his ancestors to the aristocracy
pop

Shoot or kill someone; poop
pop the question
To propose marriage; to dare conjugal shipwreck
poppycock
Boastful nonsense; trifle; stale tripe
pork
Gift or contribution to party funds; federal patronage
pork barrel
An election fund; congressional appropriation for patronage
posilutely
Absolutely
possum, to play
To pretend to be dead, to lie low
potato
A person; as in a big potato, small potatoes
potted

Alternate names for intoxicated; see § drunk
pow-wow
A meeting where talk and not business prevails
pretty
Ironically used, as in "a pretty mess"
prex, prexy
Colleges for president
prig
One assuming moral superiority. hence priggishness, priggery, prig Dom, etc.
primed
Approaching a state of drunkenness; see § drunk
primp, prink
To doll up, dress ostentatiously
primrose path, or way
Road to hell; anything pleasant
priscilla
Stay-at-home girl
pro skirt
Prostitute
produce the cash
Kiss me!
prof
Professor
profiteer
A substantial, well-to-do citizen, who gouges the public
proud, to do oneself
To show to advantage
prune
A lemon, flat tire; as in, poor prune
prune pit
Anything that is traditional
puff
To blurb, praise unduly
puffing
smoke opium
pug
Pugilist, Boxer
pull
Influence, advantage
pull a daniel boone
Vomit
pull off
To accomplish
pull the strings, wires, ropes
Set in motion secretly
pull up stakes
Strike camp; prepare to move
pump
1. To question discreetly; extract facts from
2. Heart
pump metal
Shoot bullets; see squirt metal
punch the bag
Small talk
punch rustler
Individual who spends the majority of their time at parties near the refreshments
punk

Hood, Thug
puppy
A vain, unmannered fool; a young person
puritan
One scrupulous about the morals of others; one who holds that the pleasant is always wicked
purp
A dog
push
Vim, energy, pep; a crowd
pussyfoot
To work by stealth and se
pushover
Person easily convinced or seduced
puss
Face
put down
Drink
put the bee on
To beg from; to borrow money from
put the screws on
1. Harass using extreme coercive pressure
putting on the ritz

1. Demonstration of affluence and lavishness; Pretend to be superior; After the Ritz Hotel in Paris (and its namesake César Ritz; see Ritzy
2. Wear fashionable and attention-grabbing clothing: Ritzy; also put on the dog
3. Puttin' On the Ritz is a song written by Irving Berlin in 1927

== Q ==
q.t. on the strict
Secretly, quietly
quality
The upper classes, people of social position and public morals
queen
A woman, especially a peach, a Sheba
queer
1. Counterfeit
2. Mishandle something
quiff
1. Cheap prostitute e.g. I'm no quiff!
quilt
Drink that warms one up
quiz
A questioning, questionnaire

== R ==
radical
One who believes in anything you disagree with; any person of intelligence
rag
A woman; a piece of jazz music
rag-a-muffin
Disheveled, Dirty individual; hooligan, lout
rag, to chew the
To talk incessantly about
ragamuffin
A tattered vagabond
rags
Clothes
rags, glad
Best clothes; hallelujah garb
ragtime
Jazz, modern dance music
rain pitchforks
Downpour; rain heavily
raise a racket·, the mischief, cain, the devil, a row, a rumpus
Create a disturbance
rake off
A share of profits, usually illegal
rally
Political meeting to disseminate wholesale blah
rambunctious
Rude, noisy, turbulent
rampage
A dashing about with violence
ranked
Observed; Given the once-over
rant
To be uproariously gay; to rage about
rap
Criminal charge
rappers
Informers; professional perjurer
rapscallion
A worthless rascal
rare
Extraordinary; as in a rare good time, a rare 'un
raspberry, razz, to give
To express disapproval
rate
Merit; deserve; count for something
rat

1. Treacherous; disgusting person; stool pigeon
2. College freshman; vermin of the rodent family
rats and mice
Dice, e.g. craps
rattle
To disturb self-possession, fluster, disconcert
rattler
Train
rattlebox, rattlebrain, rattlehead, rattlepate
Nobody at home; an empty-head; an empty-head
rattletrap
A chatterbox, talkative woman
ratty
Despicable, worthless
rave about
Express wild admiration for
raw deal
Bad treatment
razz

To make fun of someone
razzle-dazzle
Giddy confusion or bewilderment; razz
real mccoy
Genuine item
red
A communist, socialist, Bolshevik, radical, prohibitionist, anti-prohibitionist, or member of any belief differing from yours
redhot
Sort of criminal
red-light
Eject from a car or train
red tape
Official formality and delay. hence, red tapeworm, a dilatory official
redcap
Porter at a railway station
red-eye
Cheap, strong whiskey
red-hot
Extreme, passionate; as in "red hot mama"
redlight
Bawdy, harlotry

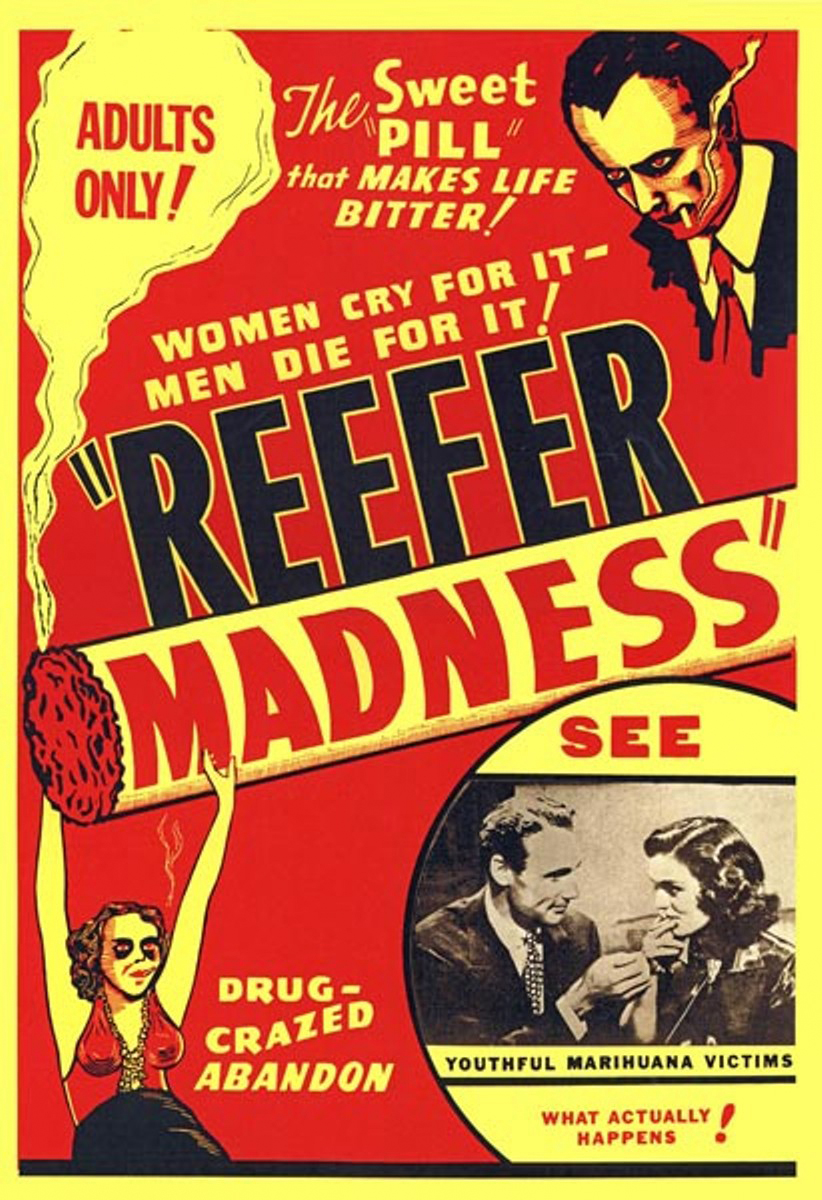
Reefer Madness (originally made as Tell Your Children and sometimes titled The Burning Question, Dope Addict, Doped Youth, and Love Madness) is a 1936 American exploitation film about drugs

reefer

marijuana cigarette
regular
Real; genuine; normal; average i.e. Regular fella
reel boy
Man who likes to watch movies
reuben
Unsophisticated country bumpkin; rube; fool
rhatz
Exclamation of disappointment; darn!
rhino
Money
rib
A woman from the major surgical operation on Adam
ride for a fall
Ride in a cocksure way to a tumble
ride him
To kid, fool, make fun of him
rifle
To steal thoroughly
right
Indicating quality
right gee
Quality guy
right o
Annoying British expression of approval
rigmarole, rigamarole
Rambling statement, nonsense
rile
To stir to anger
ring off
Quit, stop
ringer
Political repeater
ringers
Fakes
ringtailed roarer
Braggart, blowhard
ripping
Fine, exceptional, great
ritzy
Swell, elegant, up-to-date, junior league
ritz
Stuck up
ritzy
Elegant; luxurious i.e. from the hotel
roast
Criticize severely
rock of ages
Woman over the age of 30
rock, the
Alcatraz
rod

Gun
roost, gone to
Retired for the night
root
To work loudly for anything. hence, rooter
rope in, to
To entice or allure
roscoe
Gun

Example
I jammed the roscoe in his button and said, "Close your yap, bo, or I squirt metal."

— In his article for the Ottawa Citizen, William Denton mentioned Sam Spade, the famous detective character from Dashiell Hammett's works, quoting him as saying:

rot
Twaddle, nonsense, stewed prunes
rotgut
Bad or cheap or bootleg liquor; see panther sweat
rotter
A cad, undesirable person
rough, rough-neck
A tough, rowdy
roughhouse, to
To create a disturbance
rub
Dancing party
rub-out
Killing
rubber
To turn the head to see. "lot's wife, before she turned to salt, turned to rubber."
rubberneck
Constant rubberier
rubberneck-wagon
Sightseeing car
rube(s)

1. Bumpkin; Easy mark
2. Countryman, hick, jay
rughopper
Man who does not date
rug shaking
Dancing the shimmy
rum
Odd, good, excellent, strong
rum hound
Soak, drinker, scofflaw
rum row
The liquor-laden fleet 12 miles out
rumble, The
News
rummy
Alternate names for intoxicated; § drunk; also rum seller; bootlegger
rumpus
Noise, disturbance

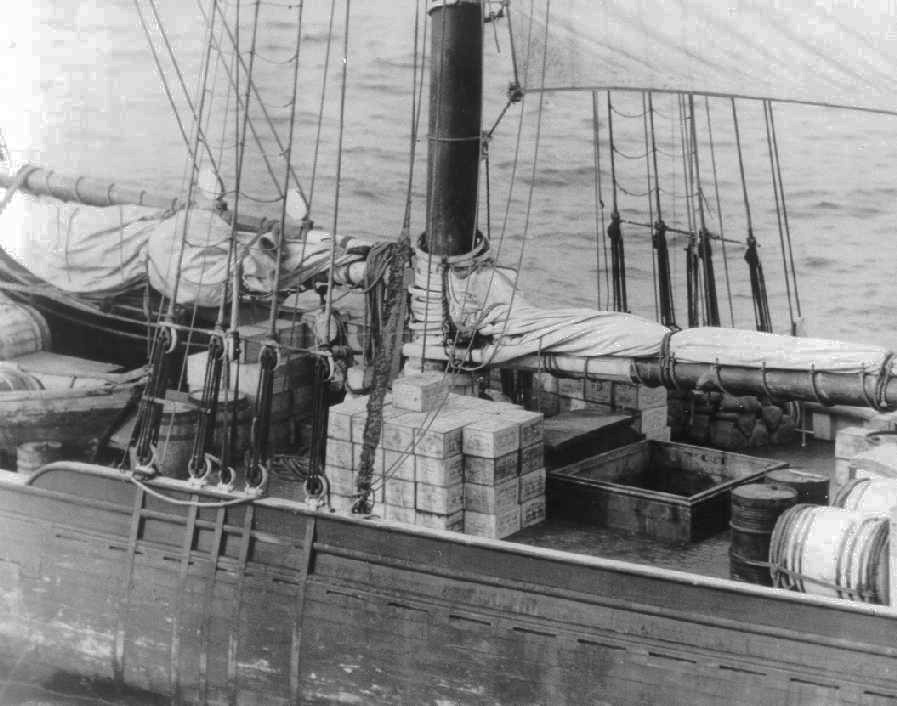
Rum runner sloop "Kirk and Sweeney" with contraband stacked on deck 1924

rumrunner

1. Individual who smuggles any form of alcohol
2. Vessel employed for the illegal transportation of alcoholic beverages
run across
To meet, encounter
run after
To seek the company of
run-down
Weakened or exhausted
run in
To arrest, lork up
run one's gums
Argue; talk excessively; see bump gums
run out
Leave or escape
running, out of the
Disqualified
runt
A short or undersized man or woman
rustle
Hurry up and provide; as "rustle out some food."
rustler
A cattle thief

== S ==
sack, to give or get the
To be discharged from work
sail in
Proceed boldly into
sam hill
The devil, as in "what the sam hill!" Sam's father was bunker hill, shortened to bunk hill
sand
Guts, grit, courage
sap
Fool, stupid person; see Finale hopper
sap poison
Getting hit with a sap
saphead
A fool
sappy
1. Emotional, nostalgic, mushy; see mawkish
2. Foolish, stupid; see sap
savvy
Understand

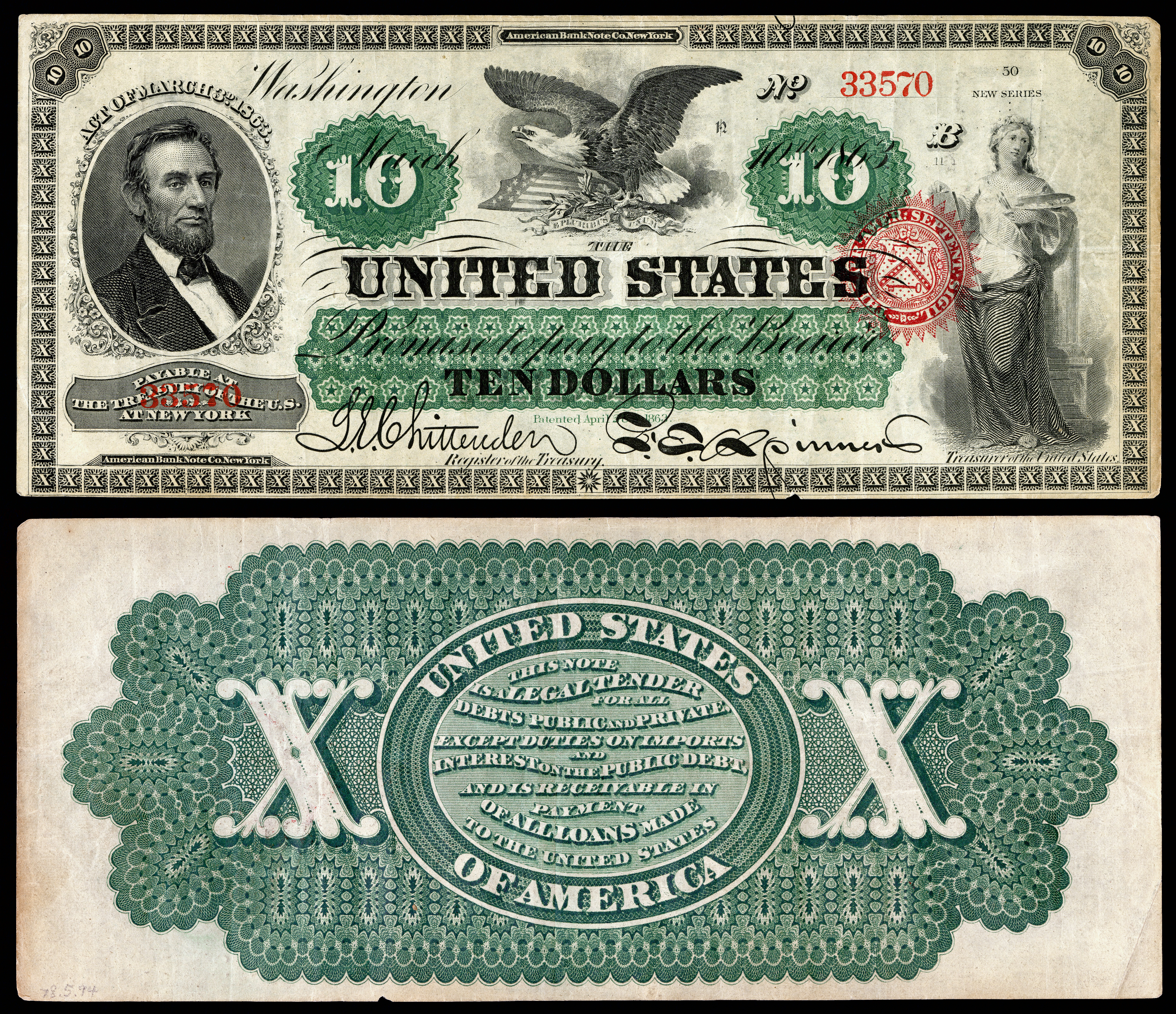
A $10 Legal Tender Note from the Series 1862-1863 greenback issue

sawbuck

$10 bill e.g. a double sawbuck is a $20 bill or half-sawbuck is $5.00
sawbones
A surgeon
say-so
One's personal assertion
says you
A response of skepticism; A defiant exclamation!
scab
Strike-breaker, blackleg, non-union laborer
scads
Money, resources, lots of
scalawag
A good for nought; native southern republican during reconstruction
scalp
To cut prices, as ticket-scalpers; to cheat
scatter
1. Saloon or speakeasy
2. Hideout; room; lodging
schnozzle

Nose; see also beezer smeller
scofflaw

A person who openly violates the law, particularly by not adhering to a law that is challenging to enforce
scoot
Hurry or dart off quickly
scorcher
A speed-bug, as in motoring
scram
Leave immediately; flee; also scram out
scrape
1. Fight, scuffle.
2. Predicament, awkward situation.
scrape acquaintance
Make friends casually. Insinuate into intimacy.
scratch

1. Money
2. Starting even
scratch a ticket
To vote a mixed ticket, to vote for candidates of more than one party
scratch, up to
Entirely prepared, as promised
scratched
In horse-racing; a horse withdrawn
scratcher
Forger
screaming meemies
State of anxiety; jitters; state of nervous hysteria; see heebie jeebies
screw
1. In pre-1930 talkies, screw is used to tell a character to leave
2. Get lost, get out
3. Prison guards
4. In horse-racing, a horse withdrawn.
screws loose
Mentally unsound
screwy
Crazy; eccentric e.g. "you're screwy!"
scrooched
Alternate names for intoxicated; see § drunk
scrooge
To worm one's self forward, in a crowd
scrub
Anything mean or paltry
scrumptious
Fine, bully, splendid
season, open or hunting; closed season
Periods when a thing may or may not be done
see a man about a dog

I've got to leave now i.e. to have a drink
seedy
Run to seed, shabby
seetie
Things that flappers despise
sell
A hoax, deception
sell short
To sell securities as yet unpurchased, expecting to buy them later more cheaply
send over
Send to jail
send up
To send one to prison
sentiment

Emotions, particularly gentle emotions, exist separately from logic or judgment, and are often seen as weak or foolish; Originating from emotions instead of reasoning; also sentimental
set up the crowd
Pay for all the drinks, etc.
shady side of, on the
To be more than; of one's age
shake
To shake hands
shake a leg, a limb, a hoof
Dance, or move more speedily
shake-down
An enforced levy; extortion, blackmail; a rough western dance
shakes, in a couple of
In a minute
shakes, no great
Of small importance
shamus

Private detective
shanks's mare

One's own legs. hence, to ride shank's mare. to walk
shark
An expert; also a gouger, man-eater, as in loan-shark
sharp practice
Hard bargaining, tricky dealing
sharper(s)

1. Swindlers, especially at cards
2. Sneaky person

Example
The two sharpers escape and join another member of the confidence game.

— 1916 The Moving Picture World

sharpshooter
A good dancer who spends his money freely
shatting on your uppers
To be in financial despair; see uppers
sheba
1. Stylish and attractive woman; woman with sex appeal; originates from the film The Queen of Sheba
2. A she-sheik, vamp, siren, seductress, queen, the end of every man's desire
shebang
The whole group
sheepskin
College diploma in American education, ranked far below the pigskin
sheik

1. A man who believes he is irresistible to women (from the Valentino movies)
2. I'm going out in search of female conquests
3. Young man dressed in a fashionable manner
4. A he-Sheba, a romantic he-man, a caveman lover
shekels
Money
shelf, laid an the
Laid aside
shell game
A swindling game, consisting or guessing under which of three shells the pea is hidden. it is always under the other one
shell out
To hand over or pay money
shells

Bullets
shenanigan
Humbug, nonsense, trickery
shifter
Grafter
shifty
Untrustworthy, tricky
shilly-shally
Undetermined, dallying
shimmy
A dance accompanied by a shivery wriggle of arms, and shoulders
shindy, shindig
A row, disturbance, spree; originally a dance
shine box
Club showcasing live performances by black jazz musicians
shine, to cut a
To make a display
shinny up, shin up
Climb up by aid of the shins
shinplaster
Originally any paper money; continental us paper mopey before 1789, not "worth a continental," or worthless"
shirk
A slacker, a soldiered on the job
shirt on, keep your
Don't lose your temper
shiv

Knife
shoat, shote
A pig younger than a ' year; a worthless person
shoddy
Cloth from shredded woolen rags; anything cheap, like campaign promises
shoes, to die in one's
To die by violence
shoestring, to start business on a
To start a business on small capital
shoot it
Go ahead
shooting iron
A gun
shop, to talk
To talk about one's own business
shoplifter
A store thief. hence, shoplifting
shopping, window
To make the rounds of store windows without purchasing
short
Hard up
shot
Drunk. hence, half-shot. half-drunk
show case
Wealthy man's wife decked out in jewels
shucks
As an expletive, "nonsense!"
shut up
Can the chatter; elide the loquacity
shy at, have a
Make an attempt to do
shylock
Unscrupulous moneylender
shyster
Untrustworthy and despicable lawyer or politician
sic a dog on
To encourage a dog to attack one
side
Pretentious display; swank. hence, to put on side
side-light
Indirect information
silly ass
Person given to frequent ·blundering
silver screen
The movies, the cinema
silver-tongued
Able to speak blah eloquently; used of the late colonel Bryan of Florida real estate fame
simoleon(s)
Dollar(s)
simon pure
The genuine article
simple
Weak of intellect
sinews of war
Money
sing
Inform; incriminate oneself and others; see canary
sing small
To lower one's· demand; eat humble pie
sinker
Doughnut or biscuit
sip
Female dancer
sissy
An effeminate boy or man; a miss Nancy
sister
Woman, girl
sit tight
Wait quietly for the next move
sit up
To take notice
sitting pretty
Being in a superior and extremely pleasant position
sixes and sevens, at
In confusion, dismay
sixty, to go like
To travel fast. also "like forty."
skate around
Woman of easy virtue
skedaddle
Scatter
skee
1. Scotch Whiskey; see jorum of skee
2. Opium (1930)
skeet
Skedaddle, scatter, depart
skeezicks
A scamp, rascal, rogue
skid row

Area or neighborhood often visited by homeless individuals, vagrants, wanderers; Struggling and without resources
skidoo
Beat it, depart, "23 for you"
skimp
To give a niggardly allowance of skin to cheat; a cheater
skinflint
Miser; said to be able to skin flint
skip
To flee the country, make off quickly
skirt
A girl, woman, attractive female
skit
A light, humorous literary parody or lampoon
skunk
A disliked person; an opposing politician
sky
To hang high, as pictures at an exhibition
sky-pilot
Preacher, minister, pastor, priest, rabbi, a guide to eternal bliss and from eternal blisters
slam
To find fault with continually
slang-slinger
Slang talker
slang-whang
To talk boisterously and abusively
slat
Young man or boyfriend
slate
Prepared political ticket to be 0k'd by voters
slant, get a
Take a look
slapper
Reformer or the antithesis of a flapper
slathers
An abundance
slave-driver
An exacting employer; an employer
slavocracy
Slave-owners controlling the prerecession south
sleep, to put to
To knock out, as in boxing
sleuth

Detective
slick
Smooth-tongued, oily
slick up
To primp
sling ink
To write profusely and carelessly
slip a cog
To make an error unconsciously
slip up
To make a failure of; make a mistake
slop over
To bubble over with enthusiasm; spill affection over
sloppy
Slovenly, inefficient
slouch
A clumsy lout
slouch debutante
An affected shambling gait
slow-coach
A sluggard, laggard, slow person
slug
1. Knock unconscious
2. Bullet
slum
A squalid neighborhood; to visit slums out of curiosity or sociological interest
slump
A heavy fall in prices
sly, on the
Secretly
smack
To kiss
small talk
Unimportant conversation
smart
Bright, shrewd, intelligent
smart Aleck
A cocksure, opinionated person
smash
A break-up of any kind; to fail in business
smear
Utter success; a failure
smell
A faint suggestion or hint
smeller

Nose; see also schnozzle beezer
smile, I should
I should say so
smith brother
Man who never pays i.e. coughs up
smoke
A cigar; a negro
smoked
1. Consuming inexpensive low-quality alcoholic beverages and becoming intoxicated; see § drunk
2. Engaging in the act of smoking opium or a marijuana cigarette
smoke-eater
Any Smoker
smooth
Man who cannot be trusted
smudger
Close dancer
smut
Indecency, obscenity; hence, smutty, as the story of Abishag, of lot's daughters, of the Levite's concubine, etc.
smut-hound
Vice investigator, enamored of smut
snag
A hidden or unexpected obstacle
snail
A slow, lazy person
snake
A habitue, used in parlor-snake, lounge-snake, and the like; a hound, a lizard
snake charmer
Woman involved in bootlegging
snakes, to see
To suffer from delirium tremens
snap
Force, vigor, pep, vim, go
snap a cap
Fire a gun shot
snap one's head off
To speak angrily
snap out of it
Show some pep
snappy
Full of energy, smart, classy, ritzy
snappy, make it
Hurry up
snatch
Kidnapping
sneakers or sneaks
Soft-soled shoes
sneak-thief
One who thieves through unfastened windows or doors
sneeze
1. portion of a powered narcotic e.g., cocaine
2. Arrest
3. Kidnapped
4. Steal
snickersnee
A large knife
sniff, to
To sniff cocaine
sniffer
cocaine addict or user
snippish, snippy
Peevish, tart
snitch
Informer, or to inform; see stool pigeon
snob
A person affecting gentility in vulgar fashion; who snubs those below and lickspittles those above him
snooker
Cheat, swindle
snooper

Private detective
snoop
To pry into another's affairs
snoot, sneezer, sniffer
The nose
snooze
Sleep
snort
To laugh boisterously
snort(s)
Drink(s) of liquor
snow
1. Theatrical deadheads
2. cocaine
snowbird
A dope addict; narcotic fiend; cocaine addict
snub
To repress by a tart, sarcastic reply; to slight socially
snub-nose
A slight nose turned up at the end
snugglepup
Young man who frequents petting parties
so, is that?
Expletive of doubt
so's your old man
Reply of irritation; retort to an insult or slur
soak
1. Pawn used as collateral e.g. put into soak
2. A pawnbroker's shop; in pawn, pawned
3. Drink; heavy drinking session
4. Despised person
soap, soft
Flattery
soap-box
Portable platform for street speakers
sob stuff
Printed matter to evoke weeps
sob sister

1. Female newshawk attempting to provoke a response from her readers through her emotional reporting
2. Woman who writes "human interest" stories, overburdened with sentimentality
sociable
A dull evening party at a church
sock
Punch; clobber
sock, to
To hit a blow: as, "sock on the sniffer"
sockdollager
1. An event or action that holds great significance; An individual or object that is extraordinary, marvelous, or exceptional
2. A finishing blow

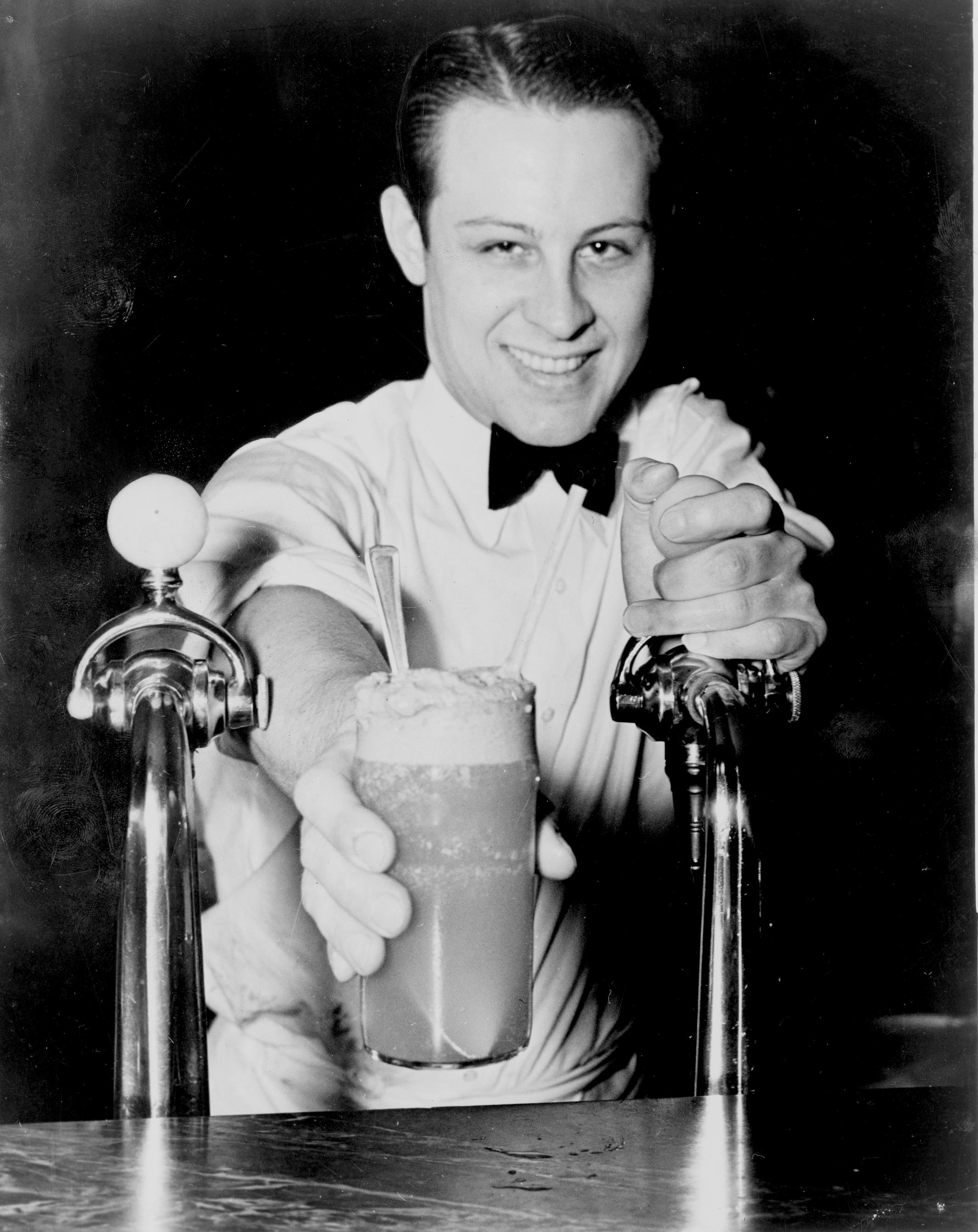
Soda jerk passing ice cream soda between two soda fountains. USA, 1936

soda jerk

Person who works at a soda fountain and dispense soda from a tap; also jerks soda
sodbuster
Undertaker
soft, softie
Of weak intellect; simple
soft shoe
Trail behind someone
soft snap or thing
Easy to attain, sinecure
soldier
Loiter on the job; shirk
solid ivory, mahogany, etc
Brainless, lacking gray matter
solid, to be solid for
Wholeheartedly for
some
Of considerable importance; as, "some party!"
son of a female canine
An insult, unless said with a smile
son of a gun
Affectionate term of address
song
A matter of little consequence; except to Irving berlin, et al
sophomoric
Inflated style, from sophomore, a second year collegian
sore
Pained, vexed, touchy, angry
sorehead
A dissatisfied, discontented person
sort of
To some extent
sorts, of
Unsatisfactory, mediocre
sos
A call for help: "save, oh save!"
so's your old man
An expletive, a snappy retort; used thus: "thank you" "so's your old man!"
so-so
Fair to middling; mediocre
sound
To approach, to try out, to fathom
soup
Soup-like mixture created by dissolving the stick of dynamite in hot water to create Gelignite nitroglycerin, then the crude nitroglycerin is used for breaking open safes
soup man
skilled criminal specializing in using nitroglycerin to crack open safes
sour on
To become tired of, or bitter about
souse
One who drinks to excess; to drink to excess
sow
A woman not liked
spade(s)
Derogatory term for African-Americans
spank
A smart, sounding blow, usually on the buttocks
spark
To spoon or make love to a lover
sparrowgrass
Asparagus
spat
A petty quarrel, tiff

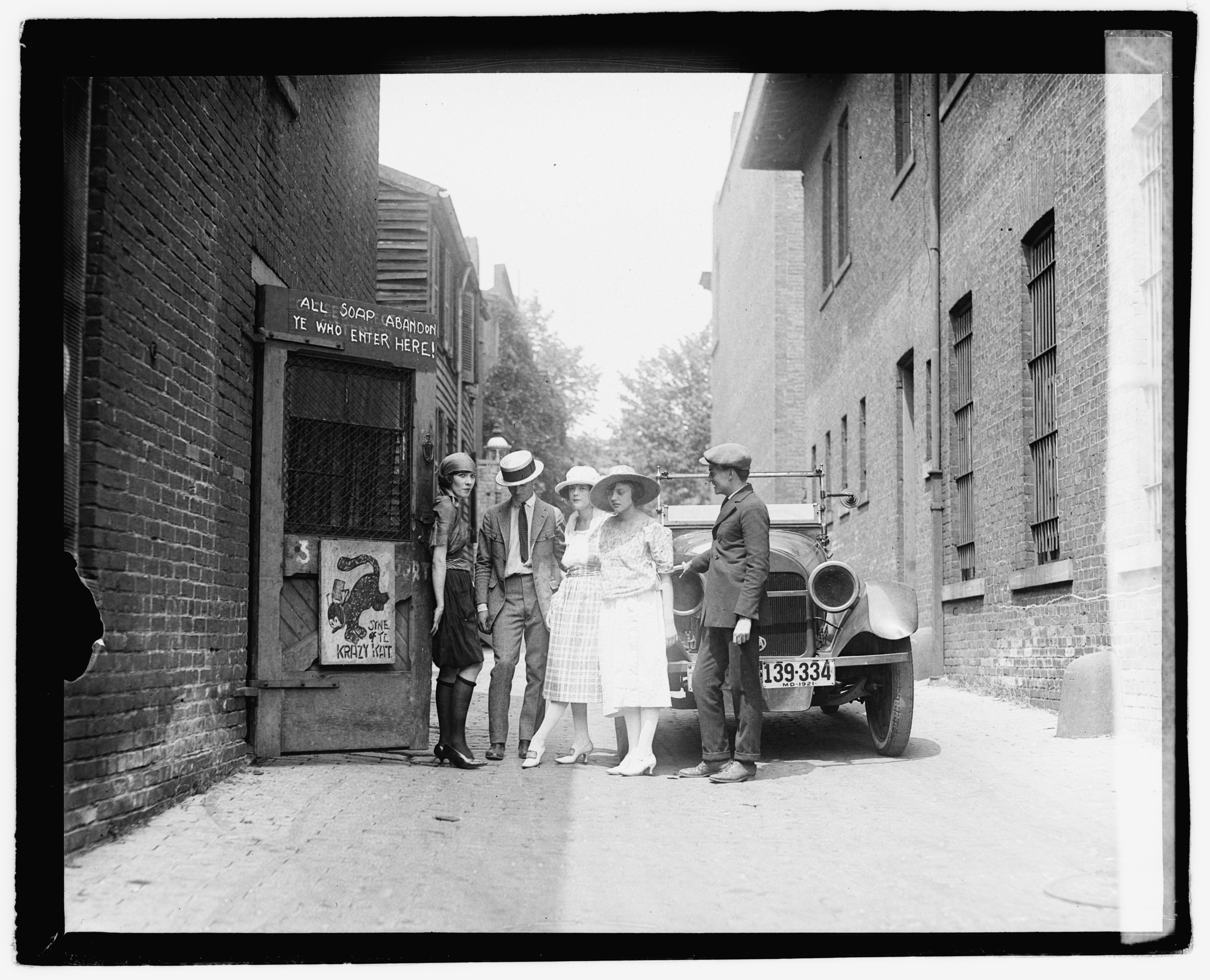
Patrons await the opening of the Krazy Kat Klub, a Speakeasy, 1921

speakeasy

Illegal establishment selling liquor or Illegal liquor purveyor; see blind pig, bootleg tiger
special
Newspaper extra purporting to contain fresh news
speed
Class, pep, ritziest, pace, go
spell
An indefinite period; a turn of duty relieving another
spellbinder
A popular orator or demagog, a blah tossed, a bull artist
spick and span
Brand new
spicy
Pungent, tart, risqué, racy
spiel, speel
To talk longwindedly
spifflicated
Alternate names for intoxicated; see § drunk
spiffed, spiflicated
Drunk
spiffy
1. Elegant appearance; smart; fashionable
2. Ritzy, classy, up to snuff
spill

Talk, inform; tell everything one knows
spill the beans
To reveal a secret
spinach
1. Money
2. nonsense, worthless matter
spitter
Mouth, as in "a biff on the spitter"
splash
Dash, display
spliced, to be or get
To get married
splurge
Display; sensation; fuss
spoils
Political patronage; hence, spoilsman
spondulix
Money
sponge
Drunkard, hard drinker; to act as parasite
spoof
A deception, swindle, hoax
spoon
1. To flirt with, bill and coo hence spoony, to get spoons on
2. To neck, or talk of love; flirtation
sport
A cheap flashy person
sport, a good
One who'll do what the party does; a woman operating under blue-sky laws
spout
To talk voluminously; to emit blah
spout, up the
Everything in a bad way
spread
A meal, an elaborate meal
spread-eagle-ism
Bombastic praise of this country
spunk
Courage, mettle, guts
squab
A fat short person; a woman; a youngster
square
1. Satisfactory, honest
2. Honest; regular man or women; respectable, upright
square deal
Honest dealing; what people promise to do
square meal
A complete repast
squatter
One who settles on land without right
squeak
A hairbreadth; the least margin
squeal
To betray a plot or accomplice; to inform
squeeze

1. Female companion or girlfriend; lover; sweetheart; see main squeeze
2. To compel to pay tribute to; to extort
squirm
To escape by awkward evasion
squirrel
Hide
squirrel-food or feed
A nut, loon, simpleton, crazy person
squirt
A brainless conceited person
squirt metal
Shoot bullets

Example
I jammed the roscoe in his button and said, "Close your yap, bo, or I squirt metal."

— In his article for the Ottawa Citizen, William Denton mentioned Sam Spade, the famous detective character from Dashiell Hammett's works, quoting him as saying:

stag
A man without a woman at a dance
stager, an old
An old egg, person of long experience
stall
To evade in talk; to postpone a debt; stick in mud or snow
star
One who plays a leading part
static
Conflicting opinion; difficulties, impudent; argumentative talk
statts
Conversation that means nothing
steam-roller
Overrunning opposition by roughhouse tactics
steep
Exorbitant, expensive
step off
1. To be executed; die
2. To get married
step off a wharf
Ordering drinks and then refusing to pay the bill
step on the gas
Speed it
step out
To go out all dressed up
stew
Mental disturbance hence stewed, stewed to the gills; drunk
stick, a poor
An unsatisfactory sweetie, a flat tire
sticks, in the
In the backwoods
stiff

1. Corpse, dead human body
2. Drunk passed out cold
stilts
Legs
sting

Culmination of a con game; swindle
stink
A disagreeable exposure
stinker
A rotter, a disliked person
stool pigeon

1. Informer; see canary
2. A planted informer; a gambling den decoy
stoolie

Stool-pigeon; criminal informer
stork
A long-legged bird, purveying all human babies in the united states; the cabbage and rose bush methods have become slightly obscene; the biological is verboten; the stork, Santa Claus, and Yahweh
stovepipe hat
High silk hat
straddle
To pose on both sides of a question
straight goods
The undiluted truth
strangler
What a spendthrift isn't
strap-hanger
Passengers permitted by public service corporations to exercise their clinging muscles instead of their sedentary anatomy
strawberry, blonde
Carrot-top; red haired woman
streeted
Thrown out of a party
strike breaker
Young woman who goes with her friend's "steady" while there is a coolness
stuck on, to be
1. To be fond of
2. You have a crush on someone
stuck up
Conceited, vain
struggle
Modern dance
struggle buggy
Backseat of a car; Parent's worst nightmare
stutter bus
Truck
stutter-tub
Motor boat
sucker

1. Someone who is vulnerable to being swindled by a scam artist
2. One easily imposed upon
sugar
Flattering words; money, as in "a sugar-coated papa"
sugar daddy

Older boyfriend who showers girlfriend with gifts
swag
Stolen goods, loot
swanky
Good, Elegant, Ritzy
sweet on, to be
To be fond of
sweet tooth
A liking for sweets
sweetie, sweetums, sweet stuff
1. One beloved or favored
2. Anybody she hates
sweeten the pot
To enlarge one's holdings
swell
Great
swim, in the
In company with; in the current of popular fashions
swindler(s)

Individual(s) who deceive with the intention of stealing money or possessions from others
swing
To manage successfully
swipe
To steal, especially a cheap article

== T ==
table, to go to the
To partake of the Christian communion; formerly of bread and wine, since the Volstead act of uneeda biscuits or zuzus, and Canada dry, cherry Ola, Coca-Cola, or cherry smash
tacky
Neglected, shabby, unkempt
taffy
Sweet words, blarney, flattery
tail
Shadow or follow
take a bent stick
Instead of hoping for a perfect partner, a woman who may not be easily marriageable should consider settling for a loyal elderly admirer
take a powder
Leave; depart hastily
take a shine to
Take a liking to
take after
Resemble
take for a ride
Transport someone to an isolated area with the intention of killing them
taken in, to be
To be deceived
take it from me
Believe me
take of
To imitate or mimic
take on
1. Get excited or hysteric over
2. Eat
take the air
1. Go about one's business
2. Leave
take the bounce
To get kicked out
take the ball and run
1. Carry on with an activity or process initiated by someone else, usually when they were unable to complete or succeed at it; also run with the ball
2. Taking an opportunity and following it
take the cake
Win, as at a cakewalk
take the fall for
Endure punishment, blame, criticism, or even arrest for the actions of someone else, perhaps knowingly; Getting arrested for a specific crime, particularly when others are not held accountable for committing the same crime
talent, the
Persons in a profession
talk big
To boast
talk turkey
To talk business
tall timber, the
The sticks; the backwoods
tank
Heavy drinker, sponge
tanked
Alternate names for intoxicated; see § drunk
tanktown
One horse burg, jerkwater town
tart
A daughter of joy, a harlot, girl on the turf
tasty
Appealing; sexually alluring
tb
Consumption, tuberculosis
tea
1. Marijuana
2. Whisky
tea fight
Tea-party, muffin-worry
teach one's grandmother to suck eggs
To lecture one's elders
tear
Boisterous spree; "on a tear"
tearjerker

It's a tear-inducing performance in a film, novel, song, or opera that evokes strong emotions; a fomenter of pathos
teetotaler

Individual who refrains from consuming any form of alcohol
tell it to sweeney
Expressing skepticism by dismissing a previous unrealistic claim
ten cent box
Taxi cab; see hack
ten strike
A complete victory
tenderfoot
A greenhorn, easterner, in the west
tenderloin
Choicest section of a city, in which theatres, gambling dens, etc.
the advantage bulls
Plainclothes railroad cops
the money man
Man with the bankroll
the nuts
Good!
the real mccoy

The genuine thing, neither a substitute nor an imitation
they
Refers to objecting parents
thing, the
The proper or fashionable thing
think, I don't
Negatives what precedes: "you're a gentleman, I don't think!"
third degree
Illegal police method of extorting lies, faked confessions, etc.
three letter man
Homosexual
three-spot
Three-year jail term
throw lead
Shoot bullets
ticket
Private Investigator License (PI)
tickled to death, to be
To be highly pleased
tie, can you tie that?
Can you equal that
tiger milk
Some sort of liquor
tight
1. Close, stingy; drunk
2. Attractive
tighten the screws
To forcefully pressure someone through coercion, force, or violent threats
tile loose, to have a
To be crazy
tin
Police officers badge
tin lizzie, tin lizard, tincan, flivver, henry
A ford
tin pan alley

Music industry in New York, located between 48th and 52nd streets
tincan tourist, tincanner, tin can town or city
Ford tourists, living in a flivver there and here
tip a few
Have a few drinks
toad-eater
Fawning parasite, sycophant, lickspittle
toddle
A dance; to depart, as toddle along
toddler
Related to someone who shows up once everything has already been paid for; see finale hopper
tom, dick, and harry
Any of a crowd; people at large
tomato
Attractive woman or Good looking girl with no brains
toodle-dy-oo, toodle-oo
Goodbye
tooting The Wrong Ringer
Asking the wrong person
tophole
The acme of perfection
torpedo(s)

Hired thug or hitman
toss or toss up
An even chance
toss and hike
Decide to pursue a new girl and reject the current one
tote, tote a gun, tote fair
To carry
touch
To borrow
trail, to hit the
To be converted by a vulgar evangelist
train with
To go with a person
trap

Mouth
trigger man
Man whose job is to use a gun
trip for biscuits
Wild goose chase
tripe
Blah, flapdoodle, nonsense
trot along
Depart
trottery
Dance hall; where shimmy, etc., is danced
trotzky
Mature woman with facial hair
trouble boys
Groups of young men known for causing mischief or getting into minor legal troubles
tumble to
To understand
tum-tum, tuh-tuh
The stomach
turn up
Give up or turn in to law enforcement officers
twaddle, twattle
Idle chatter, piffle, bibblebabble
twist

Woman
two bits

Twenty-five cents ($.25) or Twenty-five dollars ($25)

== U ==
uncle
A pawnbroker; uncle Sam
under glass
In jail
unreal
Special
unwritten law
Illegal custom allowing a man to bump off his wife's pal, or a woman to poke off her hubby's lady charitable
up and doing
Energetic, go-getting
up and down
Gazing intently at someone
up the flue, flume, or spout
Gone flooey; ruined
upchuck

Vomit, yak, spew, especially after consuming too much Giggle juice
upper crust
The so-called aristocratic class
upper story
Vacant part of a house; the brain
uppers
To be in financial despair; see shatting on your uppers
upstage
Snotty, snobbish
urban set
New gown

== V ==
v or v spot
A five dollar bill
vacuum
Entire void, especially mental
vag
Vagrancy; Homelessness
vamoose
To leave pronto or quickly
vamp, vampire
1. Female seducer of men; Aggressive female flirt
2. Seductress, a Theda
virgin
A girl with a presbyterian reputation; somewhat out of date
voot
Money

== W ==
wad, wad of dough
Money collectively
wages of sin
The price paid for breaking a divine or moral law; usually affluence, public esteem, success, and· a marble mausoleum; unless the infraction has been picayune
walk in
Party crasher
walking delegate
Business agent of a labor union; the representative of capital rides
walkover
An easy or unopposed success
wallop(s)
1. A heavy blow, punch; thrash e.g. he gave him a mighty wallop
2. Emotional impact; emotionally excited reaction; psychological force e.g. that film has some serious wallop

Example
. . . where Nazimova comes to a house of refuge, not knowing that Sills is there, and is pronounced dying by physicians, but is saved by Sills' prayer. To us who make and sell pictures, this "saved by prayer" situation registers as hokum, but just the same it has a genuine wallop for most of your customers, and consequently this final sequence effectively tops a very good red meat dramatic yarn.

— 1924 Wid's Movie Review

warm
Heated with passion; as, warm member, warm baby
waster
A person who wastes or lavishly spends money; wastrel

Example
In the park awaiting her train home she meets Forrest Chenoworth, a rich idler, whose money has gotten him into trouble with a lady named Jane. . . The alderman's son, a waster, is acquainted with Jane

— 1920 Wid's Daily Movie Review

watch your step
Watch out
water-proof
Face that doesn't require make-up
weak end
The brain
weak sister
1. A pepless dame
2. Push-over
weaker sex or vessel
Used by men to describe women
wear iron
Carry a gun
weasel
1. Young man who steals a girl from her boyfriend
2. Informer; squeals; see Canary
Weepie

Film designed to elicit a tearful emotional response from its audience; Sad or sentimental film, often portraying troubled romance; see tear jerker
weeping willow
1. Pessimist; one who doubts; see crepehanger;
2. See killjoy; wet blanket
wet
1. Place where liquor is available or person who is in favor of legal alcohol sales i.e. against prohibition
2. Incorrect, mistaken e.g. you're all wet (1920)
wet blanket
Person who spoils a fun moment i.e. Killjoy

Example
I am a one-sided person—what you call, perhaps, a wet blanket. I don't smoke, I don't drink, I don't gamble, I don't dance. I like my home. I do not like boldness, lack of restraint.

— 1923 Photoplay interview of Joseph Schildkraut

whaled
Heavy drinker who is drunk
whangdoodle

1. Jazz music
2. A mythical creature, akin to the gymnascutus, legs shorter on one side than the other, to let him feed on a hillside; nonsense
what's eating you?
What's currently irritating or troubling you? e.g. You seem to be in a sour mood today, What's eating you?
what's What
The real or genuine thing
whiskbroom
A man who cultivates whiskers
white collar slave
The class of clerks, as opposed to class-conscious labor
white lightning

Moonshine; inferior whiskey e.g., they had a pint of bootleg white lighting
white mule, white lightning
Greased lightning, mountain dew, or corn; illegal liquor
white stuff
1. Morphine
2. Grain alcohol used for making bootleg liquor
whoopee
1. Boisterous, convivial fun; wild celebration
2. Having fun had with a romantic partner; making whoopee i.e. having sexual intercourse
whopper jawed
Crazy
wicked
Skilled; as, shake a wicked leg or limb
wiff
The wife, the missus, the better two-thirds
wild to
Anxious or crazy to
willies, the
The jimjams, blues, feeling of dislike
windsucker
Braggart
wise guy
Smart aleck; individual who is showy and arrogantly knowledgeable
wise Head
Smart person
wise to be
To have a good understanding e.g. put us wise
wiseacre
A know-it-all
wobbly
Member of the iww, the "industrial workers of the world"
wooden kimono
Coffin
woof! woof!
Ridicule
wop

Derogatory term for an Italian; term means without papers
worker
Woman who takes a guy for his money e.g. She Sizes Up As A Worker
wow
A knockout, great success
wrestle
Dance variant of Shimmy dance
wrinkle
1. Girl's mother
2. A smart dodge, a new trick
write-up
Laudatory story for the press
wrong box, wrong pew, in the
In a false predicament or wrong place
wrong guy
A person who is incompetent and untrustworthy; criminal; also wrong gee, wrong ghee, wrong Injun
wrong number
Not a good fellow; dangerous person
wrong person
Used in secretive conversations to indicate a mistake in identity, especially in dealings that required discretion
wurp
socially inadequate; see Killjoy

== Y ==
ya follow
Do you understand?
yap

1. Mouth
2. To make noise; a hick, countryman
yard
One hundred dollars ($100)
yegg, yeggman
A traveling safe-blower
yegg

Safecracker who can only open cheap and easy safes; supposedly named after john yegg, first criminal to use nitroglycerin to crack a safe to break open a safe
yen
opium
yellow
Cowardly; sensational, as yellow journalism
yellowback
Various dominations of U.S. dollar having a yellow-colored back e.g. Out West during the Civil War California used currencies with yellowback, while out East, they used greenbacks
Yenshee
Opium; see yen
Yenshee baby
Opium addict
you slay me!
That's so funny; also you kill me

== Z ==
zero
A dud, an absolute blank mentally
zip
Speed; hence, zippy
zotzed
Individual is murdered
zozzled
Alternate names for intoxicated; see § drunk

== See also ==
- Art Deco
- Glossary of Mafia-related words
- Jazz Age
- List of 1920s jazz standards
- List of police-related slang terms
- List of ethnic slurs
- Prohibition in the United States
- Roaring Twenties
- Slang dictionary

== Works cited ==
Books

- Chapman, Robert L (1987). American Slang. New York, New York: Harper & Row. p. 499. ISBN 0-06-096160-0. "Abridged edition of the New Dictionary of American Slang"
- Dalzell, T. (2012). Flappers 2 Rappers: American Youth Slang. Dover Publications. ISBN 978-0-486-12162-8. "Unabridged copy of 1996 Meriam-Webster publication of the same name"
- Geneviene, T.R. (2018). Speak Flapper: Slang of the 1920s. ISBN 978-1-6561-6855-9.
- Green, Jonathon (2008). Chambers Slang Dictionary (1st ed.). London: Chambers. p. 1477. ISBN 978-0550-10563-9.
- Kipfer, Barbara Ann; Chapman, Robert L. (2007). The Dictionary of American Slang (4th ed.). New York: HarperCollins publisher. p. 592. ISBN 978-0-06-117646-3.
- LeFurgy, Bill (2019). Criminal Slang: Annotated Edition of the 1908 Dictionary of the Vernacular of the Underworld. High Kicker Books. p. 110. ISBN 978-1-7345678-2-3. "contents of original Joseph Sullivan's criminal slang: a dictionary of the vernacular of the underworld, first published by the detective pub company in 1908 and edited by Bill LeFurgy."
- Lighter, J.E. (1994). Random House Historical Dictionary of American Slang: A-G (1st ed.). New York, New York: Random House. p. 1006. ISBN 0-394-54427-7.
- Lighter, J.E. (1997). Random House Historical Dictionary of American Slang: H-O (1st ed.). New York, New York: Random House. p. 736. ISBN 0-679-43464-X.
- McClure's Magazine (1917). McClure's Magazine. S.S. McClure, Limited. p. 62.
- Mitchell, C.R. (2019). 1920s Slang Dictionary (in Tagalog). Independently Published. ISBN 978-1-0728-6161-4.
- Partridge, Eric (1984). A Dictionary of Slang and Unconventional English: Colloquialisms and Catch-phrases, Solecisms and Catachreses, Nicknames, Vulgarisms (8th ed.). New York, New York: Macmilan Publishing Company. p. 1400. ISBN 0-02-594980-2.
- Tradii, Joe (2018). From Ameche to Zozzled: A Glossary of Hard-Boiled Slang of the 1920s Through The 1940s. Amazon Digital Services LLC – Kdp. ISBN 978-1-9833-4745-0. "Glossary of Hard-Boiled slang of the 1920s through the 1940s"
- Wood, Clement; Goddard, Gloria (1926). A Dictionary of American Slang. Little Blue Book No. 56. Girard, Kansas: Haldeman-Julius.

Web Slang Dictionaries and PDFs

- "Slang of the 1920". local.aaca.org. Archived from the original on June 18, 2010.
- Beard, Robert. "A Historical Dictionary of American Slang". alphadictionary.com.
- "Green's Dictionary of Slang". 2024. "Green's Dictionary of Slang is the largest historical dictionary of English slang"
- Historical Dictionary of American Slang (this version)
- Online Etymology Dictionary
- "Dictionaries". An Encyclopædia Britannica Company.
- "Time Traveler". An Encyclopædia Britannica Company.
- "Dictionaries and Works Cited: Dictionary of Newfoundland English". Heritage.nf.ca.
- Serrani, Alyssa (December 13, 2021). "Comeback-Worthy 1920s Slang That Only Rag-a-Muffins Won't Appreciate". YourDictionary.
- "Thesaurus and word tools for your creative needs". WordHippo. February 19, 2009.
- "1920's Slang". huffenglish.com.
- Wiktionary – a free standard dictionary
- "Slang of the 1920's" (PDF). center.uoregon.edu. University of Oregon. 2024. "Slang of the 1920's The twenties were the first decade to emphasize youth culture over the older generations, and the flapper sub-culture had a tremendous influence on mainstream America; many new words and phrases were coined by these liberated women. Many of these are still used today!"
- "slang_of_the_1920s.pdf" (PDF).

Websites

- Brockway, Laura Hale (March 25, 2021). "phrases from the 1920s". PR Daily.
- "1920s Slang". Smoky Hill Museum. 2024.
- "1920s and 1930s Slang Dictionary". Orlando Dinner Show.
- "1920s Slang". Lighthouse Translations. February 5, 2024.
- "Learn 1920s Speakeasy Prohibition Slang!". Shot In The Dark Mysteries Murder. February 6, 2011.
- "The LSC After Dark Guide to 1920s Slang". Liberty Science Center. November 15, 2016.
- Ross, Scott (2013). "Early 20th Century American Slang". Reader's Digest.
- Smith, Sam Benson (September 10, 2019). "30 Slang Words from the 1920s That Are Worth Bringing Back". Reader's Digest.
