= Chicago Express Loop =

Proposed privately funded urban rail transit rapid transit system

The Chicago Express Loop was a proposed privately funded urban rail transit rapid transit system that would have used underground high-speed rail to connect the Chicago Loop to O'Hare International Airport from Block 37. The line was to be constructed by Elon Musk's the Boring Company. It was claimed the Boring Company would pay the costs for the construction of the system in exchange for the rights to the future transit fees as well as advertisement, branding and in-vehicle sales revenues. Chicago Express Loop was the official name of the plan.

The plans "never moved forward after initial excitement." The project died after Chicago mayor Rahm Emanuel, whose term ended in May 2019, decided not to pursue another term as mayor.

== History ==
In May 2017, The Boring Company first became linked to the plan and made an official bid for the project in November 2017. The vision for electric pod transport goes back to 2017 tweets by Musk. The city's original request for proposal sought bids to bring the travel time from the loop to O'Hare below 20 minutes with departure frequencies of less than 15 minutes and fees that were lower than taxi and ridesharing company fares. The Boring Company was announced as the winning bid on June 13, 2018.

Musk had previously applied to build a 2.7-mile (4.3 km) tunnel linking Los Angeles to Culver City as a "proof of process" for the technology. At the time of their bid, the Boring Company had received approval to link Washington, D.C., and Baltimore using this technology; that project was also never completed.

== Proposed system ==
The proposed system was to use 16-passenger self-driving vehicles built on Tesla chassis, departing as often as every 30 seconds. The proposed vehicles would move through tunnels at speeds as high as 150 miles per hour on a concrete track and complete the journey in 12 minutes, which was 3 to 4 times faster than existing alternatives such as the Chicago Transit Authority Blue Line. The proposed vehicles were referred to as skates and are based on the Tesla Model X. The vehicles would cover an 18-mile (29 km) track with eight guiding wheels, including four traditional grounded wheels and four additional side wheels. The fares were expected to be approximately $25.

== Criticism ==
The Loop's projected cost of $1 billion, or $55.5 million per mile) was derided by transportation scholars and journalists as being too low by at least a factor of 10 for its scale. The city's aldermen also raised concerns about project oversight and risk, fearing that public funds could be used to cover cost overruns.

After the failure of the Chicago project, proponents have pointed to lower per-mile baseline costs in realized Boring Company developments. For instance, the 1.7-mile Las Vegas Convention Center (LVCC) Loop was completed in 2021 $27.6 million per mile. Later company proposals and filings, such as those for the Music City Loop in Nashville, projected construction costs between $12 million and $15 million per tunnel mile.
