= Dubai Loop =

Car tunnel system project in the UAE

The Dubai Loop is a car tunnel system project that aims to serve Downtown Dubai. It was first announced in February 2025. Construction started in February 2026. It is built by The Boring Company. The system will use Tesla Model Y vehicles to shuttle passengers.

The first phase of the project will cover 6.4 kilometres (4.0 mi), comprising four stations (Dubai International Financial Centre, ICD Brookfield Place, Zaabeel Dubai Mall Parking, and Burj Khalifa/Dubai Mall), transporting 13,000 passengers per day and shortening the travel time between DIFC and Dubai Mall from 20 to 3 minutes. It is expected to be launched by 2027. The second phase will feature 19 stations across 22.2 kilometres (13.8 mi), connecting Dubai World Trade Centre to Business Bay. It is planned to be built within three years and handle 30,000 passengers per day.

== See also ==
- Transport in Dubai
- Vegas Loop
- Music City Loop
- Tunnel construction
- Gadgetbahn
