= Hawthorne Municipal Airport (California) =

Municipal airport near Hawthorne, Los Angeles County, CA, USA

Hawthorne Municipal Airport Jack Northrop Field
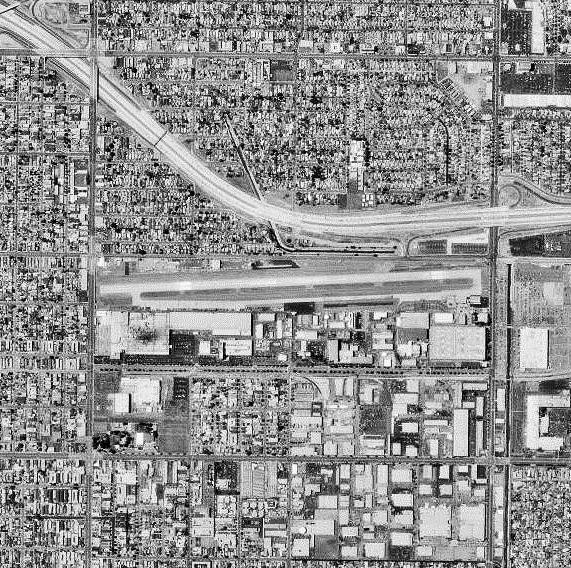
- 1994 USGS photo
- IATA: HHR; ICAO: KHHR; FAA LID: HHR

Summary
- Airport type: Public
- Owner: City of Hawthorne
- Operator: Archer Aviation Inc.
- Serves: Greater Los Angeles
- Location: Hawthorne, California
- Elevation AMSL: 66 ft (20 m)
- Coordinates: 33°55′22″N 118°20′07″W
- Website: cityofhawthorne.org/departments/public-works/airport

Maps
- FAA airport diagram
- Location HHR (the United States)

Runways
| Direction | Length | | Surface |
| Direction | ft | m | Surface |
|---|---|---|---|
| 7/25 | 4,884 | 1,489 | Concrete |

Hawthorne Municipal Airport (IATA: HHR, ICAO: KHHR) (also known as Jack Northrop Field) is a public use airport in Hawthorne, California, United States. US air taxi firm Archer Aviation signed a long-term lease to develop a base for urban air mobility and plans to use it as a base for passenger-carrying operations for the 2028 Summer Olympics.

== History ==
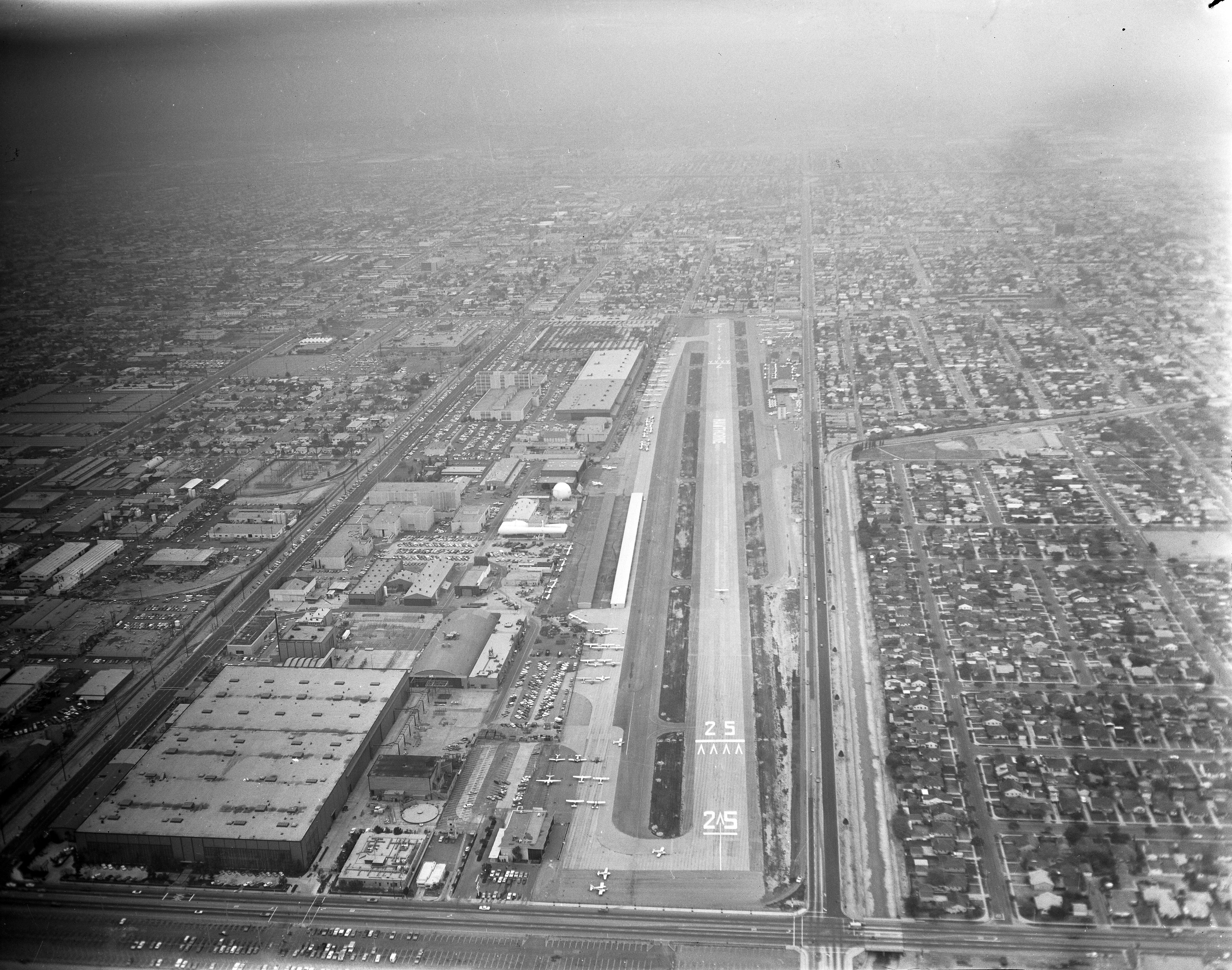
Aerial view of the Hawthorne Municipal Airport in 1972

The name Jack Northrop Field came from the Northrop Aircraft Corporation, founded by Jack Northrop, which for years designed, built and flew many classic airplanes including YB-35 flying wing, the P-61 Black Widow and F-89 Scorpion night fighters, the F-5 Freedom Fighter, and the T-38 Talon jet trainer.

During World War II, the airfield was used by the United States Army Air Forces Air Technical Service Command as an aircraft modification center and Air Transport Command to ferry new aircraft to operational units.

SpaceX and its spinoff The Boring Company originally were headquartered at the southeast end of the airport, and continue to have operations there. The Boring Test Tunnel runs just under the fence line at the north-east corner before running under West 120th Street. The Tesla Design Studio is located at the airport as well.

US air taxi firm Archer Aviation acquired the master ground lease for the airport from the city of Hawthorne in November 2025 for $126 million. The electric aircraft manufacturer will operate the airport while using it as their operational hub for the Los Angeles area. Archer will use the airport for testing of its aircraft with the possibility of creating an urban air mobility base for multiple air taxi companies. Archer will use it as a base for passenger-carrying operations in the Los Angeles area during the 2028 Summer Olympics.

== Facilities ==
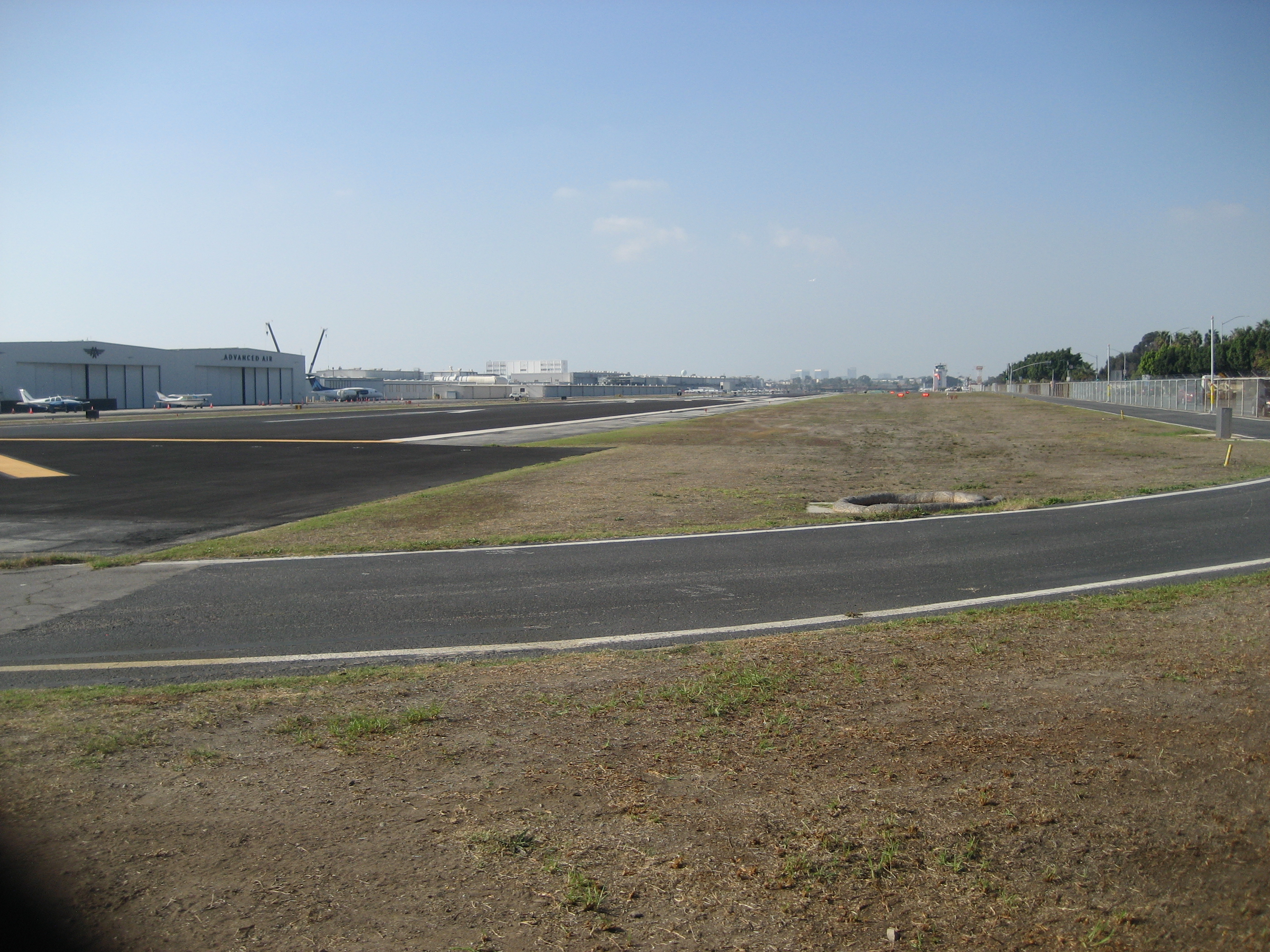
Ground view of the Hawthorne Municipal Airport

The airport covers 80 acres (32 ha); its one runway, 7/25, is 4,884 ft × 100 ft (1,489 m × 30 m) concrete. It is effectively crammed into a very small space and is surrounded by residential areas on all sides. The airport is also in very close proximity to the considerably larger Los Angeles International Airport, so special consideration must be given attention to avoid encroaching on the LAX airspace.

There is one fixed-base operator (FBO) at the airport, Jet Center Los Angeles, a subsidiary of Advanced Air. There is also one other aviation related business on the airfield, Star Helicopters.

== Airlines and destinations ==
| Airlines | Destinations | Refs |
|---|---|---|
| Advanced Air | Crescent City, Imperial/El Centro; Seasonal: Mammoth Lakes | |

== Statistics ==
=== Top domestic destinations ===
Busiest domestic routes from HHR (September 2025 – August 2026)
| Rank | City | Passengers | Carriers |
|---|---|---|---|
| 1 | Merced, California | 2,480 | Advanced |
| 2 | Mammoth Lakes, California | 1,660 | Advanced |
| 3 | Crescent City, California | 1,590 | Advanced |

== Ground transportation ==
Crenshaw station on the C Line of the Los Angeles Metro Rail system is walking distance from the airport. Several Metro bus lines also run along Crenshaw Boulevard.

== Accidents ==
- On March 21, 2016, at 12:01 pm an Airborne XT-912, an ultralight trike, crashed into an airport fence the roadway beyond it shortly after taking off from the airport. A DHC-6 Twin Otter landed ahead of the trike, forty seconds before it began its takeoff roll. The National Transportation Safety Board (NTSB) determined the trike pilot did not wait long enough for the wake turbulence to dissipate, which sent the trike into an unrecoverable roll to the right too close to the ground. The trike pilot, the sole occupant, was a student and likely inadequately trained on the hazards of wake turbulence. There was one fatality.
- On October 4, 2020, at 9:35 am an Evolution Revo, an ultralight trike, crashed into terrain shortly after taking off from the airport. The NTSB determined the trike pilot most likely made incorrect control inputs while turning away from the airport. The pilot, the sole occupant, was the only fatality.

== See also ==
- California World War II Army Airfields
