= Transport in Dubai =

The Roads & Transport Authority (RTA) was formed by the decree number 17 for the year 2005.

RTA is responsible for planning and providing the requirements of transport, roads & traffic in the Emirate of Dubai, and between Dubai and other Emirates of the UAE, neighboring countries in order to provide an effective & integrated transport system.

== Roads ==
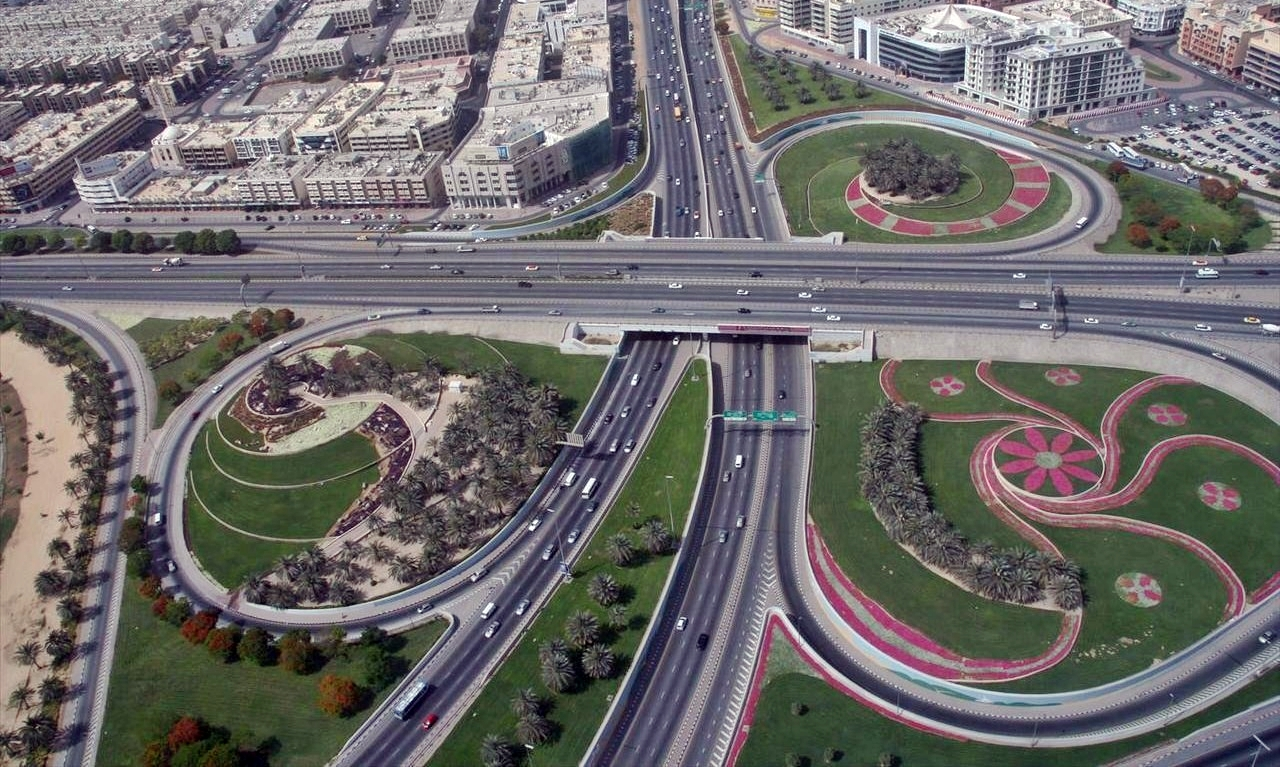
A Dubai interchange

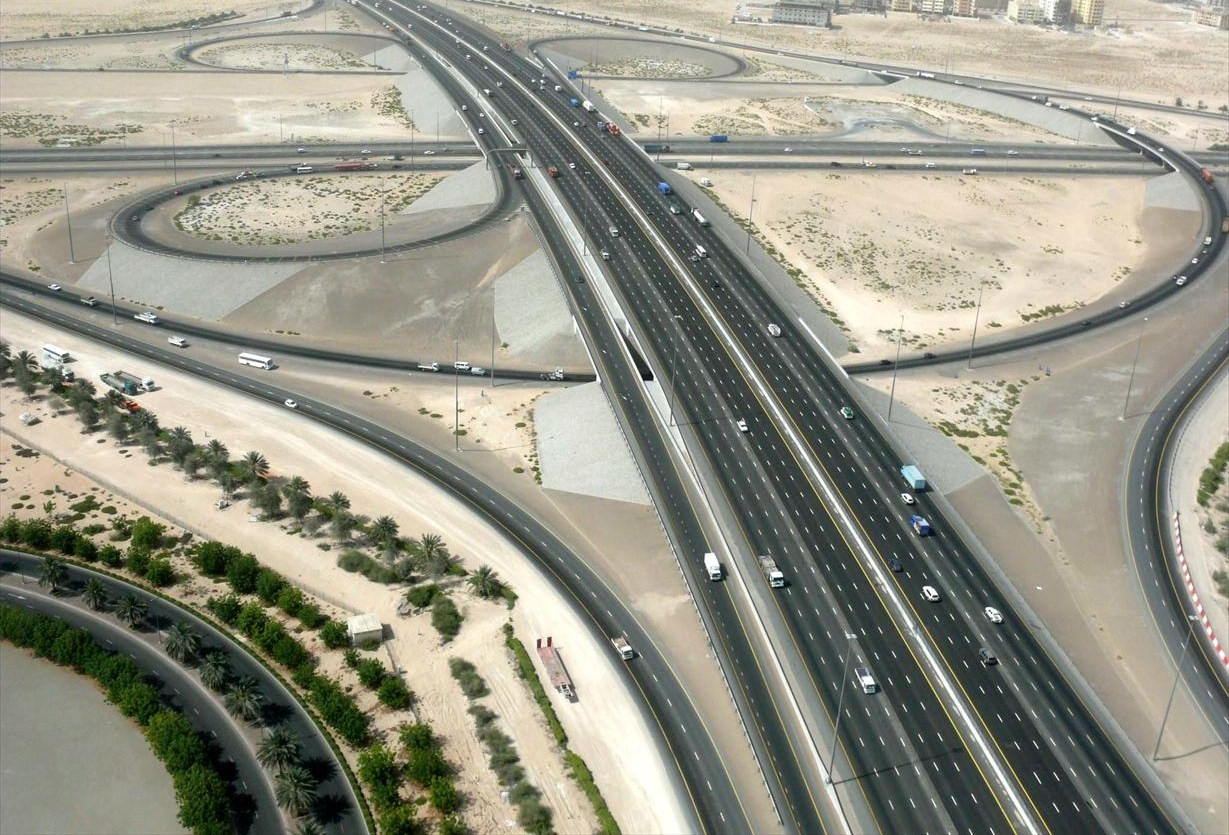
The interchange between E 311 and E 66

Because of the growing population, commuters in Dubai experience a high amount of traffic congestion. The city has become the most congested city in the Middle East.

Professionals working in Dubai spend an average of 1 hour and 45 minutes commuting to and from work. The government has invested heavily in the Dubai's road infrastructure, although this has not kept pace with the increase in the number of vehicles. This, coupled with the induced traffic phenomenon, has led to growing problems of congestion.

Traffic congestion, the single biggest concern among Dubai's 1.44 million residents, inflicts losses of Dh4.6 billion or 3.15% of the emirate's Dh146 billion GDP a year. The city has a car ownership rate of 541 cars per 1,000 population. This figure exceeds that of cities like New York City [444 cars per 1,000 population], London [345 cars per 1,000 population] and Singapore [111 cars per 1,000 population]. Now in 2026, there are 2.5 Million cars registered in Dubai.

As of 2026, more than 634km of road & 72 major bridges and 17 tunnels are planned to be constructed before 2029 at a cost of around 16 billion dirhams ($4.36 billion) as RTA provides a better life for commuters.

== Taxis ==
Dubai also has an extensive taxi system, the most expensive way to travel around the Emirate. There are both government-operated and private cab companies. The Dubai Transport Corporations operates cream-color taxis (Red Roofs), with different color tops representing different franchising companies operating under RTA regulations. Some of the private cab companies are Kabi Taxi (Blue / Purple Roof), National Taxi (Yellow Roof), Atabia Taxi (Green Roof) and Metro Taxi (Orange Roof). The meter generally begins as Dhs.12.00 when a requesting a cab from the call center, and 5.00 Dhs. when taking a taxi on the road and is generally charged by distance at 1.5 Dhs./km. The minimum fare charge depends it can be either 8.00 or 12.00 AED. There are approximately 9,497 taxis as per October 2015 located in the city. These cabs are available via the three major taxi booking apps - Uber, Careem and Dubai Taxi. With Careem being the largest taxi operator. (DTC).

== Dubai Metro ==
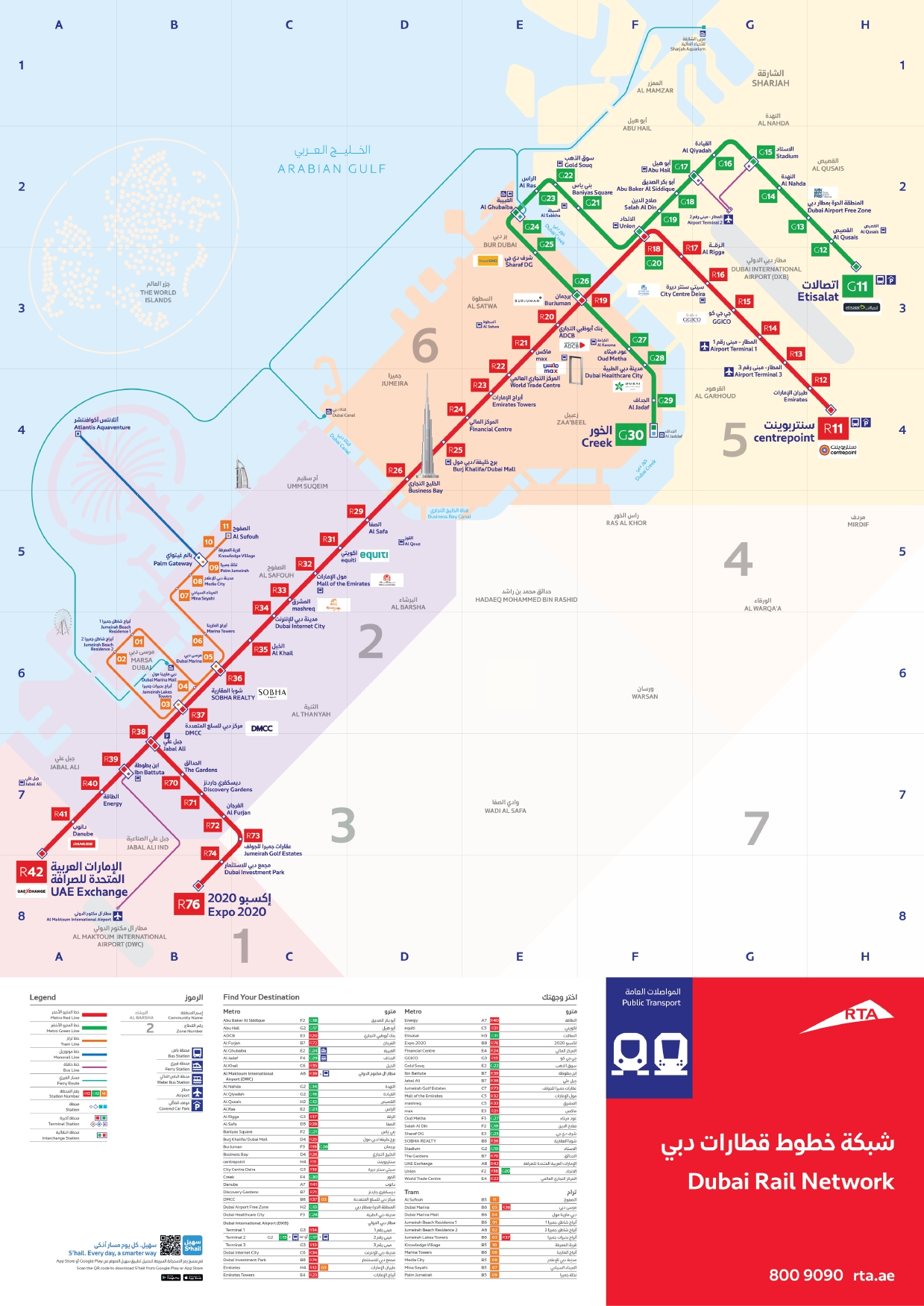
Route Map of Dubai Metro

The Dubai Metro currently operates two lines. The construction contract for the project was given to Dubai Rapid Link (DURL), a consortium led by Mitsubishi Heavy Industries, in 2005. The construction of the red line began in September 2005 and the red line started operating on 9 September 2009, with its extension opened in 2010, 2013 and 2021. There are currently 31 stations on the red line. The construction of green line started in 2006 and the green line opened on 9 September 2011. There were initially 18 stations and two more stations were added in 2014. The Green Line runs from Etisalat by e& to Creek and the Red Line from Centrepoint to Expo 2020 and the Red Branch Line runs from Jabal Ali to UAE Exchange

As of 2026, the Blue Line is being built, scheduled for completion for 2029. The Gold Line has been confirmed, scheduled for 2032.

Currently, the total length of the metro system is 89.6 km, within which 13 km is built underground.

Seven monorails are also slated to be constructed to help feed the Dubai Metro, connecting various places such as Dubailand, the Palm Jumeirah and other districts the main track. The first of these, the Palm Jumeirah Monorail, opened on 30 April 2009. Four stations are in operation (Palm Gateway, Ittihad Park, Nakheel Mall, The Pointe (Shut Down On July 31, 2023, & Atlantis Aquaventure), with no stations being planned in the future.

== Bus ==
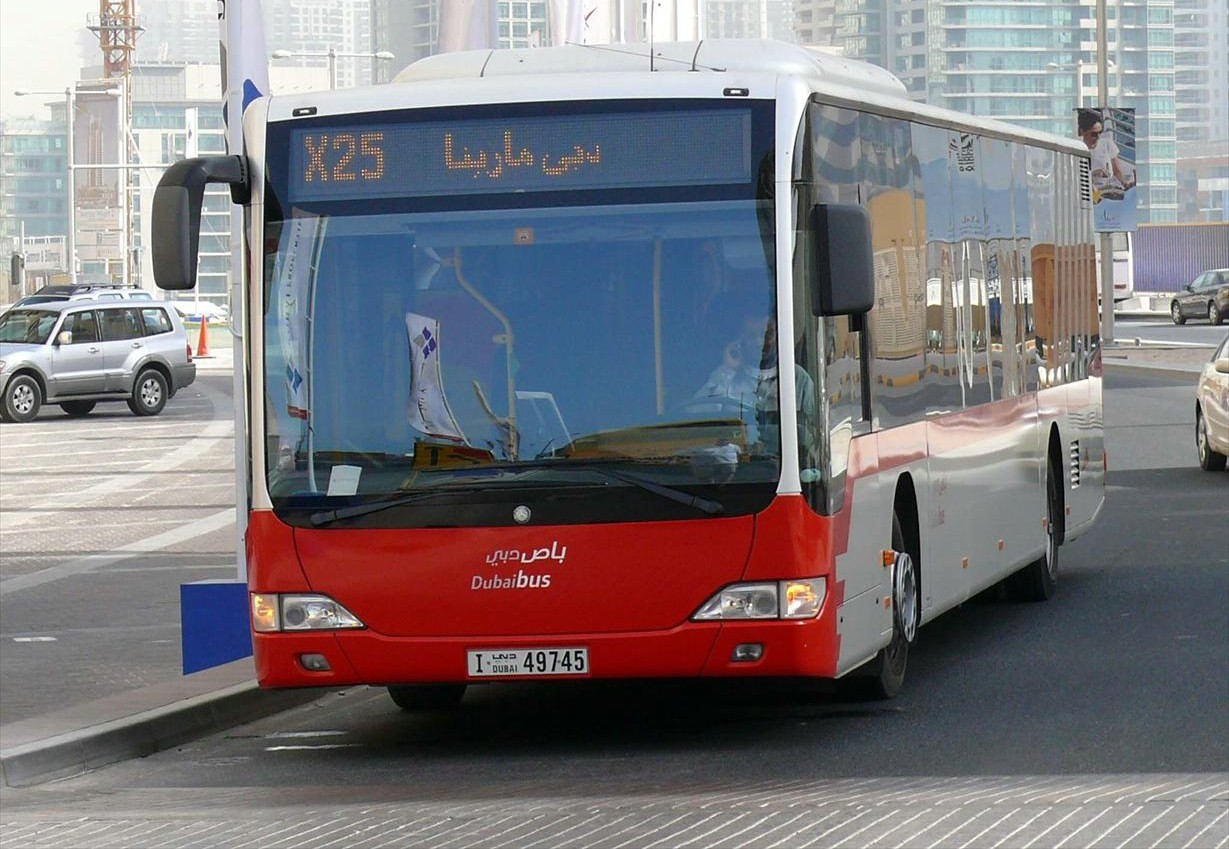
A Roads & Transport Authority Mercedes-Benz Citaro

Dubai has a well-established bus system run by the Roads & Transport Authority (RTA). There are 186 routes on weekdays transporting over 30 million people weekly. It operates from 4am - 1am (except for night buses & C01)

The (RTA) runs 1,518 buses around the whole emirate. From Dubai Logistics City in the West to the Al Qusais Industrial area in East Dubai. The buses are of various sizes & models. The new fleet was expected to be fully operational by the end of 2008. Under brand name Dubai Bus an extensive bus system is operated. Some bus lines are feeders for the metro system. 895 of 2185 bus stops are equipped with air-conditioned shelters. The bus fleet consists almost entirely of low floor European-made, air-conditioned buses by Neoplan, Mercedes-Benz, Volvo, Solaris, VDL and Optare. In August 2019, the Road and Transport Authority (RTA) announced that a new night bus service (runs from 10 p.m. to 5 a.m.) will be launched, along with 11 more routes that will be enhanced in terms of timings and connections.

Feeder Bus (F) E.g F31

Brings people from residential areas to the metro

CBD Bus (C) E.g C04

Brings buses around heavily populated areas of Dubai.

Express Bus (X) E.g X28

Express lines through the city

Emirates (E) E.g E101

Intercity Buses

Night Buses (N) E.g N55

Night Buses That Operate From 9pm - 5am

No Letter E.g 7

Standard City Buses

Hatta Buses (H) E.g H02

Buses that go to Hatta or operate within Hatta

Statistics
	2010	2011	2012	2013	2014	2015	2016
Lines			97	99	103 - 105	105 - 11	105 - 120
Trips				3,230,190	3,657,990	3,713,212	3,885,636
Passengers	110,399,157	107,407,948	107,806,085	115,670,587	135,519,872	134,752,549	151,069,499

== Trams ==
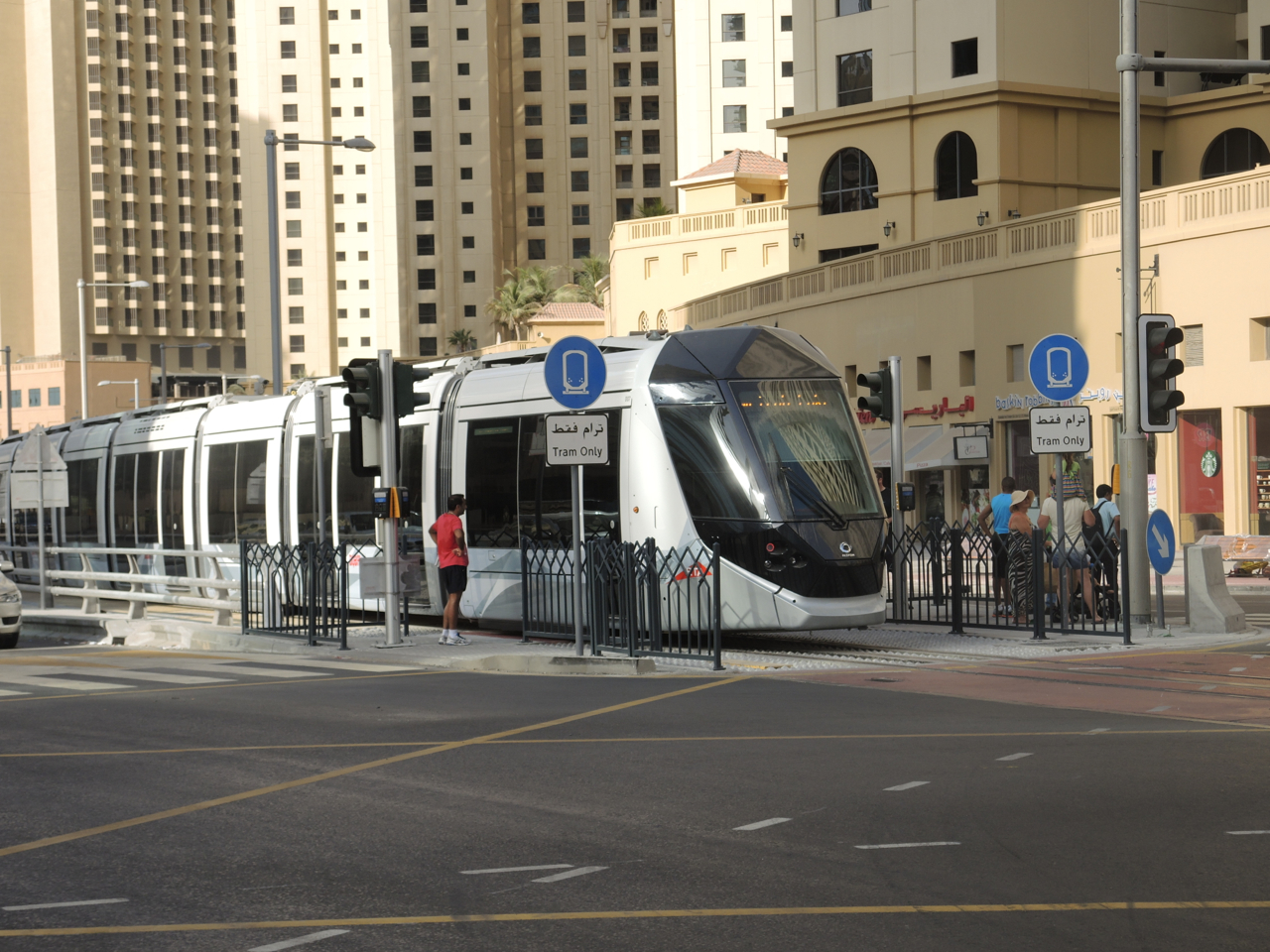
Tram on test run at stop in Dubai Marina, November 2014

As of April 2008, there were two expected tram systems to be built in Dubai by 2011. The first was the Dubai Trolley, and the second was the Dubai Tram.

The Dubai Trolley is a 4.6 km (2.9 mi) tram service that was planned to serve the area around the Burj Khalifa. Announced in April 2008 by Emaar, the Dh500 million system was supposed have two separate lines. The first line, which opened by the end of 2009, ran 1.1 kilometres (0.68 mi) from Dubai Metro's Burj Khalifa station to the Dubai Mall with one stop at The Address Dubai Mall. The first line has trams running in both directions, while the second line only runs in one direction. The second phase, which opened in 2010, serves ten stations. The 4.6 km loop travels clockwise and has a total travel time of eight minutes. It permanently shut down in 2019.

At the same time, the Roads & Transport Authority announced the Dubai Tram (previously known as Al Sufouh Tramway). This tram service runs 14.5 kilometres (9.0 mi) along Al Sufouh Road from Dubai Marina to the Palm Jumeirah. It connects with two stations of Dubai Metro's Red Line. Phase 1, which was expected to open in April 2011, was finally opened in 2014; it has 11 trains with 13 stations running 10 km (6.2 mi). Once Phase 2 is complete, the tram will add 14 more trains and six stations on the additional 4 km (2.5 mi). The planning and construction of the Dubai Tram was undertaken by a consortium of Alstom, Besix and Parsons.

The trams for the network will be 44 m (144 ft) long, have a capacity of 300 passengers and will travel at a maximum speed of 50 km/h (31 mph) and an average commercial speed of 20 km/h (12 mph). Running for 20 h each day, it will take only 30 min to ride the entire length of the system The Dubai Tram uses Alstom Citadis 402s. To provide safety, comfort and aesthetics, the Dubai Tram corporates methods not found in many trams around the world. These trams use ground-level power supply; in other words, the trams do not need overhead cables. This recently invented method, also referred to as Alimentation par Sol or "Aesthetic Power Supply" (APS), is currently used in Bordeaux, France. In June 2010, the consortium led by France's Alstom and the local/Belgian Belhasa Six Construct stopped work on the estimated $1.1bn Al-Sufouh tram project in Dubai because of irregular payments from the project client, Dubai's Roads & Transport Authority (RTA). The system is operational since November 2014.

== Palm Monorail ==
The Palm Monorail is a monorail line on the Palm Jumeirah island in Dubai, United Arab Emirates. It is operated by the UK-based Serco. The monorail connects the Palm Jumeirah to the mainland, with a planned further extension to the Red Line of the Dubai Metro. The line opened on April 30, 2009 as the Palm Jumeirah Monorail. It is the first monorail in the Middle East.

The trains are driverless, with attendants for any emergency situations. It currently runs from Gateway Station to Atlantis Aquaventure and stops at the new Al Ittihad Park Station & Nakheel Mall stations.

== Ports and water travel ==
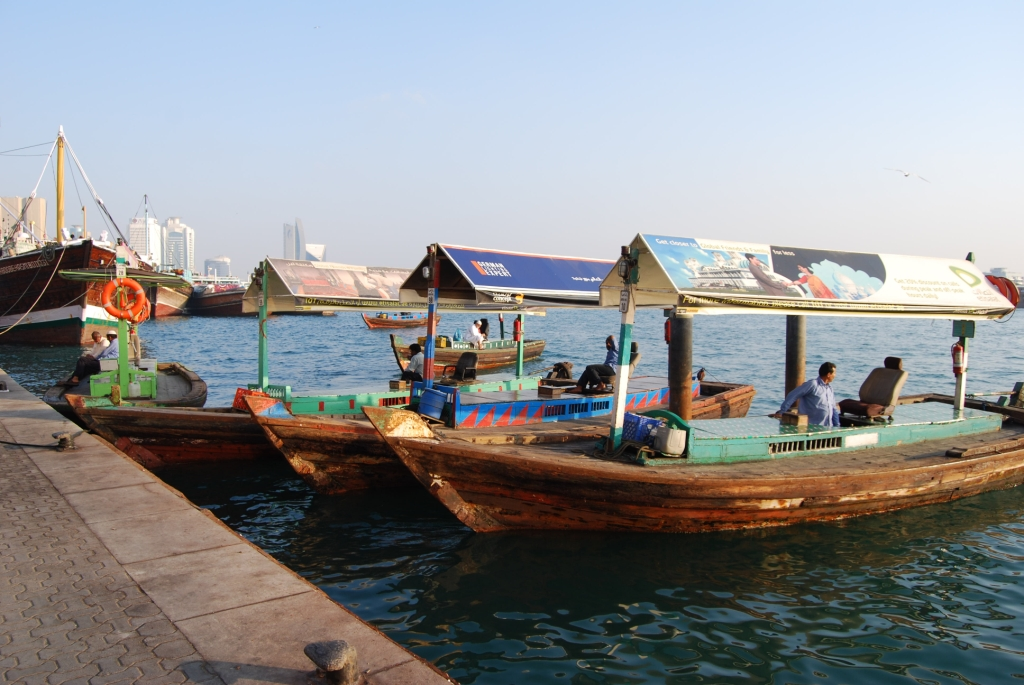
Abras at Bur Dubai

Dubai is served by two large commercial ports, Port Rashid and Port Jebel Ali. Various cruise ships dock in Dubai. Dubai Creek and Port Saeed are used by local traders in dhows.

One of the more traditional means of getting across Dubai Creek between Bur Dubai and Deira is on abras, small boats that ferry passengers across the Creek between stations in Bastakiya and Bani Yas Road, for a nominal charge of 1 UAE dirhams. They can be rented, along with an operator, for 100 UAE dirhams, approximately US$27.

The Marine Transport Agency, part of the Road and Transportation Agency, started the Dubai Water Bus System on Dubai Creek in July 2007. Years ago there used to be a seaplane service which used to take passengers to other parts of the emirates.

== Air travel ==
=== Airports ===
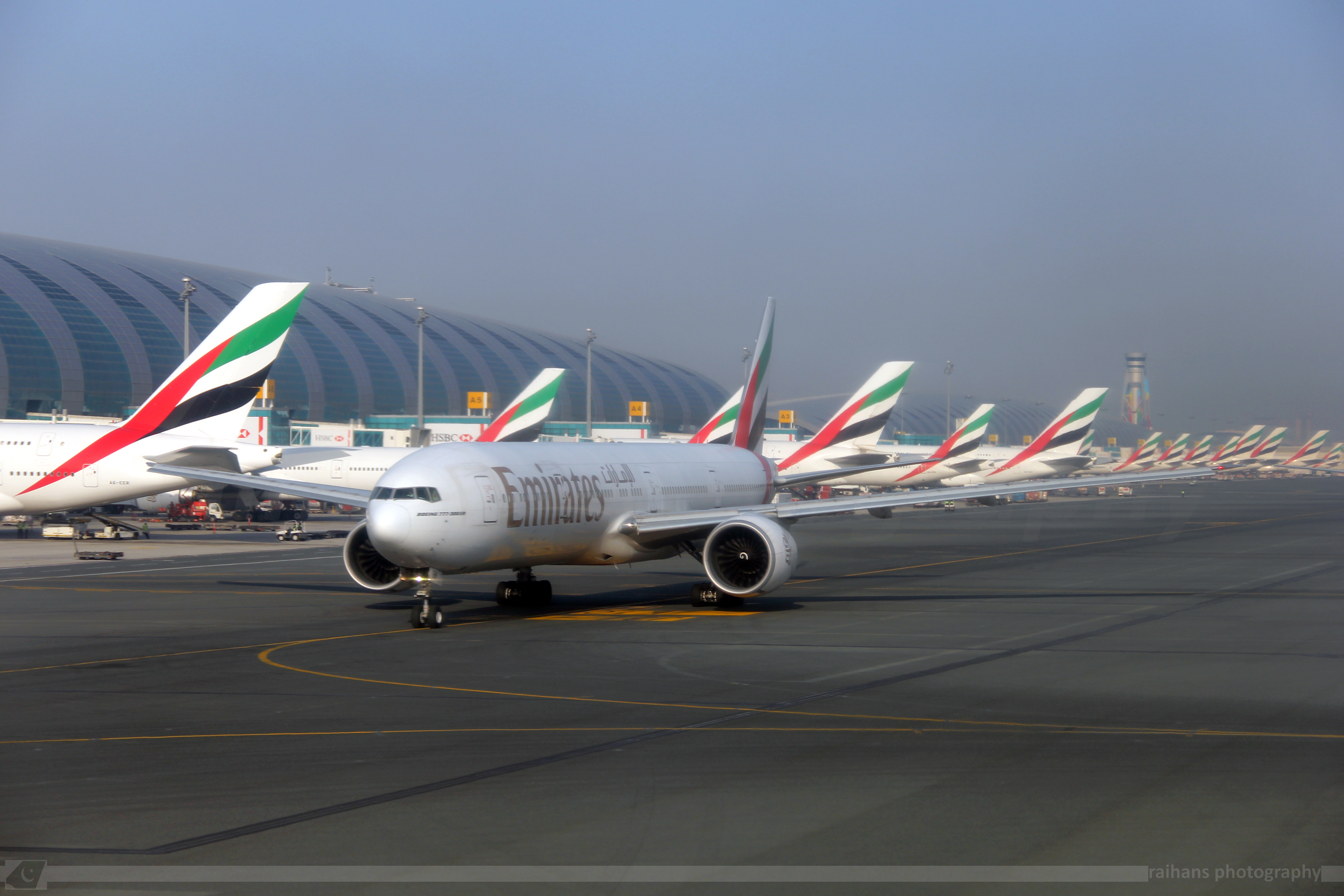
Dubai International Airport

Dubai International Airport is a hub for Emirates and FlyDubai and has a large duty-free shopping center. The airport has won numerous awards for its excellence in design and services. A third terminal, which fully supports the Airbus A380, the largest passenger passenger aircraft in the world, was opened in October 2008 and doubled the airport's capacity. A new concourse catering to the A380 was completed in late 2012.

Al Maktoum International Airport, which opened on 27 June 2010, will make a new free trade area within Dubai and be the centerpiece of the Dubai World Central aerotropolis. The airport was announced in 2004 and construction began in January 2005. The first part was expected to be completed by 2008. Although initially intended as a predominantly cargo airport, plans are afoot for it to handle some 120 million passengers per annum within 20 years, which would likely surpass Atlanta's Hartsfield-Jackson International Airport as the world's busiest airport. Since 2013 only a handful of airlines operate out of Al Maktoum International Airport in terms of passenger services.

Dubai is investing heavily in developing the reach of its airline Emirates. The hope is to develop Dubai's air transportation industry to the point that passengers from any city can fly direct to Dubai. The A380 aircraft, the largest of which has a capacity of 641 passengers, has been flying with Emirates since August 2008.

In addition Etihad Airways provides bus coaches between Dubai and Abu Dhabi International Airport for Etihad customers. Air Arabia provides a similar service for its passengers to Sharjah International Airport, which due to its proximity is used as an alternative airport by Dubai residents.

=== eVTOL ===
Dubai is expected to launch eVTOL air taxis in 2026 with Joby Aviation.

== Dubai Loop ==
The Dubai Loop is a car tunnel system project that aims to serve Downtown Dubai. It was first announced in February 2025. Construction started in February 2026. It is built by The Boring Company. The system will use Tesla Model Y vehicles to shuttle passengers.

The first phase of the project will cover 6.4 kilometres (4.0 mi), comprising four stations (Dubai International Financial Centre, ICD Brookfield Place, Zaabeel Dubai Mall Parking, and Burj Khalifa/Dubai Mall), transporting 13,000 passengers per day and shortening the travel time between DIFC and Dubai Mall from 20 to 3 minutes. It is expected to be launched by 2027. The second phase will feature 19 stations across 22.2 kilometres (13.8 mi), connecting Dubai World Trade Centre to Business Bay. It is planned to be built within three years and handle 30,000 passengers per day.

== Glydways ==
The Glydways personal rapid transit is expected to be launched in 2026. It aims to handle 10,000 passengers per hour in each direction, traveling at 50 km/h. Four routes were announced: National Paints metro station to Bluewaters Island, Mall of the Emirates metro station to Madinat Jumeirah, Onpassive metro station to Alserkal Avenue and Times Square Centre, and a 7-km route in Dubai Festival City.

== See also ==
- List of roads in Dubai
- Nol Card
- Roads & Transport Authority (Dubai)
- Palm Monorail
