= Hawthorne test tunnel =

Tunnel for testing Loop-based transportation

Boring test tunnel
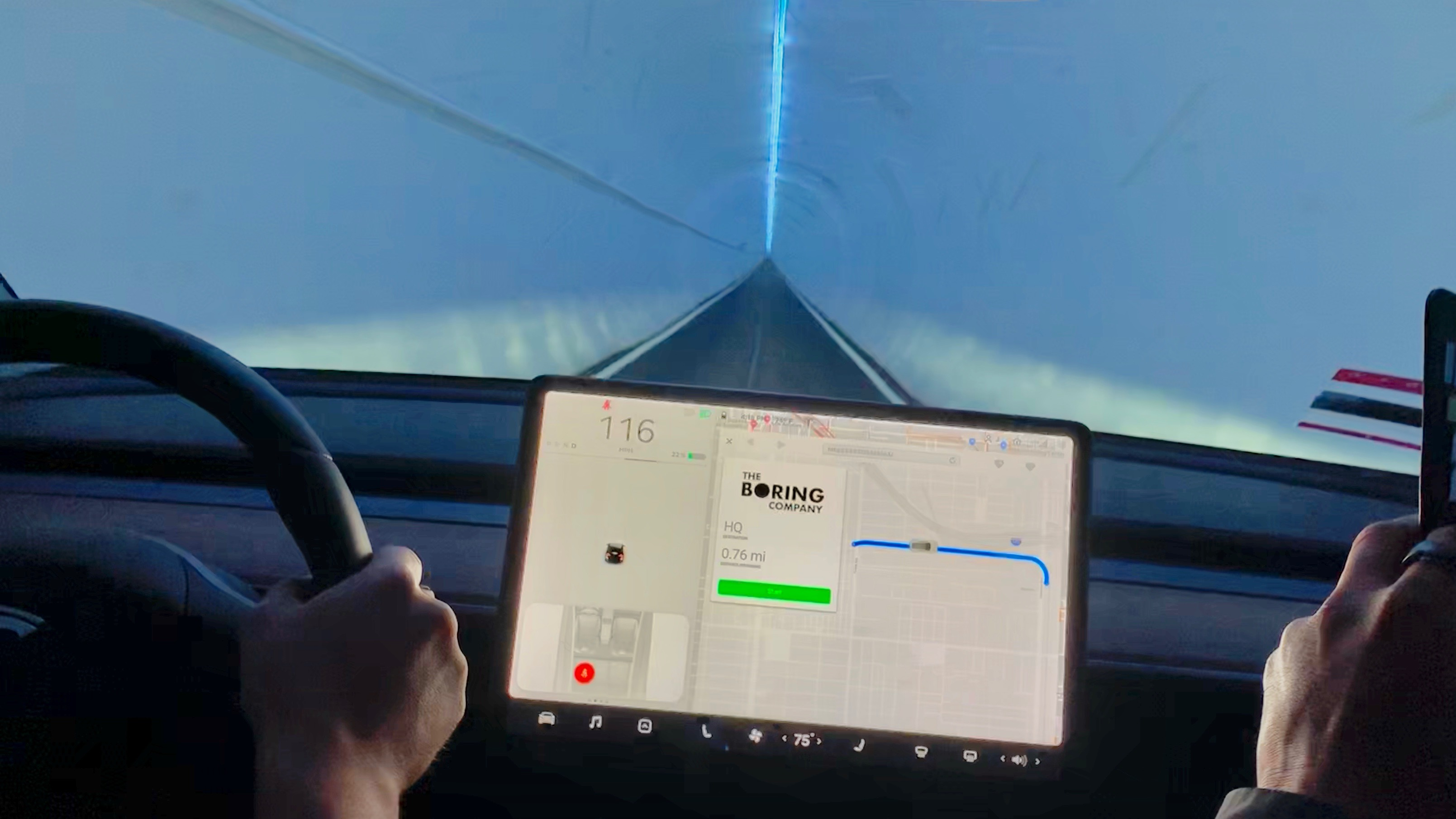
- Interactive map of Boring test tunnel

Overview
- Other names: The R&D Tunnel; Boring test tunnel
- Location: Hawthorne, California, U.S.
- Coordinates: 33.9218°N 118.326°W; 33.92383°N 118.3407°W; 33.9234°N 118.3444°W
- Route: West 120th Street
- Start: SpaceX Parking Lot

Operation
- Work began: December 17, 2016
- Opened: December 18, 2018
- Operator: The Boring Company
- Character: Limited access

Technical
- Length: 1.14 mi; 6,000 ft (1.83 km)
- No. of lanes: 1
- Width: 12.5 feet (3.8 m)

The Hawthorne test tunnel, or Boring test tunnel, is a 1.14 miles (1.83 km) tunnel in Hawthorne, California, intended for testing “tunneling and public transportation systems”, constructed between 2016 and 2018. It was accompanied by a mile-long aboveground tube on nearby Jack Northrop Ave designed for testing hyperloop and loop-based transportation, which was used for student competitions in 2018 and 2019 before being dismantled in 2022.

== Description ==
The single-bore tunnel was constructed during using a 14-foot (4.2 m) diameter tunnel boring machine, giving a finished 12-foot (3.8 m) internal diameter. The roadway has an asphalt surface, with autonomous vehicle operation of the Tesla Model 3 at speeds of 90 mph (140 km/h) and up to 116 mph (187 km/h) under human control. The Boring Company subsequently built the Las Vegas Convention Center Loop tunnel network.

== Route ==
Most of the route runs outside and set back from the perimeter of Hawthorne Municipal Airport, with a very short section under the corner of the airport fence, without going under the runway.

The tunnel starts between the Dominguez Channel storm drain and Crenshaw Boulevard at an entrance pit constructed on parking lot land owned by SpaceX. A short straight section heading northwards is followed by a 530-foot-radius (161.5 m) curve westwards under West 120th Street, then a long straight tunnel, a slight curve and a final short straight to the Exit Shaft. The midpoint of the tunnel was planned to connect with a very short northwards spur to a small car parking system-style car elevator leading up inside a residential garage behind a house at 3834 West 119th Place.

== Timeline ==
On December 17, 2016, Elon Musk, the founder of the Boring Company, stated that he was frustrated with traffic jams, and would start building a tunnel. By April 2017, The Boring Company had obtained a second-hand tunnel boring machine, transported the machine to Hawthorne, and had it repainted in Boring Company colors.

On January 31, 2018, The Boring Company acquired the land around a family house at 3834 West 119th Place for $500,000. On May 9, 2018, The Boring Company acquired land on the corner of West 120th and Prairie Avenue for $2 million, purchasing the corner plots 309 and 308 at 12007 Prairie Avenue And Plots 304‒307 behind.

On October 5, 2018, the Hawthorne City Council granted an easement for up to 2,600 meters (8,600 ft) of tunnel, in exchange for a structural encroachment fee of $2.5 million. Permission for the first 210 meters (700 ft) of tunnel under SpaceX's own land had been obtained earlier.

On October 17, 2018, in preparation for opening "The Brick Store", the company applied for permission to paint the building at 12003 Prairie Avenue in The Boring Company black-and-white corporate colors.

An opening ceremony for the test tunnel was originally scheduled for December 10, 2018, then moved to December 18, 2018.

During the launch day on December 18, 2018, cars operated using guided busway-style side-facing guide wheels. This fleet of Tesla Model X vehicles traveled at up to 40 miles per hour (65 km/h).
