= Las Vegas Convention Center =

Convention center in Winchester, Nevada, US

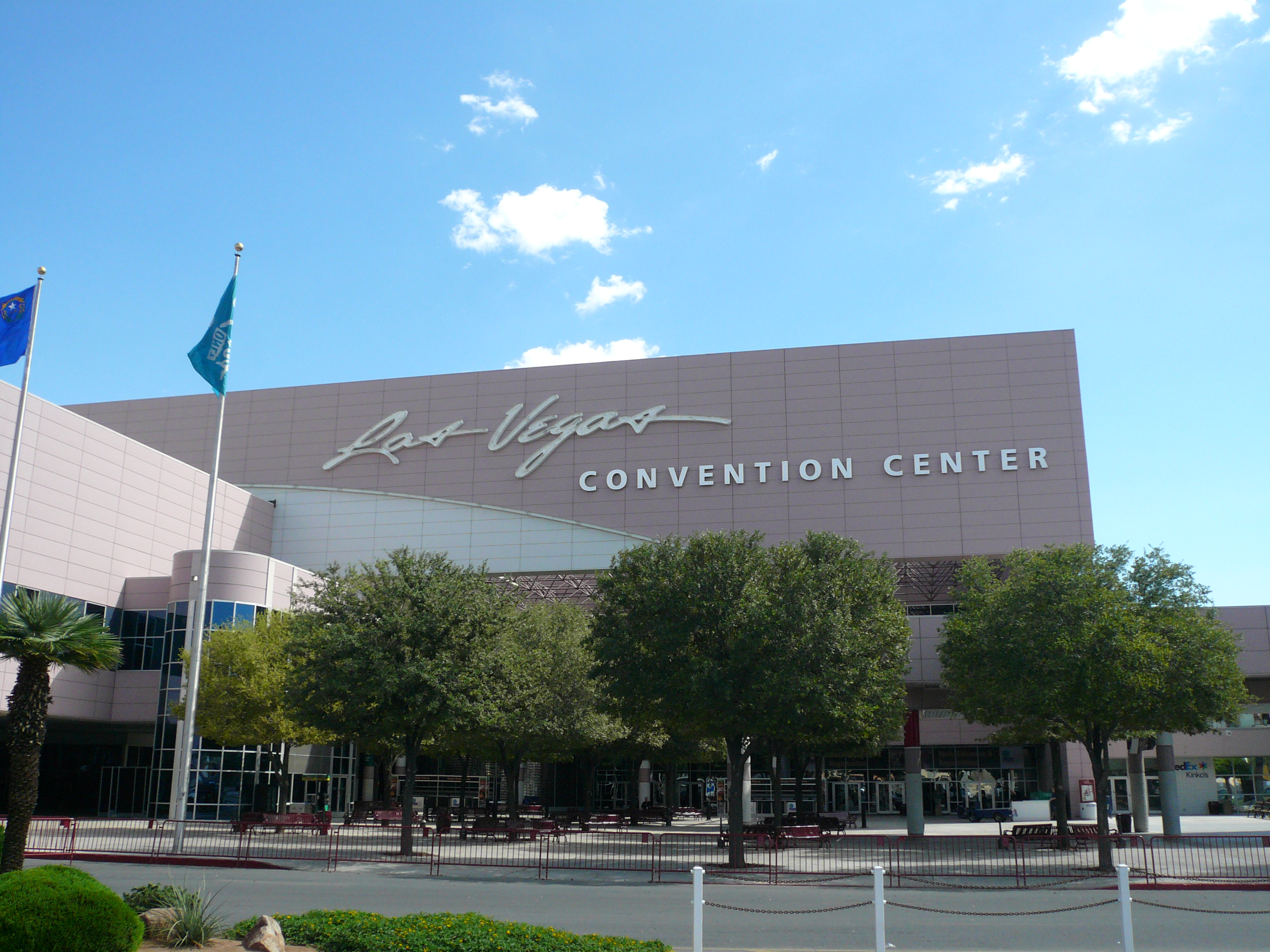

- Location in Nevada Location in the United States Location in North America
- Interactive map of Las Vegas Convention Center
- Address: 3150 Paradise Road
- Location: Winchester, Nevada, U.S.
- Coordinates: 36.131516°N 115.151507°W
- Owner: Las Vegas Convention and Visitors Authority
- Public transit: Las Vegas Convention Center (LV Monorail station)

Construction
- Built: 1959; 67 years ago
- Opened: April 12, 1959; 67 years ago
- Expanded: 1971, 1990, 1998, 2002 and 2021

Website
- lvcva.com

The Las Vegas Convention Center (commonly referred to as LVCC) is a convention center in Winchester, Nevada. It is owned and operated by the Las Vegas Convention and Visitors Authority.

As one of the largest convention centers in the world, it has 2,500,000 sq ft (230,000 m^{2}) of exhibit space and hosts shows with an estimated 200,000 participants. The Conexpo-Con/Agg construction trade show in 2008 used the most space, 2,400,000 sq ft (220,000 m^{2}).

At the end of 2010, the entire Las Vegas Valley had more than 10,000,000 sq ft (930,000 m^{2}) of exhibit space.

== History ==
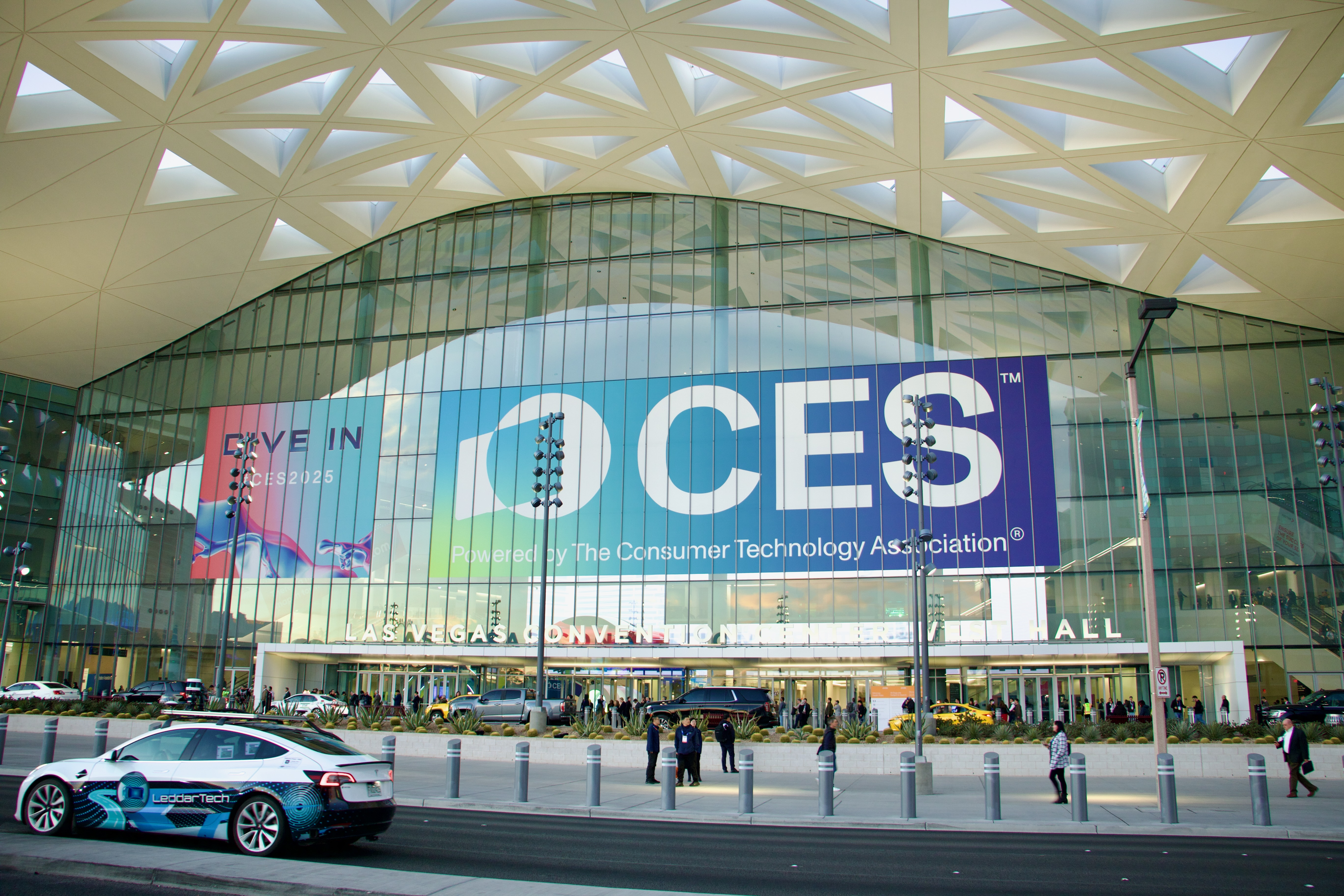
The exterior of the west hall of the convention center during the 2025 Consumer Electronics Show.

In the 1950s, the Las Vegas city and county leaders recognized the need for a convention facility. The initial goal was to increase the occupancy rates of hotels during low tourist months. Leaders chose a site one block east of the Las Vegas Strip at the site of the Las Vegas Park Speedway, a failed horse and automobile racing facility from the early 1950s. A 6,300 capacity, silver-domed rotunda with an adjoining 90,000 sq ft (8,400 m^{2}) exhibition hall opened in April 1959. The architect of the original structure was Adrian Jennings Wilson (1898–1988) of Los Angeles. It hosted The Beatles on August 20, 1964.

The Convention Center was also the site of several major professional boxing fights in the 1960s: Gene Fullmer versus Sugar Ray Robinson on March 4, 1961; Fullmer versus Benny Paret on December 9, 1961; Sonny Liston vs. Floyd Patterson II on July 22, 1963; and Muhammad Ali vs. Floyd Patterson on November 22, 1965.

Led Zeppelin was supposed to perform at the convention center on April 19, 1970, as the final show of their Spring 1970 North American Tour, but the concert was canceled because lead singer Robert Plant fell ill the previous night.

The venue was home to the UNLV Runnin' Rebels men's basketball team from 1966 to 1982. The original silver dome was demolished in 1991, creating space for expansion. Upon completion, there was vastly more space: 1.6 million sq ft (150,000 m^{2}), including 1.3 million sq ft (120,000 m^{2}) for exhibitors, making it one of the largest single-level facilities in the world.

The Las Vegas Convention Center Act of 1971 authorized the use of $7 million to rebuild, remodel or expand the center. By 1985, the center had held 7,000 conventions since its opening.

The Convention Center dome hosted two Billy Graham Crusades between 1978 and 1980.

On December 19, 1993, the draw for the 1994 FIFA World Cup was held at the building.

In 1993, the Las Vegas Convention and Visitors Authority (LVCVA) purchased the defunct Landmark hotel-casino, which was across from the convention center. LVCVA demolished the resort in 1995 to develop additional parking on the site for convention guests. An expansion in 1998 increased the center to 1.9 million sq ft (180,000 m^{2}).

While it functioned, COMDEX was the most attended trade show in the United States, with over 200,000 attendees on several occasions.

In 2000, early planning began for another expansion of the center. The new $150 million South Hall was topped out on February 20, 2001. It would consist of 1.3 million sq ft (120,000 m^{2}). Upon completion in 2004, it crossed a major roadway (Desert Inn Road), with four bridges connecting the facilities.

As of 2009, the Consumer Electronics Show is the most attended annual trade show at this location, with more than 140,000 attendees.

=== Expansion ===
In 2018, the Las Vegas Convention Center released plans to undergo yet another $890 million expansion, the 14th in its history. The expansion intended to increase the center's meeting space and improve the building's overall design. Updates would feature the latest in technology, as well as to connect the Convention Center to the Las Vegas Strip. The authority has announced plans to expand the direction of the LVCC by creating a Las Vegas Global Business District. Those plans resulted in the announcement for the acquisition of the Riviera in February 2015 for $182.5 million.

Work was underway on the expansion in 2019 on land previously occupied by the Landmark and Riviera resorts. The 1.4 million sq ft (130,000 m^{2}) expansion includes 150,000 sq ft (14,000 m^{2}) of dedicated meeting space and 600,000 sq ft (56,000 m^{2}) of exhibit space. The expansion was complete as of 2021.

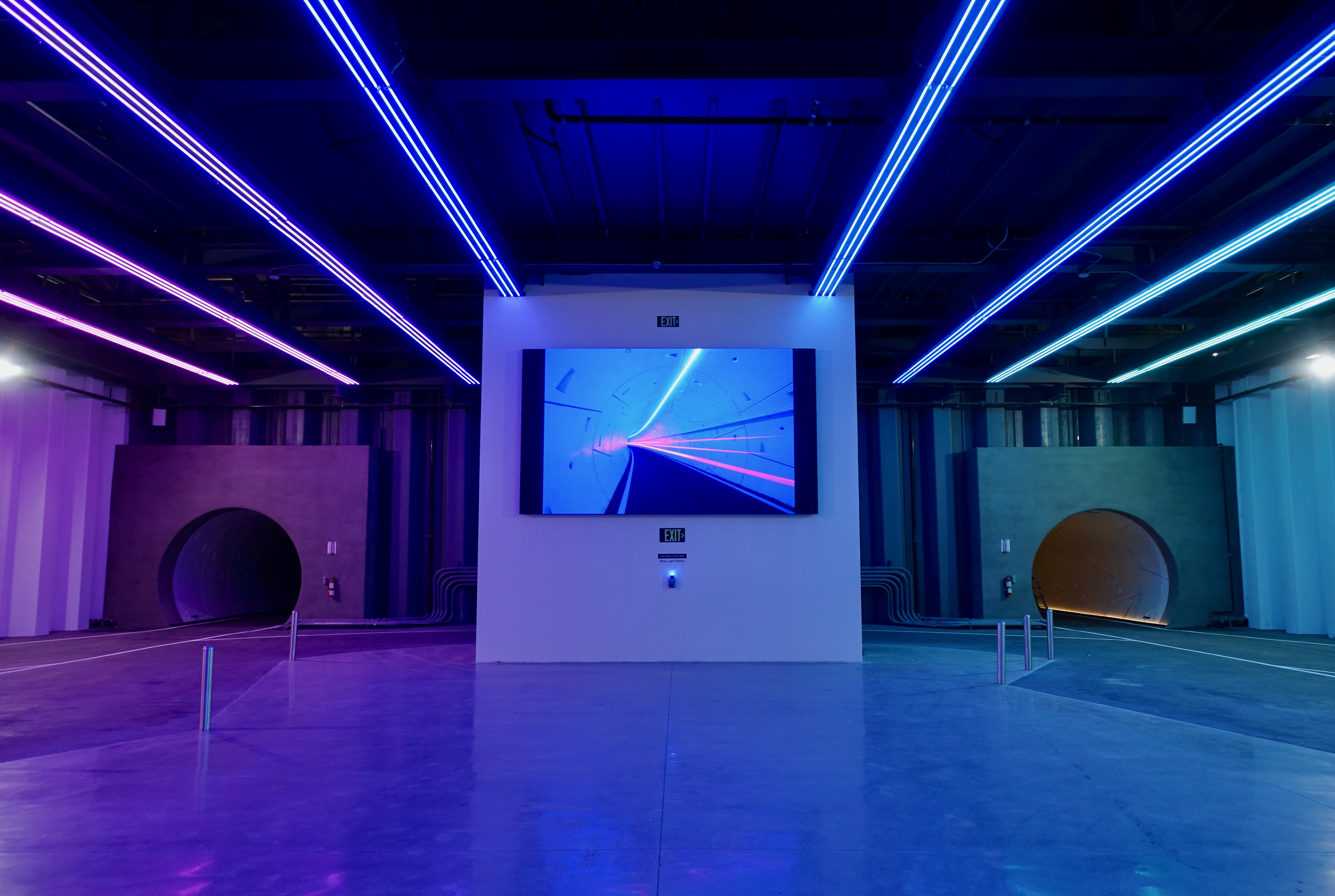
The Las Vegas Convention Center Loop

Construction of an underground Las Vegas Convention Center Loop, people mover by The Boring Company began in late 2019 to reduce walking times within the center. Twin tunnels opened in June 2021 at a cost of $53 million with three stations 40 feet below the surface, shuttling passengers in conventional, human-driven Tesla vehicles. While the long-term goal of the system is to have autonomous vehicles operating at higher speeds, as of May 2021 no date has been set for this.

== In popular culture ==
A variety of shows have been taped in the convention center including Food Network specials and the 2009 Jeopardy! Tournament of Champions. Numerous conventions produce live shows in the facility.

In The Boss Baby, the Forever puppies got launched here via Puppyco's in-house built rocket but failed to deliver.

From April 17-21, 2025, the convention center hosted WWE's WWE World at WrestleMania convention which featured live pro wrestling matches, autograph signings from various WWE talent, meet-and-greets, memorabilia displays, and fan activities. The Pat McAfee Show also aired special episodes from the convention on ESPN, ESPN+, and YouTube.

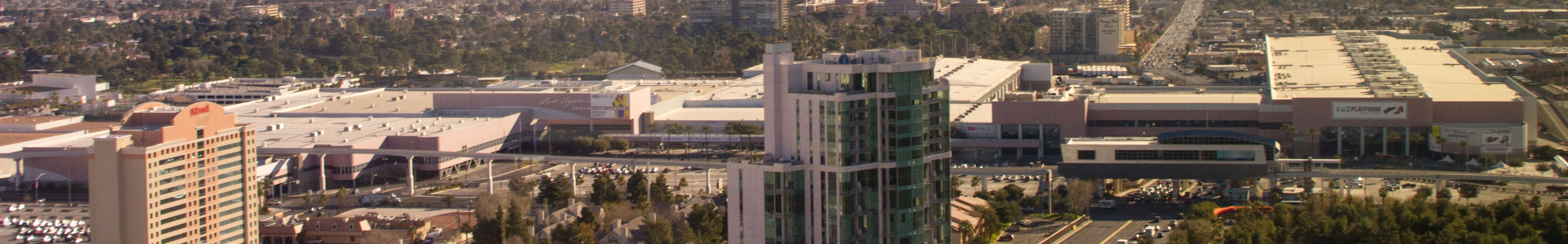
Las Vegas Convention Center prior to its expansion
