= Jarrett Walker =

American transit consultant and author (born 1962)

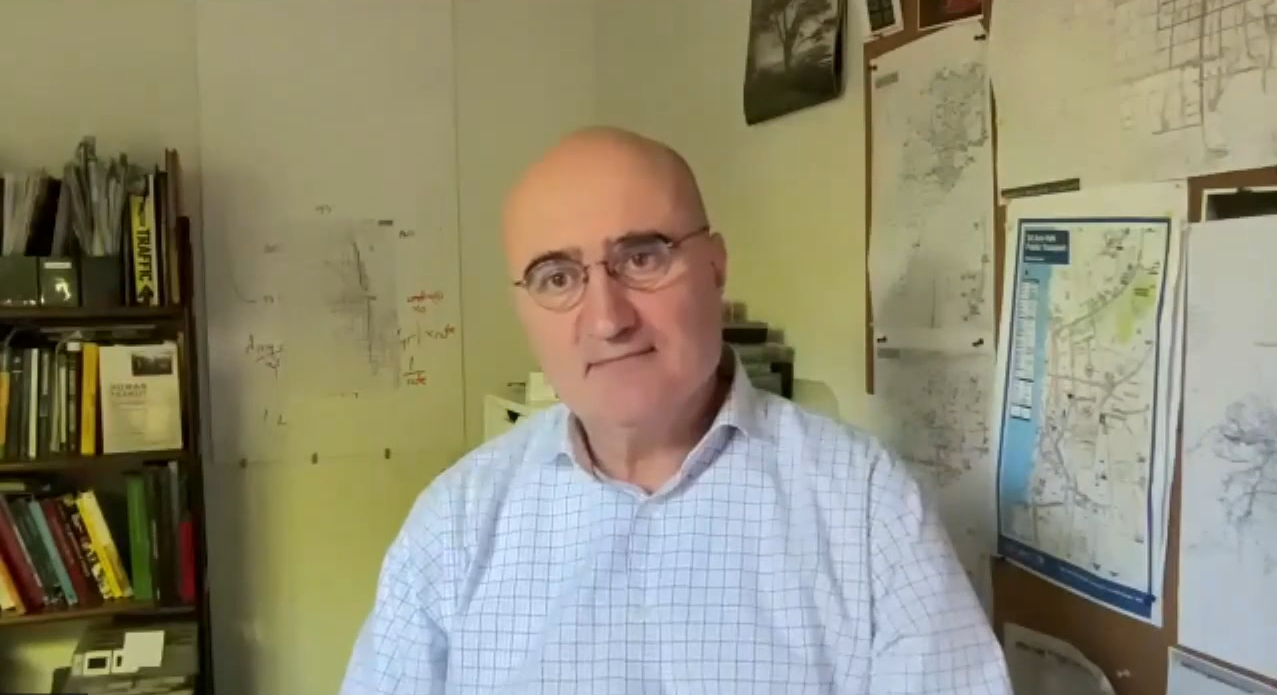
- Walker in 2023
- Born: May 9, 1962 (age 64)
- Education: Pomona College (BA); Stanford University (PhD)
- Occupations: Transit consultant and author
- Years active: 1991–present
- Organization: Jarrett Walker + Associates
- Notable work: Human Transit

Jarrett Walker (born May 9, 1962) is an American public transit consultant and author. He has a consulting firm based in Portland, Oregon, that has worked on projects across North America, Europe, and Oceania. Walker is the author of the blog Human Transit and book of the same name.

== Career ==
In the 1970s, Walker became interested in transit issues while using Portland's TriMet bus system. He later worked as a planning intern at TriMet.

Walker is the president of Jarrett Walker + Associates, a consultancy that contracts with public transit agencies. He and his firm have completed transit redesign projects in dozens of cities throughout the world, including Houston, Moscow, Auckland, and Dublin.

In 2011, Walker published Human Transit: How Clearer Thinking about Public Transit Can Enrich Our Communities and Our Lives with Island Press. In 2024, he published a revised edition that expands on his ideas of access, meaning the freedom to do things that require leaving home.

Walker has written several peer-reviewed papers, including "To Predict with Confidence", published in the Journal of Public Transportation in 2018, and "Purpose-Driven Public Transport," published in the Journal of Transport Geography in 2008. He has also been published in the peer-reviewed Shakespeare Quarterly. He has also written for Bloomberg CityLab and The Atlantic.

In December 2017, Walker attracted media attention after publicly feuding with billionaire and Tesla CEO Elon Musk. Musk expressed his disdain for public transit and reiterated his preference for individual transportation in response to a conference audience question. Walker criticized him on Twitter, stating that "Musk's hatred of sharing space with strangers is a luxury (or pathology) that only the rich can afford." Musk responded with "You're an idiot", before saying: "Sorry... meant to say 'sanctimonious idiot.'" The dispute led to a broader debate about Musk's opinions on transit.

=== Walker's planning philosophy ===
Walker frames discussions about public transportation in terms of an area's geometry and how it influences a transit network's ridership and coverage (also known as the "ridership-coverage trade-off"). He argued that an area's physical features (for example, the Bay Area's bay) significantly impact a transit network's ideal design and potential ridership.

Walker has argued that transit agencies' focus on predictions and new technologies distracts from necessary improvements to existing transportation systems. He has also stated that when working as a consulting planner, he views his role as "only stating geometric facts", or presenting potential designs for the agency employing him to consider. He typically presents a variety of designs, with some more heavily focused on increasing ridership and others more centered around increasing coverage. In his work with Houston METRO, Walker proposed creating a grid of bus routes with frequent service instead of focusing on expanding physical coverage, and the transit agency ultimately implemented his recommendations. The revisions were implemented in 2015, and led to an 11% increase in ridership on weekdays and a 30% increase on weekends a year later.

Walker has often asserted that "frequency is freedom" – frequent transit service helps people better access their communities, and that buses are often the most affordable way to expand transit service. He has observed that people who regularly travel by car often don't grasp the importance of frequency, and thus undervalue it: "It's very difficult to get motorists to understand that importance. I tell them to imagine a gate at the end of your driveway that only opens once every half an hour."

In his book Human Transit, he lists seven requirements for a good public transit network:

1. It takes me where I want to go – coverage
2. It takes me when I want to go – span
3. It's a good use of my time – frequency
4. It's a good use of my money – price
5. It respects me – cleanliness and safety
6. I can trust it – reliability
7. It gives me the freedom to change my plans – frequency again

In the 2024 Revised Edition of his book Human Transit, Walker puts new emphasis on the concept of access (sometimes called accessibility) by which he means your freedom to do anything that requires leaving home. His firm analyzes service change proposals not by predicting ridership — which Walker argues is unpredictable — but instead by measuring how a plan expands or reduces where a person could get to in an amount of time they are likely to have in their day. He argues that while ridership is unpredictable, access analysis captures the way that the design of the network influences ridership. He also argues that access is a measure of many other things that people value, including the economic viability of the city and the experience of personal freedom.

Walker has criticized claims that modern ride-share services like Lyft and Uber are equivalent to or a potential replacement for public transit, arguing that ride-share services are much less efficient than even a relatively low-density bus service. As lockdowns resulting from the COVID-19 pandemic caused sharp reductions in ridership on transit, Walker was featured in a New York Times article as saying that transit is "not a business. And nowhere has that been more obvious than now. The sensible fiduciary thing to do would be to shut things down as quickly as possible, furlough the entire staff and wait. They're not doing that because they're expected to provide an essential service."

Walker's proposed redesigns have sometimes faced criticism from city residents, advocacy groups, or news agencies. In Dublin, Walker proposed consolidating the city's bus network into central "spines" with more frequent bus service. The public transit authority received over 72,000 comments from the public, of which a large portion criticized the proposal as service cuts, despite overall increases to both service frequency and geographic coverage. In addition, libertarian Randal O'Toole, a noted transit skeptic, has been a vocal critic of the implications of Jarrett Walker's work.

== Personal life ==
Walker was raised in Portland, Oregon in the 1970s. He graduated with a bachelor's degree from Pomona College in 1980 and received his PhD in theater arts and humanities from Stanford University in 1996.

== Selected publications ==
- Human Transit: How Clearer Thinking About Public Transit Can Enrich Our Communities and Our Lives (Revised ed.). Island Press. 2024. ISBN 9781642833058.
- Human Transit: How Clearer Thinking About Public Transit Can Enrich Our Communities and Our Lives. Island Press. 2011. ISBN 9781597269728. OCLC 1023266302.
- "Purpose-driven public transport: creating a clear conversation about public transport goals". Journal of Transport Geography. 16 (6): 436–442. November 2008. doi:10.1016/j.jtrangeo.2008.06.005.
- "Voiceless Bodies and Bodiless Voices: The Drama of Human Perception in "Coriolanus"". Shakespeare Quarterly. 43 (2): 170. Summer 1992. doi:10.2307/2870880.
