= Vegas Loop =

Car tunnel system in Winchester, Nevada, US

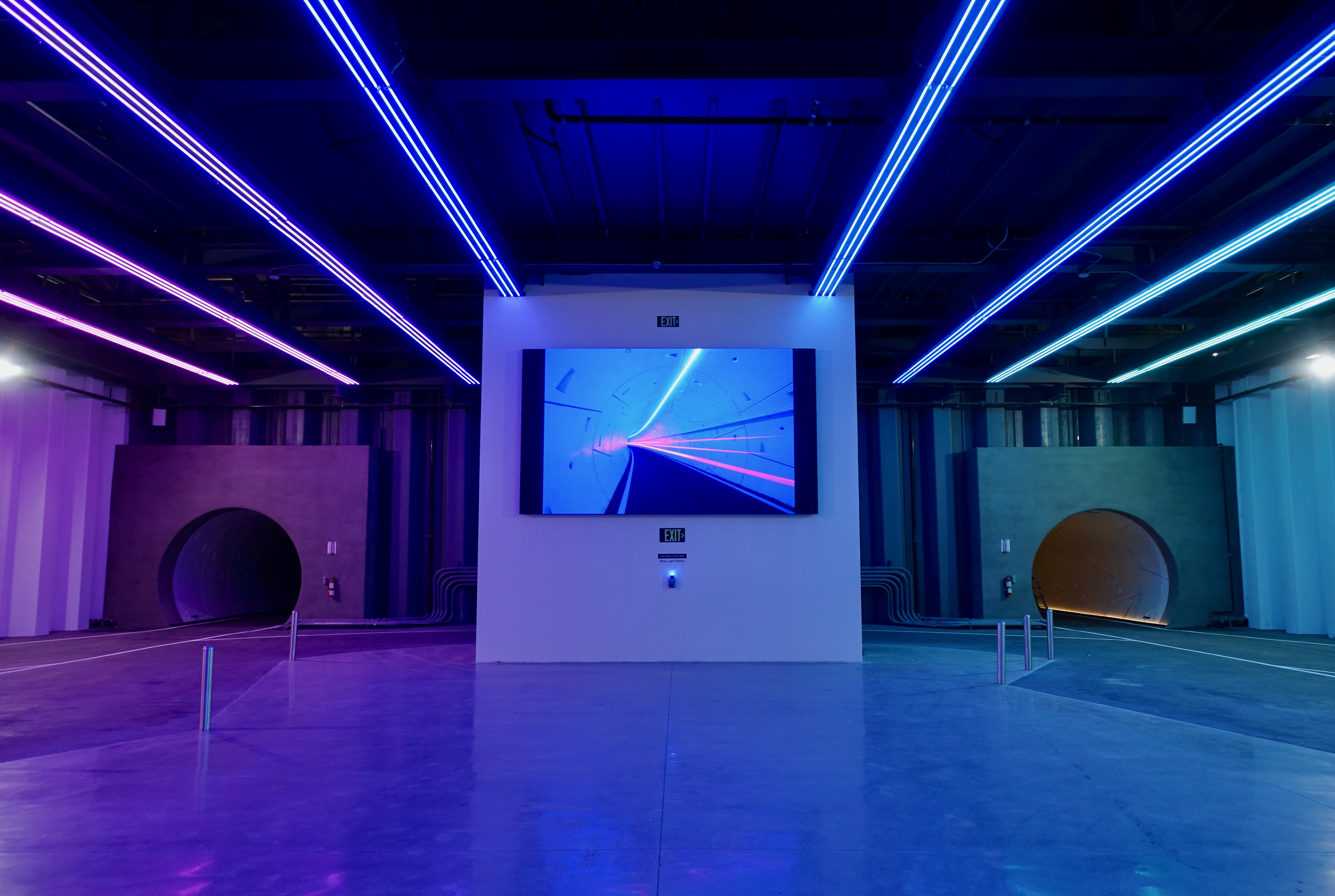
- Interactive map of Vegas Loop

Overview
- Other names: LVCC Loop; Vegas Loop
- Location: Winchester; Paradise
- Status: Operating hours coincide with events at Convention Center
- No. of stations: 9

Operation
- Opened: June 1, 2021; 5 years ago
- Owner: The Boring Company (outside of LVCC); Las Vegas Convention Center; Las Vegas Convention and Visitors Authority (within LVCC)
- Traffic: Passenger shuttle only
- Character: Underground car shuttle private roadway

Technical
- Length: 2.2 miles (3.5 km)
- No. of lanes: 1
- Operating speed: 35 mph (56 km/h)

The Vegas Loop, originally known as the Las Vegas Convention Center Loop (LVCC Loop), is a car tunnel system that serves the Las Vegas Convention Center, area hotels and attractions, and Harry Reid International Airport. Operating since 2021, the system uses Tesla Model Y vehicles to shuttle passengers among nine stations. The Boring Company began construction in November 2019 and has continued intermittent tunnel drilling for planned stations. When completed, the company projects that the Loop will include 68 miles of tunnels and 123 stations.

== History ==
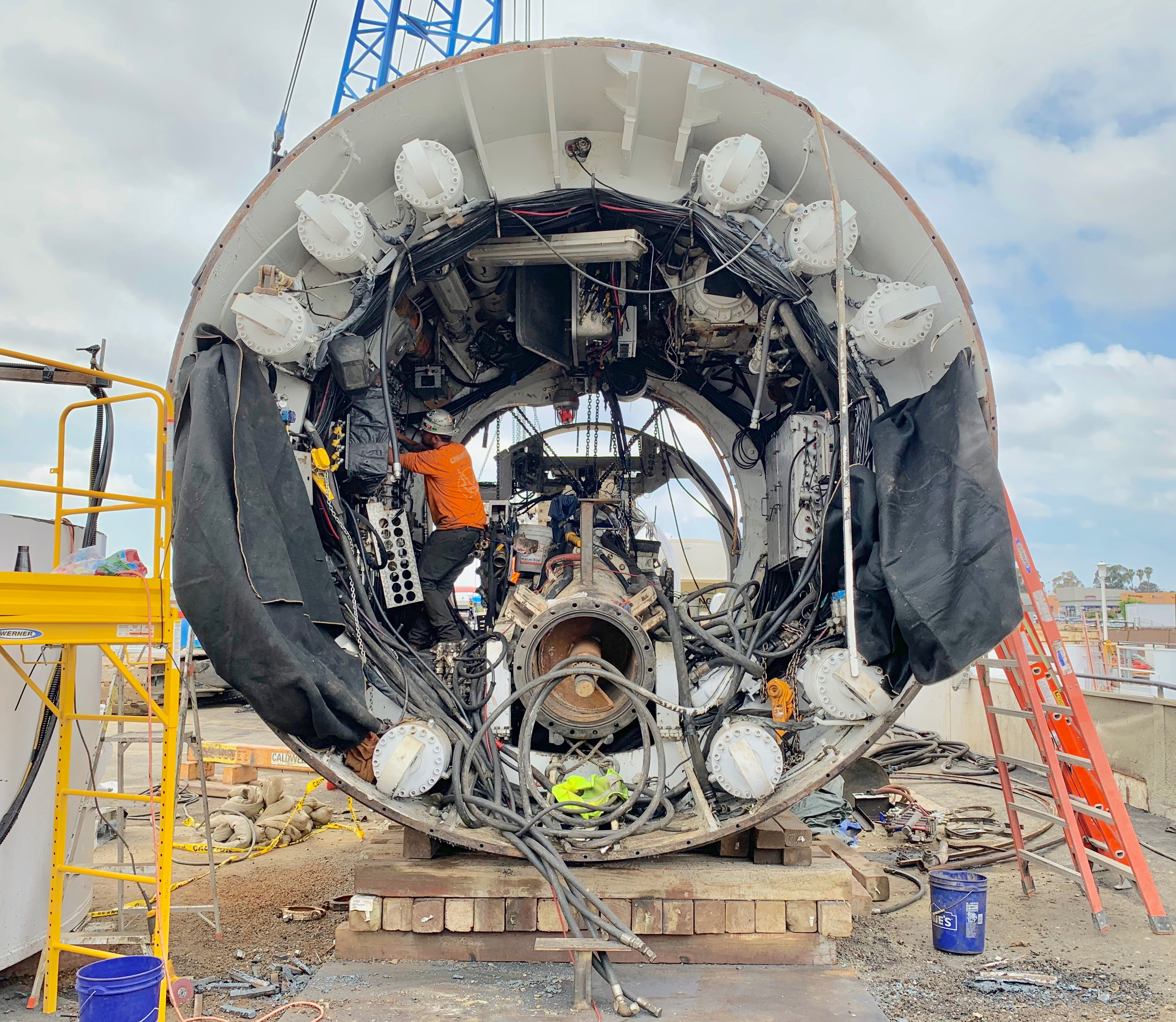
The Boring Company machine in 2019

The Boring Company won a $48.7-million ($60.4 million in 2025) contract in May 2019 from the Las Vegas Convention and Visitors Authority (LVCVA). and began drilling the first tunnel on November 15, 2019, digging at about 49 feet (15 m) per day. The 4,475-foot (1,364 m) first leg tunnel was completed on February 14, 2020. The second tunnel was finished that May, for a total of 1.7 miles (2.7 km) of tunnels. The tunnel opened in October 2021. Standard Tesla vehicles with human drivers are used as shuttles, traveling at about 35 miles per hour (56 km/h). The service was described by Las Vegas Tourism as "an important step in the development of a game-changing transportation solution in Las Vegas".

The Boring Company started testing the system with volunteers in May 2021. The test demonstrated the new transport system could move up to about 4,400 passengers per hour with an end-to-end time of about two minutes. The system started transporting convention attendees on June 8, 2021. In July 2021, the peak passenger flow was recorded at 1,355 passengers per hour. Designed to solve traffic congestion, the tunnel was intended to provide trips of less than two minutes, but has faced a number of traffic jams during busy events in 2021 and 2022.

In October 2021, Clark County Commissioners approved a 50-year franchise agreement for a 52-stop, mostly-underground system, a "16-mile [26 km] dual loop system [...] operating mainly in the Resort Corridor with stations at various resorts and connections to Allegiant Stadium, Brightline West Las Vegas Station, and the University of Nevada, Las Vegas". TBC planned to build five to ten stations during the first year, and then add approximately 16 stations per year thereafter. TBC was responsible for funding the tunnel, while station costs would be funded by the resort properties and landowners. In October 2025, prior to the opening of the Fontainebleau station, the The Nevada Independent reported that eight stations had opened, with expansion of 1.25 new stations opened annually since 2021.

The tunnel to Resorts World Las Vegas opened in July 2022.

In May 2023, TBC was given permission to build the Vegas Loop underground transportation system to 69 stations for a tunnel network of 65 miles (105 km). It would include the existing LVCC Loop and extensions to casinos along the Strip, Harry Reid International Airport, Allegiant Stadium, and downtown Las Vegas. TBC claims that once complete, the Vegas Loop would be able to transport more than 90,000 passengers per hour, though the figure has met criticism as inflated.

In February 2024, Nevada Occupational Safety and Health Administration (OSHA) found several safety violations at TBC, and fined it $112,000. The violations included eight serious violations from June to October 2023 and allegations that workers have faced chemical burns from sludge while working in the tunnels. Numerous employee accounts described the working conditions as "almost unbearable". The company challenged the ruling. In March 2024, the Las Vegas Convention and Visitors Authority board of directors voted to extend the existing tunnel, and vowed to address concerns that arose over the OSHA violations. In April 2024, The Boring Company work in Las Vegas was named among the "Dirty Dozen", the worst workplace safety offenders in the US, by the National Council for Occupational Safety and Health.

It has been speculated that TBC may be subsidizing the Loop to keep customer prices low. A day pass from Resorts World costs $5, while the LVCVA is paying TBC an additional $4.5 million annually, which equates to $7.50 per ride.

Nevada's occupational safety agency fined the company $400,000 on May 28, 2025, after two firefighters endured chemical burns while in Loop tunnels during a training exercise. The fines were "summarily rescinded" the following day, at a meeting of Boring president Steve Davis with "high-ranking state officials".

Between 2021 and October 2025, The Boring Company subsidiaries have acquired eight properties along the Las Vegas Loop route.

On October 28, 2025, Boring was served a notice of violation and fined $500,000 for "dumping apparent drill fluid" into the sewer system of the Clark County Water Reclamation District starting April 21, 2025.

== System ==
The transportation system consists of tunnels and surface roads which are used by Tesla cars, driven by employees, to shuttle passengers to stops at the Las Vegas Convention Center complex and Las Vegas transportation connections. The loop cost $53 million when it opened in June 2021 and is 40 feet (12 m) below ground. Passengers reach the two below-ground stations with escalators and elevators. The loop is 1.7 miles (2.7 km) in length and covers a 25-minute walking distance. The plan is for the cars to be autonomous vehicles in the future.

== Stations ==
Station	Opened	Grade	Location
LVCC Central (Underground)	June 1, 2021	Below Grade	36°07′53″N 115°09′10″W
LVCC South	June 1, 2021	At Grade	36°07′41″N 115°08′48″W
LVCC West	June 1, 2021	At Grade	36°07′59″N 115°09′35″W
LVCC Rivera	July 11, 2022	At Grade	36°08′09″N 115°09′35″W
Resorts World	July 11, 2022	At Grade	36°08′00″N 115°09′59″W
Westgate	January 22, 2025	At Grade	36°08′09″N 115°09′09″W
Encore	April 8, 2025	At Grade	36°07′46″N 115°09′48″W
LVCC Central (Plaza)	April 8, 2025	At Grade	36°07′51″N 115°09′12″W
Airport T1	December 30, 2025		
Airport T3	December 30, 2025		
Fontainebleau	February 3, 2026	Below Grade	36°08′27″N 115°09′31″W
Sahara	August 3, 2026	At Grade	36°08′31″N 115°09′19″W
Virgin Hotels	November 2026	At Grade	
Hughes Center	Late 2026		
Turnberry Towers			

=== Future stops ===
There are additional phases planned; the completed system will consist of 68 miles (109 km) of tunnels and 55 stops, including stops at Harry Reid International Airport, Allegiant Stadium, the Oakland A's future Las Vegas Stadium, Brightline West Las Vegas Station, UNLV, and downtown Las Vegas.

In April 2024, it was reported that the next tunnel began construction, to connect the convention center to a station located near the Thomas & Mack Center. Tunneling operations were completed in September 2024.

In May 2024, a tunnel was drilled to Virgin Hotels Las Vegas.

In January 2026, the city issued a permit for the construction of two connector tunnels between The Strat and the Las Vegas Convention Center. Boring stated that it also plans further expansions of its underground tunnel network to connect multiple stops to the Las Vegas Strip, downtown, and the airport.

== Connections ==
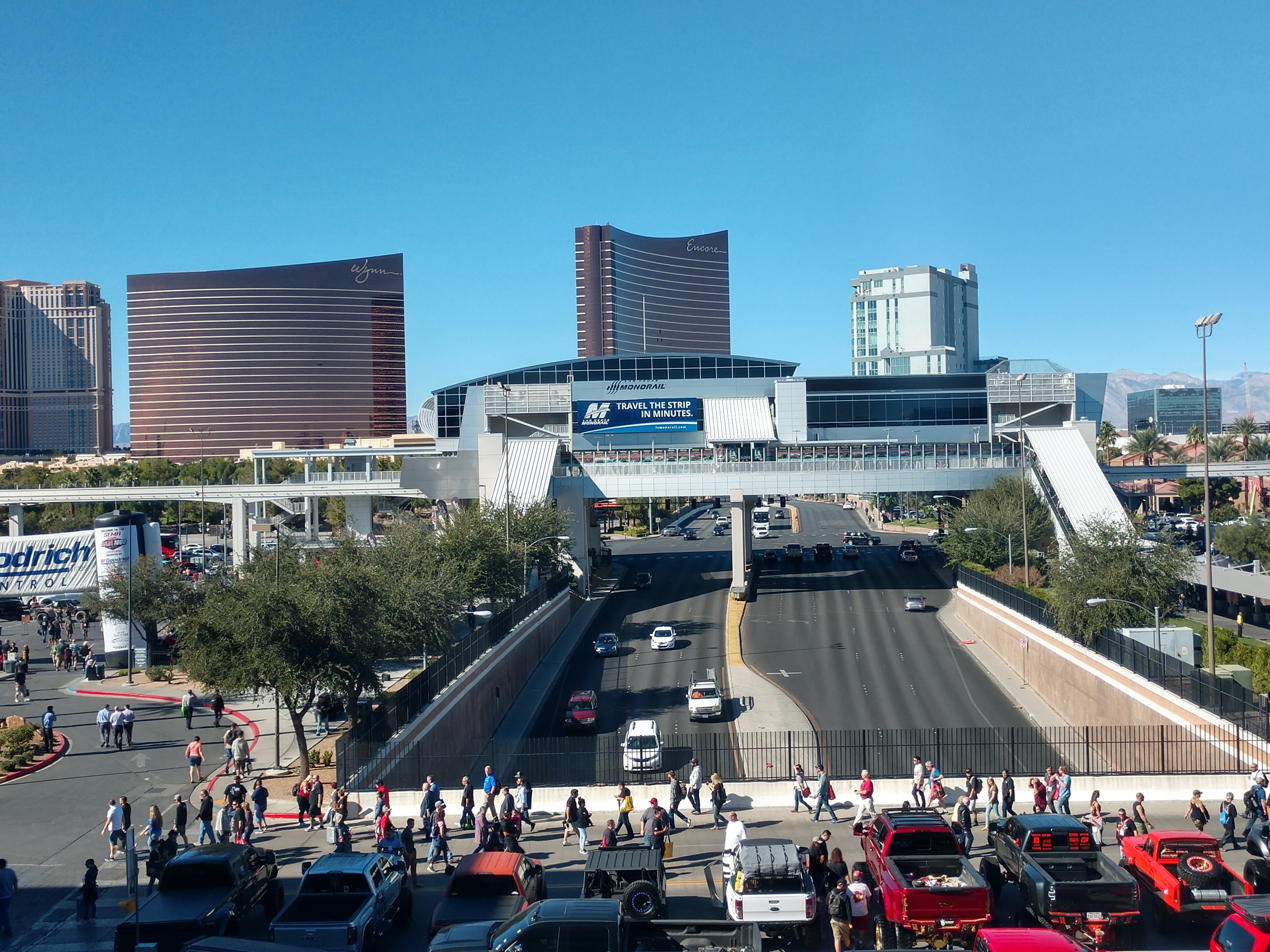
Las Vegas Monorail station above East Desert Inn Road, a loop connection

The Loop connects to the Las Vegas Monorail at the Convention Center station at the corner of Paradise Road and East Desert Inn Road at an Island above East Desert Inn Road. Buses that are near the Loop and Las Vegas Convention Center are the: RTC 108, RTC 119 and Las Vegas Deuce.

== Safety concerns ==
Workers have complained of chemical burns from the waste material generated by the tunneling process, and firefighters must decontaminate their equipment after conducting rescues from the project sites. The company was fined more than $112,000 ($118,031 in 2025) by Nevada's Occupational Safety and Health Administration in late 2023 after workers complained of "ankle-deep" water in the tunnels, muck spills, and burns.

In May 2026, Clark County commissioners approved revisions to safety requirements, upgrading building codes to address unique fire safety and suppression, and emergency ventilation and exit systems. The fire chief also acknowledged that the company's previously planned custom fire response vehicle, equipped with Teledyne FLIR's thermal imaging technology, had not been completed.

== Reception and usage ==
As of 2026, the Las Vegas Loop was the only such project; plans in the US and beyond, including Los Angeles, Washington, Chicago, San Jose, and Miami, were discontinued.

At peak times, the Loop was reported in 2026 to have a potential capacity of 33,600 people per day at 100% usage, with each Tesla car carrying the maximum four passengers. A typical wait of ten to fifteen minutes has been reported, and travel speed is not more than 30 mph (48 km/h). A daytime visit reported no passengers: "I'd been hoping to ask other Loop-riders what they made of the experience, but [...] there aren't any. I'm the only person here." At peak, the system might have 160 Teslas operating; however, at the time of the visit, there were just four, "which turns out to be three more than are needed."

Ben Leffel, an assistant professor of public policy at the University of Nevada, Las Vegas, said, "If you were to take what should be public transportation planning and turn it into a neoliberal nightmare, this is exactly what you would get". He told legislators at a meeting of the Nevada Regional Rail Transit Advisory Working Group that "The Loop by the Boring Company is the biggest, most absurd transit scam I have ever heard of [...] The Boring Company has been lying to policymakers all around the world that their form, which is Teslas in tunnels, can transport more people more quickly than any kind of rail [...] that is physically impossible. So, any policymaker that they're saying this to should challenge them to provide even a shred of material evidence that that is true, but they cannot."

== See also ==
- Transportation in Las Vegas
- Boring Test Tunnel
- Tunnel construction
- Hyperloop
- Gadgetbahn
- Dubai Loop
- Music City Loop
