= Music City Loop =

Planned tunnel in Nashville, Tennessee, US

Overview
- Location: Nashville, Tennessee
- Status: Under construction
- Start: Downtown Nashville
- End: Nashville International Airport

Operation
- Traffic: Automotive

The Music City Loop is an under construction underground transit tunnel system in Nashville, Tennessee, United States, that would connect downtown Nashville to the Nashville International Airport (airport code: BNA). The Boring Company initially planned to complete the project in 2026 at the earliest.

== Background ==
Prior to the announcement of the project, there had been a previous proposal to construct underground tunnels in and around downtown Nashville for the purpose of improving public transit. In 2018, voters rejected Let's Move Nashville, a comprehensive transit plan which would have included the construction of a 1.8 miles (2.9 km) light rail tunnel in downtown for $936 million.

On July 28, 2025, it was announced that The Boring Company intended to construct an approximately 10-mile (16 km) high-speed underground tunnel between downtown Nashville and the Nashville International Airport. The project had reportedly been in the works for some time, and was advertised as entirely privately funded, with the State of Tennessee provided right-of-way under state-maintained highways and leased land to the company free of charge. The tunnel was advertised to be able to shuttle passengers in Tesla vehicles, another company owned by Musk. The advertised travel time from Downtown Nashville to the Airport was 8 to 10 minutes, although The Boring Company's only operating tunnel, the Las Vegas Loop, is limited to 35 mph (56kph), which would require 17 minutes. If completed, the Music City Loop would be the longest tunnel system constructed by The Boring Company, which as of April 2026 had only built 4.54 miles of the planned 68 miles of tunnels in the Las Vegas Loop announced in 2019.

While the project was intended to run between downtown and BNA, The Boring Company announced partnerships with apartment complexes along Church Street for garage access for Tesla vehicles. During the 2026 legislative session, the Tennessee Legislature passed special legislation to remove regulatory authority from the city of Nashville and create a new state-appointed regulatory agency to oversee the construction of the promised Music City Loop.

== Routes and travel times ==
Trip	Distance	Travel time via Loop
Airport - Music City Center	8.5 miles	9 minutes
West End - River Front	2.0 miles	3 minutes
State Capital - Music City Center	1.0 miles	2 minutes
State Capital - Airport	9.5 miles	10 minutes

== Status of construction ==
The first phase was announced to be complete by the fall of 2026 at the earliest, with the goal of completion in two years.

As of February 2026, tunnelling had not yet begun, the permitting process had not been completed, and one of the boring machines had yet to be delivered.

In late February 2026, the company was cleared for construction by state and federal agencies.

As of August 2026, there were two machines tunnelling. In November 2026, a third was delivered. A fourth is scheduled to be launched by the end of 2026.

== Praise, criticisms and concerns ==
U.S. Transportation Secretary Sean Duffy toured the underground construction and praised the tunnel network as an innovative solution to mitigate Nashville's rapidly growing traffic congestion.

Tennessee Governor Bill Lee strongly endorsed the project, emphasizing that it is 100% privately funded by The Boring Company, and this project allows the city to gain massive public transit updates under a no-cost lease without adding a direct burden to local taxpayers.

On August 12, 2025, fifteen days after Music City Loop was first announced, the Nashville Banner reported that zero environmental studies, community outreach, impact measurement assessments, or vetting had taken place prior to its approval. The Boring Company later held interactive sessions (such as a Q&A on X) and began working through required local permits. It was also discovered that the Tennessee State Building Commission had leased state-owned land to The Boring Company for free, in addition to allowing The Boring Company to use the land for staging and a job fair prior to the start of the lease.

In November 2025, work crews at the planned entrance on Rosa Parks Boulevard walked off the job, citing nonpayment and reported OSHA violations to which The Boring Company had not responded.

The State of Tennessee's apparent pre-approval of the project created outrage among community members who have serious doubts as to the safety of burrowing in the limestone beneath the flood-prone city of Nashville and the impact construction will have on the surrounding communities, especially in light of the environmental impacts of the construction of The Boring Company's other project, the Las Vegas Loop.

Nashville Scene, in a three-part cover story on the Loop published in April 2026; interviewed Middle Tennessee State University professor, geoscientist Mark Abolins, who characterized the project "as very proprietary, very, very private, only releasing the information that they have to release."
