= The Boring Company =

American infrastructure and tunneling company

- Type: Private
- Industry: Construction
- Founded: January 11, 2017; 9 years ago
- Founder: Elon Musk
- Headquarters: Bastrop, Texas, United States
- Key people: Steve Davis (CEO and president)
- Owner: Elon Musk
- Number of employees: ~700 (2026)
- Website: boringcompany.com

The Boring Company (TBC) is an American infrastructure, tunnel construction service, and equipment company founded by Elon Musk. TBC was founded as a subsidiary of SpaceX in 2017, and was spun off as a separate corporation in 2018. The original Las Vegas Convention Center Loop (1.7 miles, three stations) opened in 2021. By late 2026 the Vegas Loop had expanded to roughly 14 operational stations (including Resorts World, Encore, Westgate, Fontainebleau, and Sahara) and had carried more than 4 million passengers. Clark County has approved up to 68 miles and more than 100 stations. A roughly two-mile Paradise Road twin-tunnel section was expected to open before the November 2026 Formula 1 race. The company has tested self-driving operation with a safety driver present. In September 2026 TBC raised a $3 billion Series D that valued the company at $23 billion.

Many other TBC projects in cities across the United States were announced, but subsequently became inactive or were canceled.

== History ==
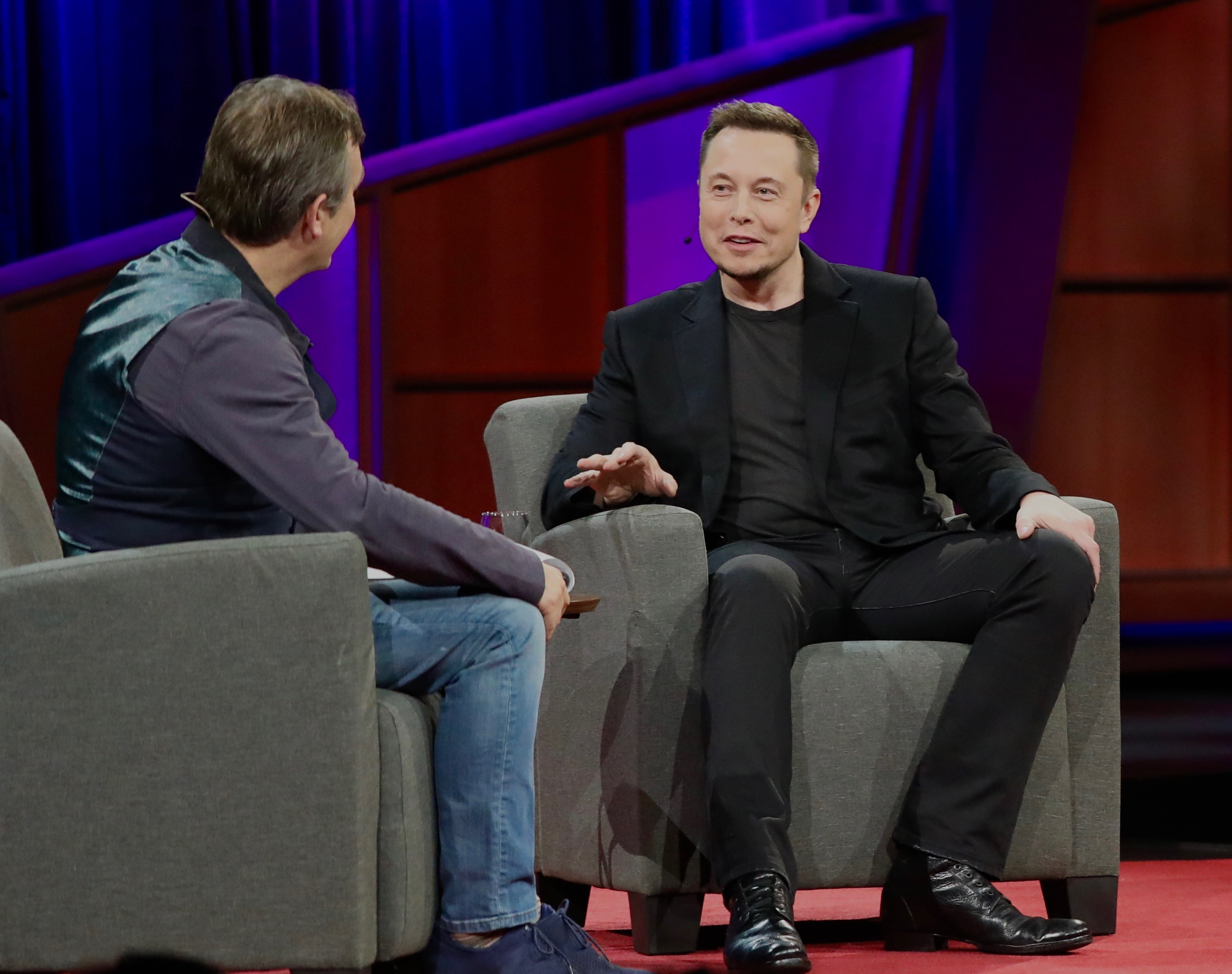
Elon Musk discusses the Boring Company at TED 2017.

Musk first announced the idea of the Boring Company in December 2016. It was registered as "TBC – The Boring Company" on January 11, 2017. Musk cited Los Angeles traffic and the limits of a two-dimensional road network as his inspiration for the project. The Boring Company was originally formed as a SpaceX subsidiary, but it was spun out into a separate corporate entity the following year. According to Musk, the company's goal is to increase tunneling speed and reduce its cost to the point that building a tunnel network under Los Angeles becomes financially feasible.

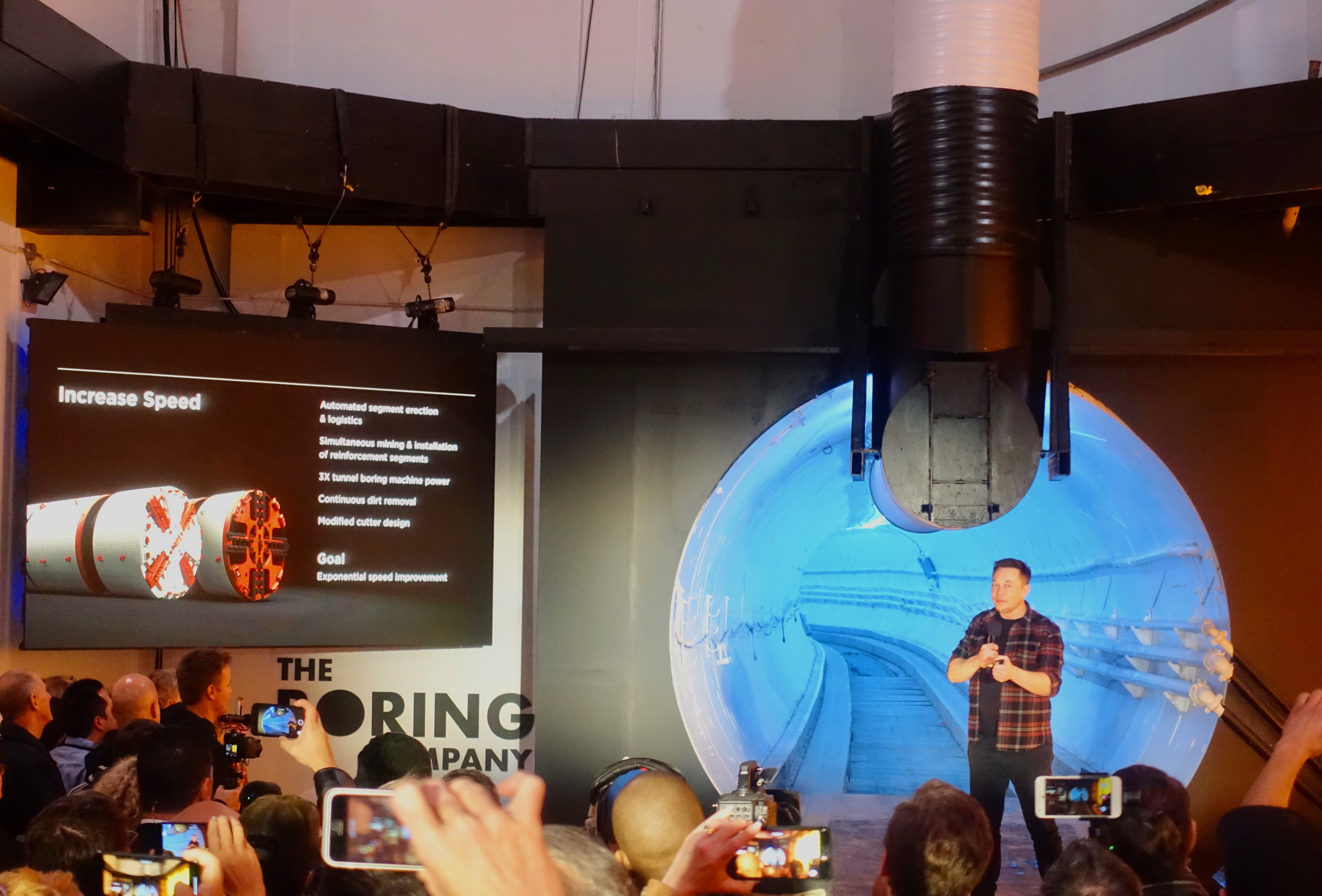
Elon Musk speaking at the inauguration of the test tunnel in Hawthorne, California, December 2018

After initial funding of US$113 million, mostly from Musk and supplemented by 2018 merchandise sales, the Boring Company sold $120 million in stock to venture capital firms in July 2019.

In early 2018, the company completed several tests in Hawthorne, California and showcased a test tunnel on December 18, 2018. It had initially intended to also build a test tunnel in Los Angeles, but canceled it at the end of the year in favor of a commercial tunnel to Dodger Stadium. However, in June of that year it won its first construction bid, a tunnel to connect downtown Chicago with O'Hare International Airport, although the project quickly died when Chicago's then-mayor, Rahm Emanuel, who had strongly advocated for it, chose not to seek reelection.

In May 2019, it won its first construction contract, a $48.6 bid to build a tunnel and provide transportation under the Las Vegas Convention Center. Despite earlier claims of intending to develop hyperloops, the company announced the transportation network would be run with electric cars. Musk defended his scaled-back ambitions, saying the rudimentary approach was "simple and just works." In November that year, Steve Davis, one of Musk's early hires at SpaceX, had become president of TBC. The company completed its Las Vegas tunnel, 1.7 miles (2.7 km) long, in 2021 and company began offering underground car rides to customers.

In 2021, TBC removed its planned Dodger Stadium tunnel from its website, as well as another planned tunnel between Baltimore and Washington, D.C. Both projects had been caught up in environmental review for several years.

In April 2022, the company announced an additional $675 million Series C funding round, valuing the company at approximately $5.675 billion. In September 2026 it raised a $3 billion Series D led by the United Arab Emirates and affiliated entities, valuing the company at $23 billion. The earlier Series C round was led by Vy Capital and Sequoia Capital, with participation from Valor Equity Partners, Founders Fund, 8VC, Craft Ventures, and DFJ Growth. In 2022, the company was cited by the Texas Commission on Environmental Quality for five violations of Texas environmental regulations.

By April 2023, the company had moved its headquarters and engineering facilities to Bastrop, Texas, approximately 25 miles (40 km) east of Texas Gigafactory.

SpaceX president Gwynne Shotwell has said that TBC's tunneling technology could be used to build homes on Mars, and Musk has suggested it could be used to develop future Mars settlements.

== Promotion ==
In 2018, the company raised several tens of millions of dollars by selling merchandise, including 50,000 baseball caps, 20,000 blowtorches marketed as "flamethrowers," and fire extinguishers.

In 2021, TBC held a student tunnel-boring competition in Las Vegas. Officially named the Not-a-Boring Competition, the challenge was to "quickly and accurately drill a tunnel that was 30 m-long (98 ft) and 30 cm-wide (0.98 ft)". 12 finalist teams competed; the winner was TUM Boring from Technical University of Munich. A second competition was held in April 2023, this time in Texas with 5 finalists. TUM Boring again won, achieving a maximum velocity of 7 mm/s (0.28 in/s).

== Machines ==
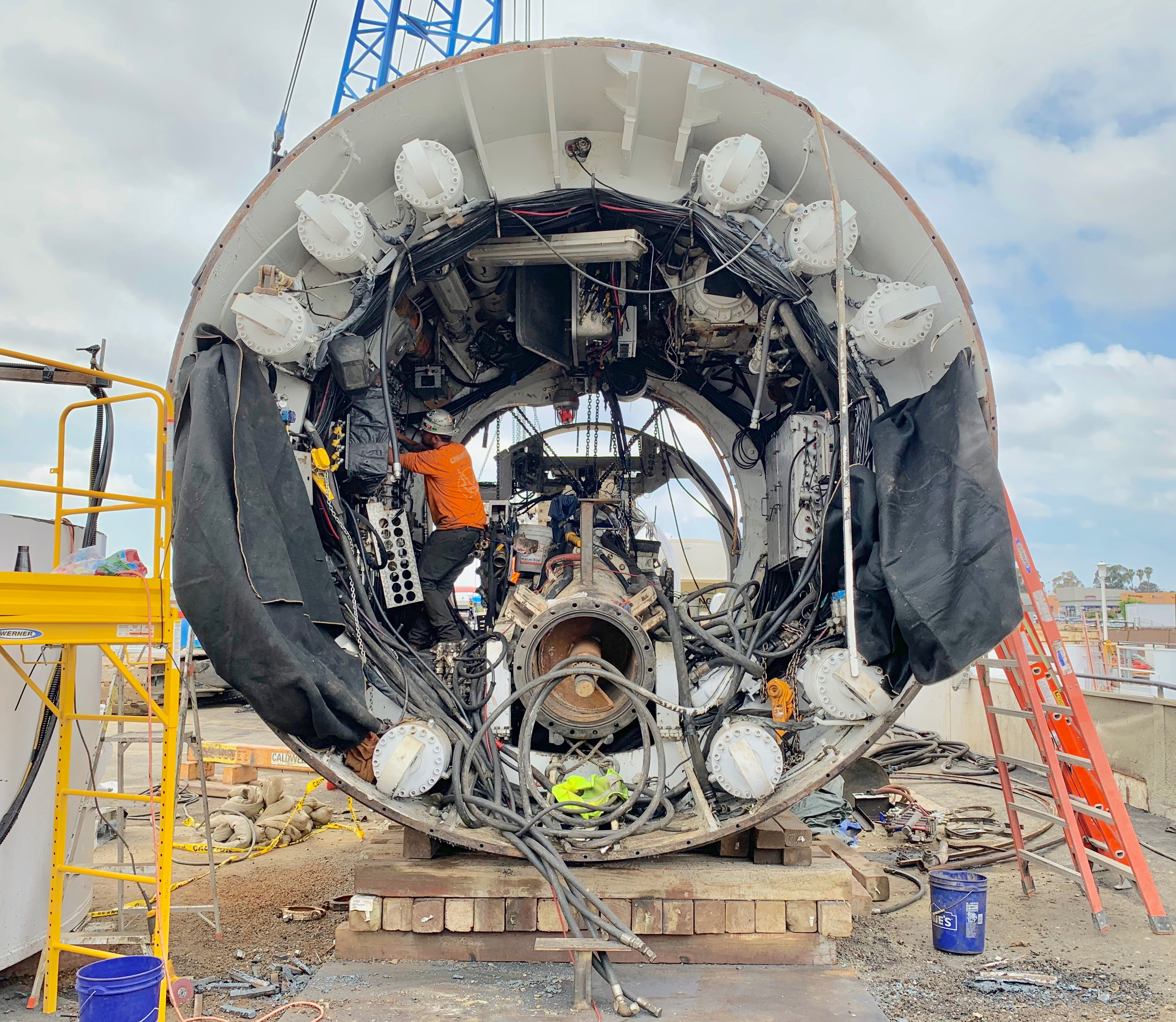
The boring machine in June 2019

TBC has operated a range of tunnel boring machines, some of which were purchased from third-party manufacturers and others designed in-house.

=== Godot ===
TBC's first boring machine was Godot, a conventional tunnel boring machine (TBM) made by the Canadian company Lovat, which it leased from Super Excavators of Wisconsin.

=== Prufrock ===
After Godot and a second second-hand machine, Linestorm, the company built its own machine, Prufrock. Prufrock is designed to mine continuously, installing the tunnel liner while it digs, and is remotely controlled from the company's operations center in Bastrop, Texas. The company says the machines get frequent on-site upgrades, usually designed, made and installed within 48 hours. In 2022 the company said Prufrock could dig up to a mile of tunnel per week.

==== Prufrock MB1 ====
Prufrock-MB ("Main Beam") is the hard-rock version of Prufrock, meant for rock strong enough to act as the tunnel lining itself. Prufrock-MB1 began tunnelling the limestone under Nashville for the Music City Loop in 2026.

==== Prufrock MB2 ====
Prufrock-MB2 is the second hard-rock Prufrock used on the Music City Loop. It arrived in Nashville in late April 2026, and as of June 2026 it was being commissioned ahead of a planned June launch.

==== Prufrock MB3 ====
In 2022 the company said its next-generation Prufrock would be able to dig up to seven miles per day. As of June 2026, Prufrock-MB3 was being built.

==== Liner Truck 3 ====
Liner Truck 3, introduced in August 2026, is a fully electric, remotely piloted vehicle that carries concrete liner segments to the boring machine. It uses Tesla Model 3 battery and drive units, carries more than 22,000 pounds (10.0 t) of segments, and has a range of 28 miles (45 km) and a top operating speed of 12 miles per hour (19 km/h).

== Process ==
=== Porpoising ===
"Porpoising" is meant to avoid digging large launch and retrieval pits. Prufrock arrives on a truck, tilts down and launches into the ground within 24 hours; at the end of the tunnel it comes back up to the surface and mines onto a trailer.

=== Tunnel lining ===
TBC introduced custom hexagonal tunnel-lining segments in its Porpoise Test 5 tunnel in Bastrop, Texas. TBC says Prufrock builds each tunnel ring fully autonomously: six concrete segments of about 3,750 lb each are lifted, translated and placed into final position in under a minute, monitored remotely from the company's Global OCC in Texas. Segments are carried to the machine by a fully electric, remotely piloted liner truck; the latest version, Liner Truck 3, uses Tesla Model 3 battery and drive units.

=== Continuous tunneling ===
Most soft-soil tunnel boring machines mine about five feet, stop, erect the precast concrete tunnel liner, and then start over. TBC says Prufrock is designed to install the liner while it mines, so the machine does not have to stop every five feet. In August 2024, NextBigFuture reported that Prufrock 3 and Prufrock 4 could tunnel only about 11 hours per day, citing maintenance and the stops to place concrete segments as limits.

=== Muck removal ===
TBC uses a continuous conveyor, the Vertical Cassette (VC), to transport excavated material ("muck") from the tunnel boring machine to the surface.

TBC says its latest version, VC7, introduced in August 2026, has a maximum muck conveyance rate of 990 tons/hour (with a 50% loaded belt) and supports a maximum TBM advance rate of 4 miles/week. The belt speed is 660 ft/minute and the minimum radius of curvature is 500 ft. TBC says "Belt Boosters" every 1.5 miles allow unlimited tunnel length.

== Active projects ==
=== Hawthorne test tunnel ===
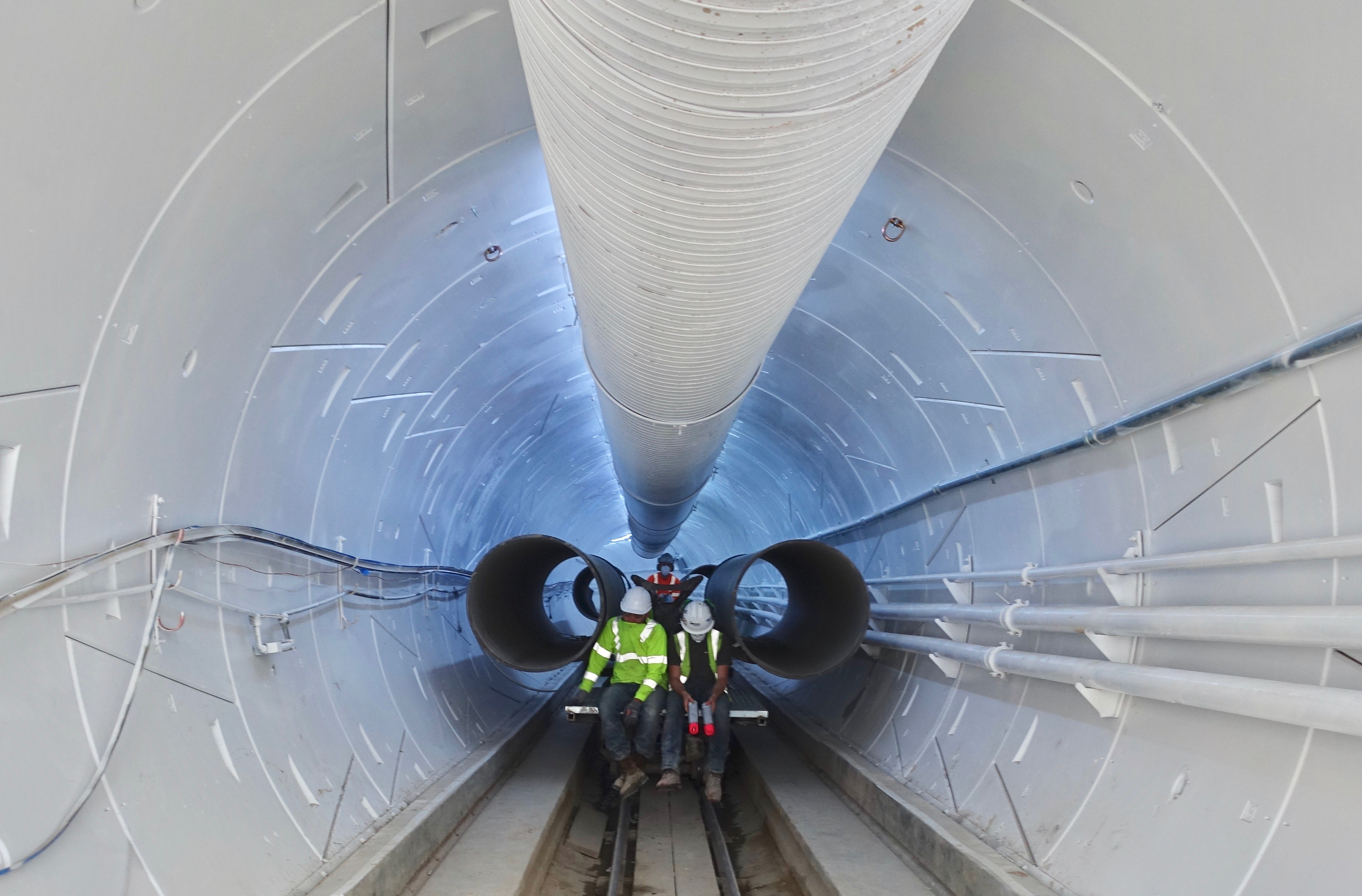
Tunnel built in Hawthorne, December 2018

The Hawthorne test tunnel, or Boring test tunnel, is a 1.14 miles (1.83 km) tunnel in Hawthorne, California, intended for testing “tunneling and public transportation systems”, constructed between 2016 and 2018. It was accompanied by a mile-long aboveground tube on nearby Jack Northrop Ave designed for testing hyperloop and loop-based transportation, which was used for student competitions in 2018 and 2019 before being dismantled in 2022.

=== Vegas Loop ===
The Vegas Loop, originally known as the Las Vegas Convention Center Loop (LVCC Loop), is a car tunnel system that serves the Las Vegas Convention Center, area hotels and attractions, and Harry Reid International Airport. Operating since 2021, the system uses Tesla Model Y vehicles to shuttle passengers among nine stations. The Boring Company began construction in November 2019 and has continued intermittent tunnel drilling for planned stations. When completed, the company projects that the Loop will include 68 miles of tunnels and 123 stations.

By late 2026 the Vegas Loop had expanded to roughly 14 operational stations, including the original Las Vegas Convention Center stations and stops at Resorts World, Encore, Westgate, Fontainebleau, and Sahara. The system had carried more than 4 million passengers. Clark County has approved up to 68 miles of tunnel and more than 100 stations.

A roughly two-mile twin-tunnel extension under Paradise Road (University Center Loop), running between the Westgate and a site near UNLV at 4744 Paradise Road, was expected to open before the November 19–21, 2026 Formula 1 Las Vegas Grand Prix. The extension was planned to add stations at 4744 Paradise, Virgin Hotels Las Vegas, and a former Gordon Biersch site. Las Vegas Convention and Visitors Authority CEO Steve Hill stated in October 2026 that both tunnels were expected to open simultaneously ahead of the race. The company has tested self-driving operation in the tunnels with a safety driver present. Rides are provided by Tesla vehicles.

=== Dubai Loop ===
In 2026 the company signed a construction contract with Dubai’s Roads and Transport Authority for a pilot phase of 6.4 km of tunnel and four stations. Construction is planned to begin in late 2026. The September 2026 Series D is tied to a broader UAE partnership that includes plans for more than 150 km of tunnels.

=== Music City Loop ===
The Music City Loop is an under construction underground transit tunnel system in Nashville, Tennessee, United States, that would connect downtown Nashville to the Nashville International Airport (airport code: BNA). The Boring Company initially planned to complete the project in 2026 at the earliest.

A privately funded system intended to connect downtown Nashville (including Music City Center and Lower Broadway) with West End Avenue and Nashville International Airport. Tunneling began in early 2026 after state permits. As of early October 2026, Prufrock-MB1 and MB2 were mining simultaneously; MB3 was preparing for a late-October launch and MB4 was under construction. The company stated that more than 40 other sites were in various stages of planning and design. The Nashville's Metro Council and the Southern Environmental Law Center had previously raised concerns regarding the project's environmental impact, safety, transparency, and accountability mechanisms. The company has identified a launch shaft site at 500 Lafayette Street and has received approvals related to airport and convention-center stations.

=== Universal Orlando ===
In 2025, the Shingle Creek Transit and Utility Community Development District began exploring proposals for a transportation system linking the Epic Universe theme park with other Universal Orlando properties along International Drive and near Interstate 4. In February 2026, the district voted to begin contract negotiations with The Boring Company regarding a proposed underground transit system modeled after the Vegas Loop.

== Inactive and cancelled projects ==
=== United States ===
==== Washington, DC to Baltimore, Maryland ====
In 2017, Musk announced plans to build a Hyperloop connecting Washington, DC to Baltimore. This was supplanted in 2018 by a proposal to build a route following the Baltimore–Washington Parkway. The Maryland Transportation Authority officially approved the project. In 2019, a draft Environmental Assessment for the project was completed. As of 2021, the project was no longer listed on the company website, the federal government had received no indication the company wanted to move forward, TBC dropped a Maryland lobbyist it had hired for the project, and the company declined to comment on the project.

==== Chicago, Illinois ====
In 2018, the company won a bid to build a high-speed link from downtown Chicago to O'Hare Airport, to be known as the Chicago Express Loop. As of 2021, the plan had been dropped.

==== Los Angeles, California ====
In 2018, TBC proposed to develop a 2.7-mile-long (4.3 km) test tunnel on a north–south alignment parallel to Interstate 405 and adjacent to Sepulveda Boulevard. Public opposition and lawsuits led the company to abandon the idea. Also in 2018, the company proposed to build a 3.6-mile (5.8 km) tunnel called the "Dugout Loop" from Vermont Avenue to Dodger Stadium. As of June 2021, the project had been removed from TBC's website.

==== San Jose, California ====
In 2019, a link between San Jose International Airport and Diridon station, was discussed as an alternative to an $800 million traditional rail link. Plans were later dropped.

==== San Bernardino County, California ====
In February 2021, the San Bernardino County Transportation Authority (SBCTA) in California approved beginning contract negotiations with TBC to build a nearly 4-mile (6.4 km) tunnel connecting the Ontario airport with the Rancho Cucamonga Metrolink/Future Brightline West train station. However, TBC did not submit a proposal after a third party was involved to study the project impacts. As of 2022, the SBCTA has plans to build the tunnel system using "another company more familiar with the state's bureaucracy to do the Environmental Impact Report".

==== Fort Lauderdale, Florida ====
In July 2021, Fort Lauderdale, Florida, accepted a proposal from the Boring Company for a tunnel between downtown and the beach, to be dubbed the "Las Olas Loop". In August 2021, the city was beginning final negotiations with TBC, and Mayor Dean Trantalis estimated the total cost of the 5-mile (8.0 km) round-trip tunnel would be between $90 and $100 million, including stations. As of December 2022, the city suspended efforts to continue the project.

==== San Antonio, Texas ====
Bexar County selected The Boring Company to build a transit link between downtown San Antonio, Texas and San Antonio International Airport in March 2022, but was then "ghosted" by the company.

==== Miami, Florida ====
In February 2021, Miami mayor Francis Suarez revealed that Musk had proposed to dig a two-mile tunnel under the Miami River for $30 million, within a six-month timescale, compared with $1 billion over four years estimated by the local transit authority. Much of the savings would be achieved by simplifying ventilation systems and allowing only electric vehicles. As of November 2023, the city is waiting for the Miami Dade Transportation Planning Organization to complete an analysis of the project.

==== Cameron County, Texas ====
In August 2021, a preliminary concept discussion was held with officials of Cameron County on the potential construction of a tunnel from South Padre Island to Boca Chica Beach in South Texas. If built, the tunnel would be required to pass beneath the Brownsville Ship Channel. It would allow SpaceX's facilities at Starbase to remain accessible if Highway 4, its sole access road, was closed.

=== Australia ===
==== Blue Mountains ====
In January 2019, Musk responded to a tweet by an Australian member of parliament regarding a tunnel through the Blue Mountains to the west of Sydney, suggesting costs of $750 million for a 31-mile (50 km) tunnel, plus $50 million per station. New South Wales' transportation department found that based on the cost of the Hawthorne tunnel, the estimated cost would be closer to $6 billion.

== Criticism ==
Civil engineering experts and tunneling industry veterans questioned whether TBC could render tunnels faster and cheaper than competitors. An editor's note in Tunnelling Journal dismissed Musk's Las Vegas tunnels as a "vanity project". Public transit consultant Jarrett Walker wrote that the tunnels' capacity was "so low that it couldn't possibly be relevant to the volume of travel in a big city".

Musk's planned tunnels were criticized for lacking such safety features as emergency exit corridors, ventilation systems, or fire suppression. In addition, the single lane tunnels left it impossible for vehicles to pass one another in the event of collision, mechanical failure, or other traffic obstruction, and instead would shut down the entire tunnel section.

James Moore, director of transportation engineering at the University of Southern California, said that "there are cheaper ways to provide better transportation for large numbers of people", such as managing traffic with tolls. Public transit consultant Jarrett Walker called TBC "wildly hyped", and criticized how the company "dazzled city governments and investors with visions of an efficient subway where you never have to get out of your car, [but turned] out to be a paved road tunnel".

== See also ==
- Underground construction
