= Moweaqua, Illinois =

Moweaqua
- Village
- Location of Moweaqua in Shelby and Christian Counties, Illinois.
- Coordinates: 39°37′21″N 89°01′10″W
- Country: United States
- State: Illinois
- County: Shelby, Christian

Area
  - Total: 2.30 sq mi (5.95 km^{2})
  - Land: 2.30 sq mi (5.95 km^{2})
  - Water: 0 sq mi (0.00 km^{2})
- Elevation: 633 ft (193 m)

Population (2020)
  - Total: 1,764
  - Density: 767.6/sq mi (296.37/km^{2})
- Time zone: UTC-6 (CST)
  - Summer (DST): UTC-5 (CDT)
- ZIP code: 62550
- Area code: 217
- FIPS code: 17-51232
- GNIS ID: 2399420
- Website: moweaqua.org

Moweaqua is a village in Shelby and Christian counties, Illinois, United States. The population was 1,764 at the 2020 census.

== History ==
Moweaqua was named after a small stream 1.5 miles south of the station, called by the Indians Moweaqua, a Pottawatamie word that means "she that weeps". From 1891 until 1935, Moweaqua was the site of a gassy coal mine that mined coal from Pennsylvanian strata. On the morning of December 24, 1932, fifty-four coal miners, the entire day shift, were killed by a methane gas explosion in the Moweaqua coal mine disaster. The incident occurred on the morning of Christmas Eve, and one of the deceased miners, Tom Jackson, had been scheduled to play Santa Claus in a party to be held that evening for his fellow townspeople. The tragic explosion, together with the election in the previous month (November 1932) of the pro-labor Seventy-Third Congress, led to the passage of mine safety legislation and the phaseout of open-flame carbide miner's lanterns in United States coal mines. The Moweaqua Coal Mine Museum opened in 1986 to commemorate local coal miners, especially the victims of this disaster.

The 2009 movie The Informant! starring Matt Damon was partially filmed in Moweaqua. The plot of the movie is based on the ADM price fixing scandal which occurred during the 1990s.

== Geography ==
According to the 2021 census gazetteer files, Moweaqua has a total area of 2.30 square miles (5.96 km^{2}), all land.

== Demographics ==
Historical population
Census	Pop.	Note	%±
1880	673		—
1890	848		26.0%
1900	1,478		74.3%
1910	1,513		2.4%
1920	1,591		5.2%
1930	1,478		−7.1%
1940	1,366		−7.6%
1950	1,475		8.0%
1960	1,614		9.4%
1970	1,687		4.5%
1980	1,922		13.9%
1990	1,785		−7.1%
2000	1,923		7.7%
2010	1,831		−4.8%
2020	1,764		−3.7%
U.S. Decennial Census

=== 2020 census ===
As of the 2020 census, Moweaqua had a population of 1,764 and 598 families residing in the village. The median age was 44.7 years. 21.4% of residents were under the age of 18 and 23.7% of residents were 65 years of age or older. For every 100 females there were 90.7 males, and for every 100 females age 18 and over there were 86.8 males age 18 and over.

0.0% of residents lived in urban areas, while 100.0% lived in rural areas.

There were 742 households in Moweaqua, of which 25.9% had children under the age of 18 living in them. Of all households, 53.2% were married-couple households, 15.5% were households with a male householder and no spouse or partner present, and 25.7% were households with a female householder and no spouse or partner present. About 28.4% of all households were made up of individuals and 15.2% had someone living alone who was 65 years of age or older.

The population density was 767.62 inhabitants per square mile (296.38/km^{2}). There were 817 housing units at an average density of 355.53 per square mile (137.27/km^{2}), of which 9.2% were vacant. The homeowner vacancy rate was 3.1% and the rental vacancy rate was 15.8%.

Racial composition as of the 2020 census
Race	Number	Percent
White	1,692	95.9%
Black or African American	16	0.9%
American Indian and Alaska Native	6	0.3%
Asian	7	0.4%
Native Hawaiian and Other Pacific Islander	0	0.0%
Some other race	6	0.3%
Two or more races	37	2.1%
Hispanic or Latino (of any race)	24	1.4%

=== Income and poverty ===
The median income for a household in the village was $61,250, and the median income for a family was $76,000. Males had a median income of $48,882 versus $25,294 for females. The per capita income for the village was $26,487. About 10.2% of families and 10.4% of the population were below the poverty line, including 7.6% of those under age 18 and 7.5% of those age 65 or over.

== Education ==
Moweaqua is served by the Central A&M School District, which was established in 1993, and also includes the city of Assumption as well as the nearby rural areas. Central A&M High School (grades 9–12) and Gregory Intermediate School (3–5) are located in one building on the northern edge of Moweaqua. The high school enrollment is approximately 300 students, and their teams are known as the Raiders. The Central A&M FFA Chapter is also a successful chapter in section, district and State FFA Events, as well as community service activities.

== Notable people ==
- Brett Adcock, CEO of Figure AI
- Cecil Coombs, outfielder for the Chicago White Sox
- Tom Candy Ponting, cattleman who drove the first herd of cattle from Texas to New York City
