= Minitran =

Minitran is a commercial psychiatric drug used as a tranquilliser and antidepressant. It is manufactured in Greece by Adelco S.A. and sold in form of yellow-coloured sugar-coated tablets.

It contains Amitriptyline hydrochloride and Perphenazine.

It is sold in the following forms:

- Minitran 2-10: 2 mg Perphenazine and 10 mg Amitriptyline hydrochloride in each tablet.
- Minitran 2-25: 2 mg Perphenazine and 25 mg Amitriptyline hydrochloride in each tablet.
- Minitran 4-10: 4 mg Perphenazine and 10 mg Amitriptyline hydrochloride in each tablet.
- Minitran 4-25: 4 mg Perphenazine and 25 mg Amitriptyline hydrochloride in each tablet.

Minitran is also a pharmaceutical drug for the treatment of Angina, manufactured by 3M.

It contains glyceryl trinitrate and is sold in patch form. It is sold in the following strengths:

- Minitran 5 contains 18 mg of glyceryl trinitrate and delivers 5 mg in 24 hours
- Minitran 10: contains 36 mg of glyceryl trinitrate and delivers 10 mg in 24 hours
- Minitran 15: contains 54 mg of glyceryl trinitrate and delivers 15 mg in 24 hours

It is also marketed as Discotrine in some countries.

== See also ==
- List of psychiatric drugs
- Psychiatry
