= Figure AI =

American robotics company

Figure AI, Inc.
- Type: Private
- Industry: Information technology Robotics; Artificial intelligence
- Founded: 2022; 4 years ago
- Founders: Brett Adcock
- Headquarters: San Jose, California, U.S.
- Products: Figure 01; Figure 02; Figure 03
- Number of employees: 600
- Website: www.figure.ai

Figure AI, Inc. is an American robotics company developing humanoid robots that operate via artificial intelligence. The company was founded in 2022 by Brett Adcock. As of late 2025, the company had a $39 billion valuation.

Three generations of humanoid robots (Figure 01–03) have been developed, as well as two iterations of a vision–language–action model (Helix 01–02), which can control up to two robots at once. By 2026, the robots demonstrated the potential ability to perform household work and the company gained publicity when a Figure 03 appeared at a White House event.

Figure AI robot package handling

== History ==
Figure AI was founded in 2022 by Brett Adcock, also known for founding Archer Aviation, Vettery and Hark. That year, the company introduced its prototype, Figure 01, a bipedal robot designed for manual labor, initially targeting the logistics and warehousing sectors. The initial model utilized external cabling for easier maintenance. In May 2023, Figure AI raised $70 million from investors including Adcock, who invested $20 million, and Parkway Venture Capital. In January 2024, Figure AI announced a partnership with BMW to deploy humanoid robots in automotive manufacturing facilities.

In February 2024, Figure AI secured $675 million in venture capital funding from a consortium that includes Jeff Bezos, Microsoft, Nvidia, Intel, and the startup-funding divisions of Amazon and OpenAI; the company was then valued at $2.6 billion. Figure AI also announced a partnership with OpenAI, which would build specialized artificial intelligence (AI) models for Figure AI's humanoid robots, enabling its robots to process language; the collaboration ended after a year, with Adcock stating that large language models had become a smaller problem compared to those allowing for "high rate robot control".

In August 2024, the company introduced Figure 02, describing it as the next step toward deploying humanoids for industrial use. Its five-fingered hands have 16 degrees of freedom (DOF) and the ability to carry up to 25 kilograms (55 lb). The model is equipped with cabling integrated into the limbs, a torso-placed battery, six RGB cameras, and an onboard vision–language–action (VLA) model. It has three times the computing power (including inference AI) of the previous model, including two graphics processing units, supported by Nvidia. Microphones, speakers, and custom AI models (developed with OpenAI) enable communication with humans.

In early 2025, Figure AI announced BotQ, a manufacturing facility aiming to produce 12,000 humanoids per year with the help of its own humanoid robots, and Helix, a VLA model that can control up to two robots at once. Helix enables a robot to interact with the world without extensive manual training, according to the company allowing it to pick up nearly any small household object. By April, the company issued cease-and-desist letters to at least two secondary brokers promoting its private stock without authorization. In September, a third round of financing exceeded $1 billion, raising the company's total valuation to $39 billion. Investors included Brookfield Asset Management, Intel, Macquarie Capital, Nvidia, Parkway Venture Capital, Qualcomm, Salesforce, and T-Mobile.

In October 2025, Figure 03 was introduced. Standing 5 1/2 feet (1.7 meters) tall, the machine has 60 total DOF, including 20 for each hand. According to the company, its hardware and software redesign aims to create a general-purpose robot able to learn directly from humans. An upgraded camera system delivers twice the frame rate, a quarter the latency, and a 60% wider field of view, in addition to a camera in each hand. Tactile sensors in the fingertips can detect forces as little as 3 grams (0.1 oz). It incorporates soft materials and a protected battery for safety, as well as removable, washable textiles. It supports wireless inductive charging.

In November 2025, the former head of product safety sued the company on the basis of being fired for raising the concern that the company's robots were strong enough to fracture a human skull. By early 2026, Figure 02 had been used in demonstrations showing that it could load a washing machine, sort packages, and fold laundry. That January, Helix 02 was released, expanding the AI model to the entire body to allow for functional autonomy. A Helix 02–powered Figure 02 was shown to be capable of loading and unloading a dishwasher, based on hours of motion-capture data and simulation-based machine learning. In March, U.S. First Lady Melania Trump appeared at the White House with a Figure 03, promoting the presumptive eventual ability of AI to teach children.

By April 2026, the company had delivered over 350 Figure 03 models and increased its production output to one robot every hour. That May, Adcock stated that the company would soon lease the robot for domestic use for around $600 a month and announced that the Figure 04 design had been locked. Additionally, a group of Figure 03 robots was livestreamed processing packages for almost a full week, inspiring a 10-hour competition between their product and a person; the robot performed 98.5% as well as the human. By the end of June 2026, the company had about 740 robots operating, as opposed to only 600 humans. That August, Adcock shared a video of a Figure 03 climbing a short ladder. In September, most of the outdated Figure 02s were destroyed by being molten down in arc furnaces (to protect details of their proprietary hardware), suggested by Arnold Schwarzenegger, whose character shares a similar fate in Terminator 2: Judgment Day. An arc furnace at the Ovako's steel mill in Imatra, Finland was used to melt down the robots.

In late August 2026, the company launched a gig economy platform called Index to capture work data from humans wearing sensors, expected to cost $1 billion over the next year. The next month, Figure AI announced that it would spend upwards of $3.5 billion on Nvidia GPUs by the next year.

== See also ==
- List of robotics companies
- List of robots
