= Adam Goldstein =

Adam Goldstein may refer to:

- Adam Michael Goldstein (1973–2009), American disk jockey professionally known as DJ AM
- Adam Goldstein (author) (born 1988), American technical author
- Adam Goldstein (technology executive), co-founder of Archer Aviation
