= Jetex (company) =

UAE aviation company

- Industry: Aviation
- Founded: 2005
- Founder: Adel Mardini
- Headquarters: Dubai United Arab Emirates
- Key people: Adel Mardini (CEO)
- Number of employees: 750
- Website: www.jetex.com

Jetex is a private aviation and flight support company based in Dubai United Arab Emirates. The company has 38 fixed-base operators (FBOs) and ground handling stations in over 50 locations around the world, including the Middle East, Europe, Asia Pacific, Africa, and the Americas.

Jetex provides FBOs, ground handling, aircraft fueling, international trip planning, and concierge services.

== History ==
=== 2005–2010 ===
Jetex was launched in November 2005 by Adel Mardini, a businessman, founder and CEO of Jetex at the Dubai Airshow. The company focused on flight support and arranging charter flights. In February 2009, Jetex opened its first FBO facility at Paris-Le Bourget Airport.

In 2010, Jetex launched its Asian operations with the opening of a 24/7 operations center at Beijing Capital Airport. A new facility was also opened at Kyiv International Airport (Zhuliany) in Ukraine to oversee CIS operations.

=== 2012–2015 ===
In October 2012, the company expanded into the Americas market, by supplying fuel to international operators and domestic airports in Brazil. In May 2013, the company signed an agreement with Honeywell to re-sell the technology company's Global Data Center flight support services. In turn, Honeywell customers offered Jetex's international trip-planning services.

In November 2013, the Jetex FBO at Dubai World Central (now rebranded as Dubai South) entered an agreement with Bentley Motors Middle East three Bentley Mulsanne cars for its chauffeured luxury car transportation.

In October 2014, the company expanded to the United States with the opening of an Operations Center in Miami, Florida. In 2015, Jetex partnered with JetSmarter to operate most of JetSmarter's global charter flights via Jetex facilities.

In May 2015, Jetex established an FBO at Comodoro Arturo Merino Benítez International Airport, in collaboration with Chile's Santiago FBO. In November 2015, the company launched an FBO in Toluca, Mexico. In the same year, it opened a new Ground Support Station at Haneda Airport in Tokyo, Japan.

=== 2016–2018 ===
In early 2016, the company launched the world's first Rolls-Royce airside shuttle service at its FBO Terminal in Dubai, UAE. In 2016, Jetex opened an FBO Terminal in Marseille, France in Casablanca and Marrakech (Morocco) and a big FBO Terminal at Dubai South.

In May 2017, Jetex opened three new ground handling facilities in Spain. The company also announced its entry into the Brazilian market with the first private terminal and FBO at São Paulo Guarulhos Airport, in partnership with CFly Aviation. Jetex also entered the Omani market with the appointment to manage and operate the first-ever FBOs in the country in Muscat and Salalah.

In April 2018, Jetex formed a partnership with Wright Electric, an American company specializing in building electric aircraft. The partnership made Jetex the first general aviation company to support electric aircraft for short-haul flights. The same month, the company's FBO at Rome-Ciampino International Airport commenced full operations. In 2018, Jetex Abidjan, the first FBO in Abidjan, Ivory Coast, become fully operational. Jetex started work as a dealer of HondaJet in the Gulf and Middle East region.

=== 2019–2022 ===
In January 2019, Jetex São Paulo began operations at the São Paulo–Guarulhos International Airport. By April 2019, Jetex added a third location in Japan at Osaka Kansai International Airport.

In February 2020, Jetex opened North Africa's first private jet terminal at Marrakesh Menara Airport, bringing its total number of locations in Africa to 16.

During the COVID-19 pandemic, Jetex, adapted to increased demand for charter flights and hygiene-focused services. According to Gulf Business, the company introduced measures like contactless procedures and aircraft disinfection to address health concerns among travelers.

In 2021, Jetex signed an agreement with Falcon Aviation to manage its FBO and hangar at Al Maktoum International Airport in Dubai.

In August 2021, the company started expanded its operations in Latin America with new locations in Argentina, Colombia, and Peru. At the same year, the company announced partnerships with JetClub to expand its HondaJet fractional ownership program, and with Eve, an Embraer Company, to deploy and operate urban air mobility (UAM) taxi systems.

In January 2022, the company partnered with Berlin Neuhardenberg Airport to develop the world's first Pure Green Fixed Base Operator (FBO) in Berlin.

In February, Jetex also launched a new FBO facility at Singapore's Seletar International Airport in partnership with Bombardier.

In 2020–2022, Jetex received multiple awards at the World Travel Awards, including World's Leading FBO Brand, World's Leading FBO Terminal (for its VIP Terminal in Oman in 2019-2020 and for its Jetex Paris location in 2022), World's Leading FBO Jet Terminal (for its location in Paris in 2021), World's Leading Private Jet Travel Experience, etc.

=== 2023–present ===
In January 2023, Jetex entered the UK market with an FBO at dedicated business aviation gateway London Biggin Hill Airport (EGKB).

In May 2023, Jetex introduces Sustainable Aviation Fuel Book and Claim with 360 Jet Fuel Ltd.

In October 2023, Jetex won Middle East's Leading FBO Terminal and World's Best FBO Brand Website at the World Travel Awards 2023.

In November 2023, Jetex and Shell Aviation sign agreement for SAF Supply To Private Aviation. In the same month, Jetex announced the unveiling of a new flagship private terminal in Abu Dhabi's Al Bateen Executive Airport.

In 2025, Jetex was one of the official sponsors of the European Business Aviation Convention & Exhibition (EBACE) of the 2025 edition of the event, along with Falcon Luxe and Avinode. Jetex was the official registration sponsor, welcoming attendees with branded lanyards and guiding them with venue-wide truss banners.

In June 2025, Jetex and Archer Aviation announced a strategic partnership to integrate Archer’s Midnight eVTOL aircraft into daily operations across Jetex's international portfolio of 40 private aircraft terminals in more than 30 countries. The strategic partnership remains conditional, subject to the execution of further definitive agreements and the satisfaction of certain conditions.
