= Denis Machuel =

French business executive (born 1964)

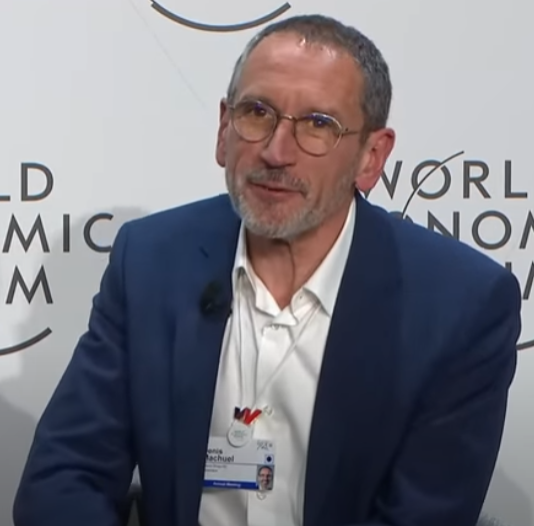
- Speaking at the 2023 World Economic Forum
- Born: 19 April 1964 (age 61); Reims, France
- Education: ENSIMAG; Texas A&M University
- Occupation: Business executive

Denis Machuel (born 19 April 1964) is a French business executive. He is currently the CEO of The Adecco Group, a Human Resources services company.

== Early life ==
Born in 1964 in Reims, Machuel receives an undergraduate degree and a graduate degree from the École nationale supérieure d'informatique et de mathématiques appliquées de Grenoble College of Engineering in Grenoble, France. He also holds a master's degree from Texas A&M University.

== Career ==
Machuel began his career at Schneider Electric in Egypt, before becoming a consultant at Dassault Electronique.

In 1991, he joined Altran as a consultant. He spent 16 years with the company, becoming the CEO of Altran Technologies UK Royaume-Uni, before leading the company's global offshoring activity.

He joined Sodexo in 2007 and became CEO of the company's Benefits & Rewards Services entity and member of the company's executive committee in 2014. In 2017, he was appointed deputy CEO and chief digital officer.

He became CEO of the Sodexo group, replacing Michel Landel, in January 2018.

In May 2022, the Adecco Group announced that it has recruited Machuel as a CEO of the group. On 1 July 2022, he replaced Alain Dehaze.
