= Brett Adcock =

American technology entrepreneur (born 1986)

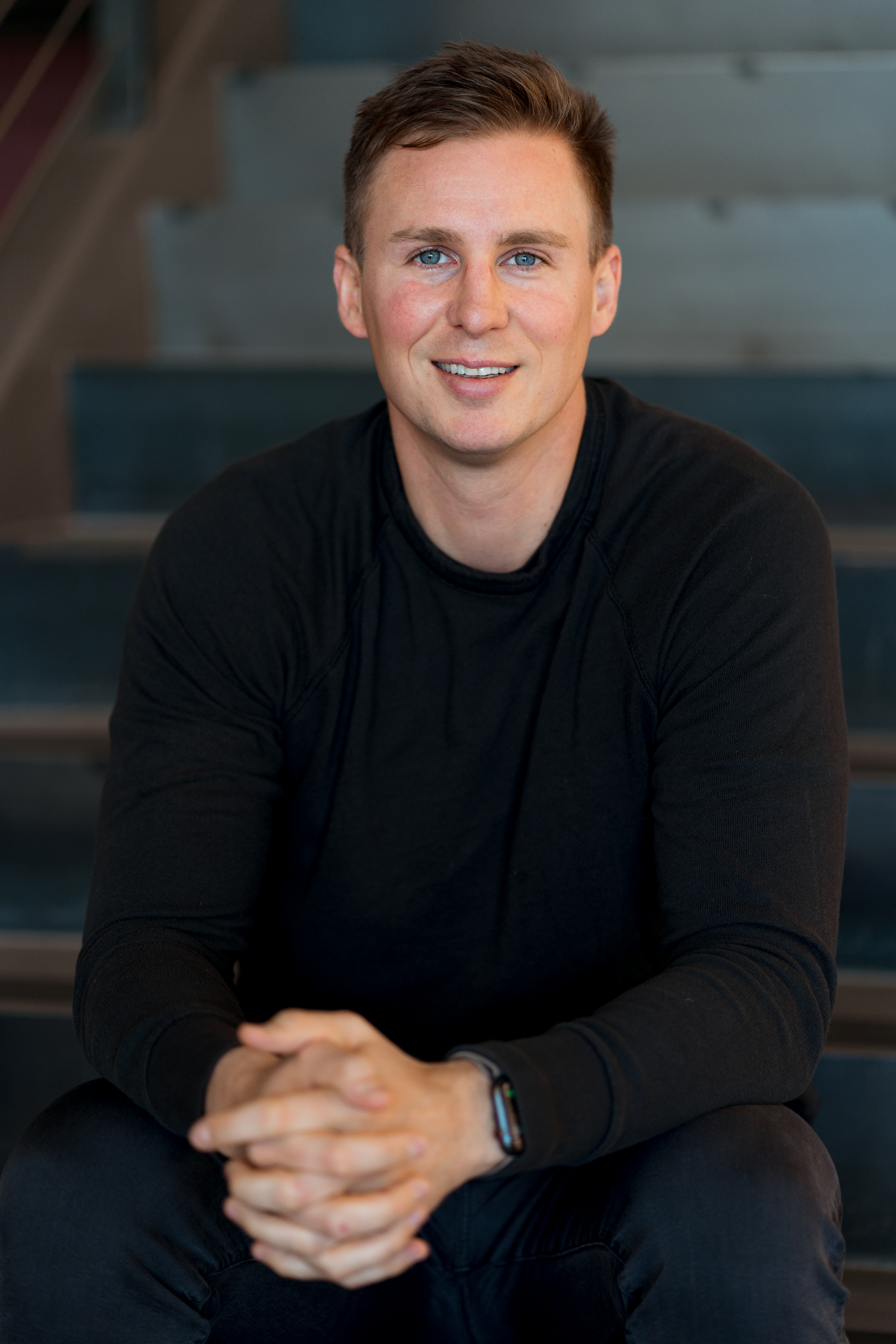
- Adcock in 2022
- Born: April 6, 1986 (age 40); Moweaqua, Illinois, U.S.
- Education: University of Florida (BS)
- Occupation: Technology entrepreneur
- Years active: 2008–present
- Known for: Founder, Figure AI; Founder, Hark; Founder, Cover; Co-founder, Archer Aviation; Co-founder, Vettery
- Title: Chief executive officer, Figure AI
- Children: 3
- Website: brettadcock.com

Brett Adcock (born April 6, 1986) is an American technology entrepreneur who is the founder and chief executive officer of Figure AI. In 2018, Adcock co-founded Archer Aviation, five years after he co-founded Vettery. He established Cover in 2023, and Hark in 2025. As of October 2026, Forbes estimates his net worth at US$23 billion.

== Early life and education ==
Born on April 6, 1986, Adcock was raised on his family's third-generation farm outside Moweaqua, Illinois. At the age of sixteen, Adcock began working on web companies, which included an e-commerce site focused on outdoor electronics and a content site called Street of Walls. He subsequently graduated as the valedictorian of Central A&M High School.

Adcock studied at the University of Florida, initially majoring in industrial engineering, and graduated with a Bachelor of Science in business administration in 2008. During his collegiate education, Adcock was a member of the Phi Kappa Tau fraternity.

== Career ==
In 2013, Adcock co-founded Vettery (which later became known as Hired), a talent marketplace that matched job seekers with employers who needed technical expertise. Adcock started the company out of NYU's Varick Street Incubator. In 2018, the Adecco Group bought Vettery for $100 million.

In October 2018, Adcock co-founded eVTOL company Archer Aviation. He provided a research grant at the University of Florida to start the company, which ultimately headquartered in Palo Alto, California. In February 2021, Archer went public on the New York Stock Exchange.

In May 2022 he founded Figure AI, an artificial intelligence startup based in Sunnyvale that is working on a general-purpose humanoid robot. Adcock assembled Figure's team from people working at Boston Dynamics, Tesla, Google DeepMind and Apple. Adcock opined that the creation of humanoid robots will mitigate labor shortages, and in an October 2025 interview with Time, stated that within 10 years, "every home will have a humanoid." Adcock tested the company’s humanoid robots in his home.

In October 2023, Adcock founded AI security company Cover to prevent school shootings in the United States. Cover uses licensed technology from the Jet Propulsion Laboratory of NASA.

In 2025, Adcock founded Hark, a startup working on AI models and next-generation AI hardware devices, designed to serve as a "universal interface between humans and machines." He has been self-funding the company. In May 2026, Hark raised $700 million at a $6 billion valuation.

== Personal life ==
Adcock resides in Palo Alto, California, with his wife and three children. He has a penchant for the Robot series authored by Isaac Asimov, novels that influenced his career. During a Time photoshoot, Adcock played croquet in his Bay Area weekend home.

== Recognition ==
He was included in the Time 2024 list of influential people in AI.
