= Jean-Paul Votron =

Belgian businessman

Jean-Paul Votron (born 1950) is a Belgian businessman, previously Chief Executive Officer (CEO) and member of the Board of Fortis, a leading European financial group. He was replaced by Herman Verwilst as of 14 July 2008 but who was subsequently replaced shortly thereafter by Filip Dierckx.

== Education ==
He graduated in Commercial and Financial Sciences at the Institut Catholique des Hautes Etudes Commerciales (ICHEC) in Brussels in 1973. In addition he obtained a special degree in Business Strategies and International Management.

== Career ==
In 1975 he started his career at Unilever, where he had management responsibilities in international sales, marketing and general management. He joined Citibank in 1991, where he worked in different positions in Europe and the United States. At Citibank he was President of Citibank Belgium and Marketing Director for Europe, Director of Marketing and technology USA and Europe Consumer Bank, Director Insurance in the US, Head of USA Investment Business (Chicago), and Chairman and CEO of Citibank FSB, a branch network in the USA. He left Citibank in 1997 and joined ABN-AMRO as Senior Executive Vice-President International Consumer Banking and E-Commerce until 2001 when he rejoined Citigroup. In 2002, he was appointed as a member of the Management Committee of Citigroup and until 2004 Jean-Paul Votron was its CEO Retail Bank for Western Europe, Central Europe, Russia, Middle East and Africa.

On 11 October 2004, he joined Fortis as its CEO, succeeding Anton van Rossum and was responsible for the day-to-day management of the group and proposing strategic proposals to the Board. With the onset of the world financial crisis and the exposure of banks to the US sub-prime issue Fortis became one of the first European banks to suffer and in July 2008 Jean-Paul Votron stepped down as CEO.

== Sources ==
- Leaders of Europe's BW50
- Fortis Executive Management
- Interview met Jean-Paul Votron (in Dutch)
