= ICHEC Brussels Management School =

Management school in Brussels, Belgium

- Institut catholique des hautes études commerciales
- Type: Autonomous college (state funded)
- Established: 1954
- Affiliation: Roman Catholicism
- Rector: Brigitte Chanoine
- Students: around 3000
- Location: Brussels, Belgium; 50°50′17″N 4°24′31″E
- Website: www.ichec.be

ICHEC Brussels Management School, officially Institut catholique des Hautes Études commerciales, is a Brussels-based management school, constituting the economic category of the "Haute École ICHEC - ECAM - ISFSC". It also has several training and research centers. ICHEC offers university-level management training programs in both daytime and evening courses, in both initial and continuing education.

ICHEC Brussels Management School ranked 19th in Belgium and 6891st in the World 2023 overall rankings with enrollment.

== Programmes ==
ICHEC's programs include a three-year first cycle:

- Bachelor of Business Engineering,
- Bachelor of Business Administration,

and a second cycle of one or two years:

- Master's degree in Business Sciences,
- Master's degree in Management Sciences - English Track
- Master's degree in Commercial Engineering
- Master's degree in Business Management
  - ICHEC programme
  - Double degree program ICHEC - UCL (LSM)
  - ICHEC - UCL - ULB triple degree program
- Master's degree in Business Management - International Track
- Master's degree Analyst in alternation ICHEC-ECAM
- Master's degree in Management Sciences - English Track

and a third cycle of one or two years:

- Complementary degree in management
- Teacher training

ICHEC also houses the École Supérieure des Sciences Fiscales (ESSF). For over 60 years, the ESSF has been a reference in the field of taxation in Belgium. The institution offers 2 Executive Masters and 6 certificates:

- Executive Master in Tax Law
- Executive Master in European and International Tax Law
- Certificate in Corporate Taxation
- Certificate in Personal Taxation
- Certificate in European and International Taxation
- Certificate in Indirect Taxation
- Certificate in Property Taxation
- Certificate in Tax Procedure and Recovery

== Continuing education ==
In parallel with its School of Management, ICHEC has developed multiple continuing education programs for adults in management-related fields. Today, the ICHEC Formation Continue is ICHEC's continuing education center and the preferred training partner for companies, organisations and individuals throughout their professional career.

== Figures ==
Today, ICHEC has more than 3,000 students of 60 different nationalities, a network of more than 15,000 graduates, 15% of whom work abroad, brought together within the ICHEC-Alumni association, a faculty of more than 300 professors

== Research ==
The ICHEC Research Lab (IRL) is dedicated to interdisciplinary research in economics and management. Its vision is to create a strong culture of research support throughout the ICHEC institution, facilitating interdisciplinary management research rooted in field practice. 46 researchers are currently working at ICHEC.

== Location ==
Located in Brussels, ICHEC has two locations (Montgomery and Manoir d'Anjou).

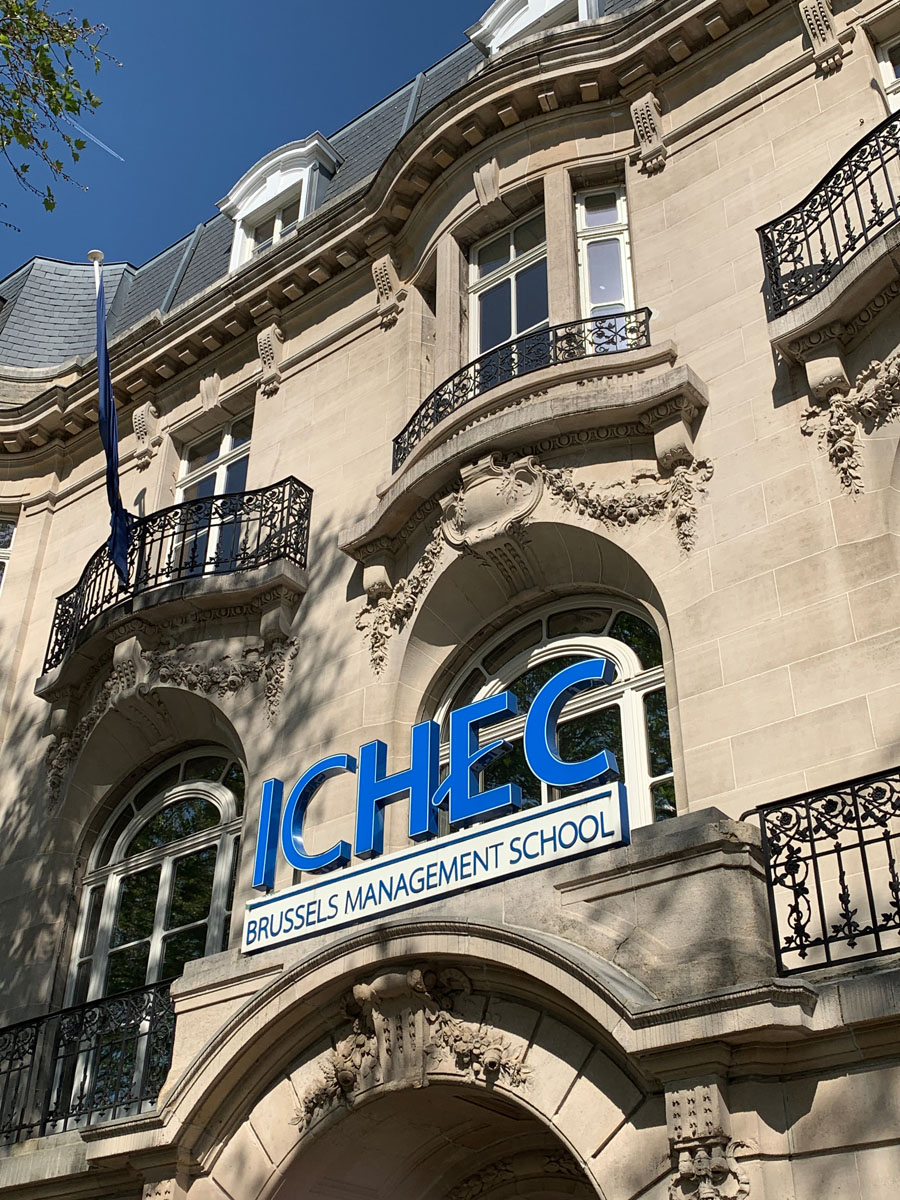
Montgomery campus of ICHEC

== Accreditations ==
ICHEC is the first French-speaking Belgian business school to have obtained the American quality label AACSB (Association to Advance Collegiate Schools of Business).

== Partnerships ==
ICHEC is distinguished by its international dimension, which has become one of its main strategic axes. For more than 20 years, ICHEC has developed multiple and solid collaborations with more than 120 international partners throughout the world. These involve student mobility, faculty exchanges, the development of joint programs and research.

The double degree in finance co-delivered by the Louvain School of Management is recognised by the CFA (Chartered Finance Analyst). The CFA is a globally recognised standard and the achievement of this certification confers international professional recognition in the field of finance.

ICHEC is also the first French-speaking Belgian member of the CLADEA network, an important network of business schools based in Latin America.

== Notable alumni ==
- Etienne Schneider, Luxembourgish politician
- Alain Dehaze, CEO of Adecco Group
- Anne Zagré, Belgian athlete, sprint and long jump specialist
- Camille Laus, Belgian athlete, 400 metres specialist
- Cédric Charlier, Belgian international hockey player
- John Lelangue, Belgian sports director of cycling teams (Phonak, BMC).
- Jean-Pierre Bemba, Congolese politician.
- Jeannine Mabunda, President of the National Assembly of the Democratic Republic of Congo.
