= World Kinect Corporation =

International American-based energy services corporation

- Type: Public
- Traded as: NYSE: WKC; S&P 600 Component
- Industry: Energy
- Founded: 1984
- Headquarters: Doral, Florida, U.S.
- Key people: Michael J. Kasbar, Chairman & CEO
- Products: Energy commodities, derivatives
- Services: Logistics, trading, transportation, financing
- Revenue: ▲US$39.75 billion (2018)
- Operating income: ▲US$259.7 million (2018)
- Net income: ▲US$127.7 million (2018)
- Total assets: ▲US$5.688 billion (2018)
- Total equity: ▲US$1.832 billion (2018)
- Number of employees: ~5,000 (February 2018)
- Subsidiaries: Multiservice Corp, Carter Energy, U.S. Energy Services, Kinect Energy, Alta Fuels and Transportation, Avinode, Texor Petroleum, Western Petroleum, MH Aviation, Colt Aviation, AvCard, Tramp Oil, Nordic Camp, FBO One, Total FBO, myFBO, Norse Bunker, PetroAir, Ascent Aviation, MH Aviation, PAPCO, APP, Avinode, Indianhead Oil, South Minnesota Lubes, AMSTAR, KTM, Beach Front Energy, Bergin Energy, Utilities Exchange, OnDemand Energy Solutions
- Website: worldfuel.com

World Kinect Corporation (WKC, World Kinect), formerly known as World Fuel Services Corporation, is an energy, commodities, and services company based in Doral, Florida. The company ranked No. 70 in the 2022 Fortune 500 list of the largest United States corporations. WKC focuses on the marketing, trading, and financing of aviation, marine, building, and ground transportation energy commodities and related services. As of 2013, WKC also operates in natural gas and power.

The global leader in marine refueling, in 2018 WKC sold a record total of 21 billion gallons of fuel for $39.8 billion in revenue.

== History ==
World Kinect operates an asset light business model, which competitors have attempted to mimic.

In 1984, Paul Stebbins and Michael Kasbar founded Trans-Tec Services, Inc., a marine fuel brokerage company. It was headquartered in New York City. Over the next 10 years they grew the company and built a global network of offices. In 1995, Stebbins and Kasbar sold Trans-Tec to International Recovery Corporation, and the company was renamed World Fuel Services.

International Recovery Corporation was founded in Miami in 1984 and went public on the New York Stock Exchange (NYSE:INT) in 1986. The company changed its name to World Fuel Services Corporation after acquiring Trans-Tec. Stebbins and Kasbar served as members of the board of directors and managed the marine business, prior to taking on the corporate positions they hold today. Oscar Spradley was Chairman of the Board.

WFS was named as a co-defendant in various lawsuits since it had title to crude oil aboard a Montreal, Maine and Atlantic Railway train which derailed in Lac-Mégantic, Quebec on July 6, 2013, resulting in 47 deaths. Prior to the accident, WFS had been lauded as the only firm which had grown faster than technology giant Apple across a ten-year span.

In June 2023, the Company announced a rebrand, changing its name from World Fuel Services Corporation to World Kinect Corporation. On June 16, 2023, after shareholders voted to approve the name change at the Company’s 2023 annual meeting, the Company began trading under the ticker symbol WKC.

== Strategic acquisitions & divestitures ==
Since 2010, World Kinect has made a series of transformational acquisitions in software, financial technology, natural gas, power, and energy management:

- Multi-Service Technology Solutions (acquired 2012): A B2B fuel card and payment company that managed the AIR & SEA Card for the Department of Defense.
- U.S. Energy Services (acquired 2013): Allowed World Kinect to expand into natural gas, power, and energy management. Traditionally a supplier of petroleum products, the firm used U.S. Energy Services as a foundation to expand with a series of six acquisitions. This would pave the way for the new Kinect Energy Group division. Kinect Energy provides "energy management advisory and fulfillment services in over 30 countries and energy reporting in over 150 countries in almost every language and currency."
- Avinode (acquired 2014): An on-demand market place for aircraft charter, similar to vehicle for hire mobile apps.
- Other acquisitions between 2010 and 2014: Carter Energy, Western Petroleum, Lakeside Oil, Petro Air Corp, Watson Fuels, Ascent Aviation, Hiller Group, South Minnesota Lubes, Indianhead Oil, Nordic Camp Supply, Shell Oil Gibraltar, MH Aviation Services Pty, Yacht Fuel Services, and Colt International.
- Universal Weather and Aviation’s UVair jet fuel division in 2020.
- Flyers Energy Group was purchased in 2022 from the Dwelle Family. The purchase price was approximately $775 million. This is the largest purchase in World Fuel Services history.

In 2014, WKC divested interests in a North Dakota Bakken crude oil transloading and trading venture. During the initial Bakken boom there were no pipelines going to the region, forcing product to be shipped by railcar. The venture, with 1,100 railcars, shipped 20 Mb/d as it was one of only six options for producers to move crude oil out of the area. In 2018, two years after launching a freight factoring unit under Multi Service, WKC quickly divested it to BAMFi. In 2020, World Kinect sold its Multi-Service subsidiary to Corsair Capital for $375 million.

== Organization ==
Globally, World Kinect is composed of 185+ subsidiaries, primarily in the U.S., U.K., Singapore, Netherlands, Sweden, and Costa Rica.

It has 150 offices with service in 190 countries.

=== Land segment ===
World Kinect's land-based customers include petroleum wholesalers and distributors, wind turbine operators, and industrial, commercial, residential and government customers. Through subsidiaries, it supplies over 5,000 retail gas stations across the US, UK, and Brazil. Kinect Energy, a global energy management division, offers commercial and industrials for power, natural gas, and water. Transaction management services include fuel card payment under the Multiservice subsidiary.

=== Marine segment ===
The marine segment offers bunkering for global maritime fleets, as well as lubricants and related products and services across 1,200 major seaports. Marine customers include international container and tanker fleets, commercial cruise lines, yachts, time-charter operators, off-shore oil and gas operations, car carriers, military fleets, U.S. and foreign governments, and other fuel suppliers.

=== Aviation segment ===
The aviation segment provides fuel and derivatives to commercial airlines, cargo carriers, airports, fixed-base operators, corporate aircraft fleets, corporate helicopter fleets, government and military aircraft, fractional operators and private general aviation aircraft. Aviation‑related services range from derivatives, aircraft ground handling, and international flight planning services. Major customers include U.S. and foreign governments, intergovernmental and military customers, including the U.S. Defense Logistics Agency and the North Atlantic Treaty Organization (NATO). Other services include card payment, FBO management software, aircraft & crew flight scheduling software (SchedAero), Avinode Group, and de-icing logistics.
