= Cattle drives in the United States =

Movement of cattle by herding over land

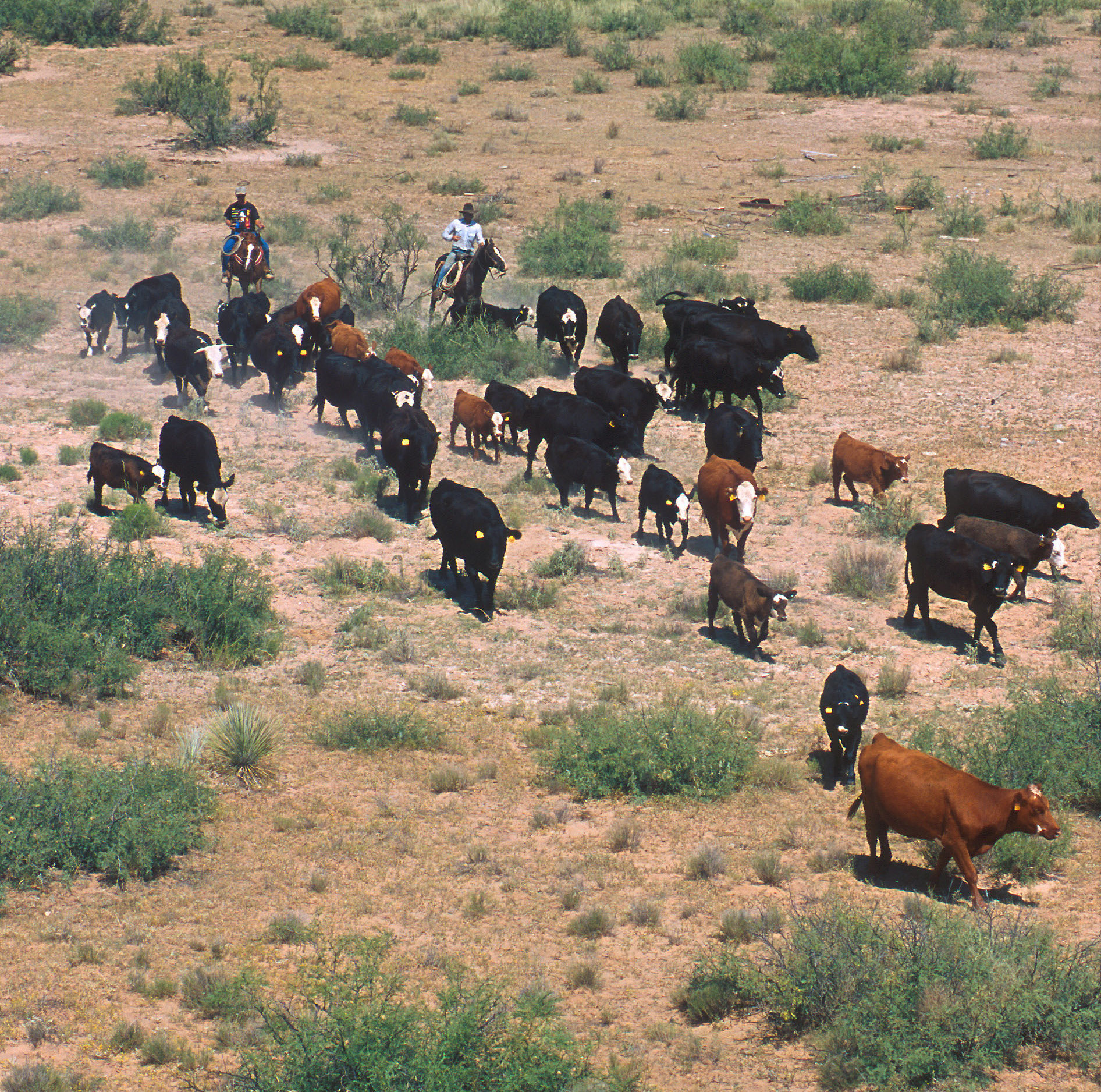
A modern small-scale cattle drive in New Mexico.

Cattle drives were a major economic activity in the 19th and early 20th century American West, particularly between 1850s and 1910s. In this period, 27 million cattle were driven from Texas to railheads in Kansas, for shipment to stockyards in St. Louis and points east, and direct to Chicago. The long distances covered, the need for periodic rests by riders and animals, and the establishment of railheads led to the development of "cow towns" across the frontier.

According to the Kraisingers, "...four Texas-based cattle trails - the Shawnee Trail System, the Goodnight Trail System, the Eastern/Chisholm Trail System, and The Western Trail System - were used to drive cattle north during the forty-year period between 1846 and 1886."

Due to the extensive treatment of cattle drives in fiction and film, the horse has become the worldwide iconic image of the American West, where cattle drives still occur.

== Movement of cattle ==
Cattle drives represented a compromise between the desire to get cattle to market as quickly as possible and the need to maintain the animals at a marketable weight. While cattle could be driven as far as 25 miles (40 km) in a single day, they would lose so much weight that they would be hard to sell when they reached the end of the trail. Usually they were taken shorter distances each day, allowed periods to rest and graze both at midday and at night. On average, a herd could maintain a healthy weight moving about 15 miles (24 km) per day. Such a pace meant that it would take as long as two months to travel from a home ranch to a railhead. The Chisholm Trail, for example, was 1,000 miles (1,600 km) long.

On average, a single herd of cattle on a long drive (for example, Texas to Kansas railheads) numbered about 3,000 head. To herd the cattle, a crew of at least 10 cowboys was needed, with three horses per cowboy. Cowboys worked in shifts to watch the cattle 24 hours a day, herding them in the proper direction in the daytime and watching them at night to prevent stampedes and deter theft. The crew also included a cook, who drove a chuck wagon, usually pulled by oxen, and a horse wrangler to take charge of the remuda (spare horses). The wrangler on a cattle drive was often a very young cowboy or one of lower social status, but the cook was a particularly well-respected member of the crew, as not only was he in charge of the food, he also was in charge of medical supplies and had a working knowledge of practical medicine.

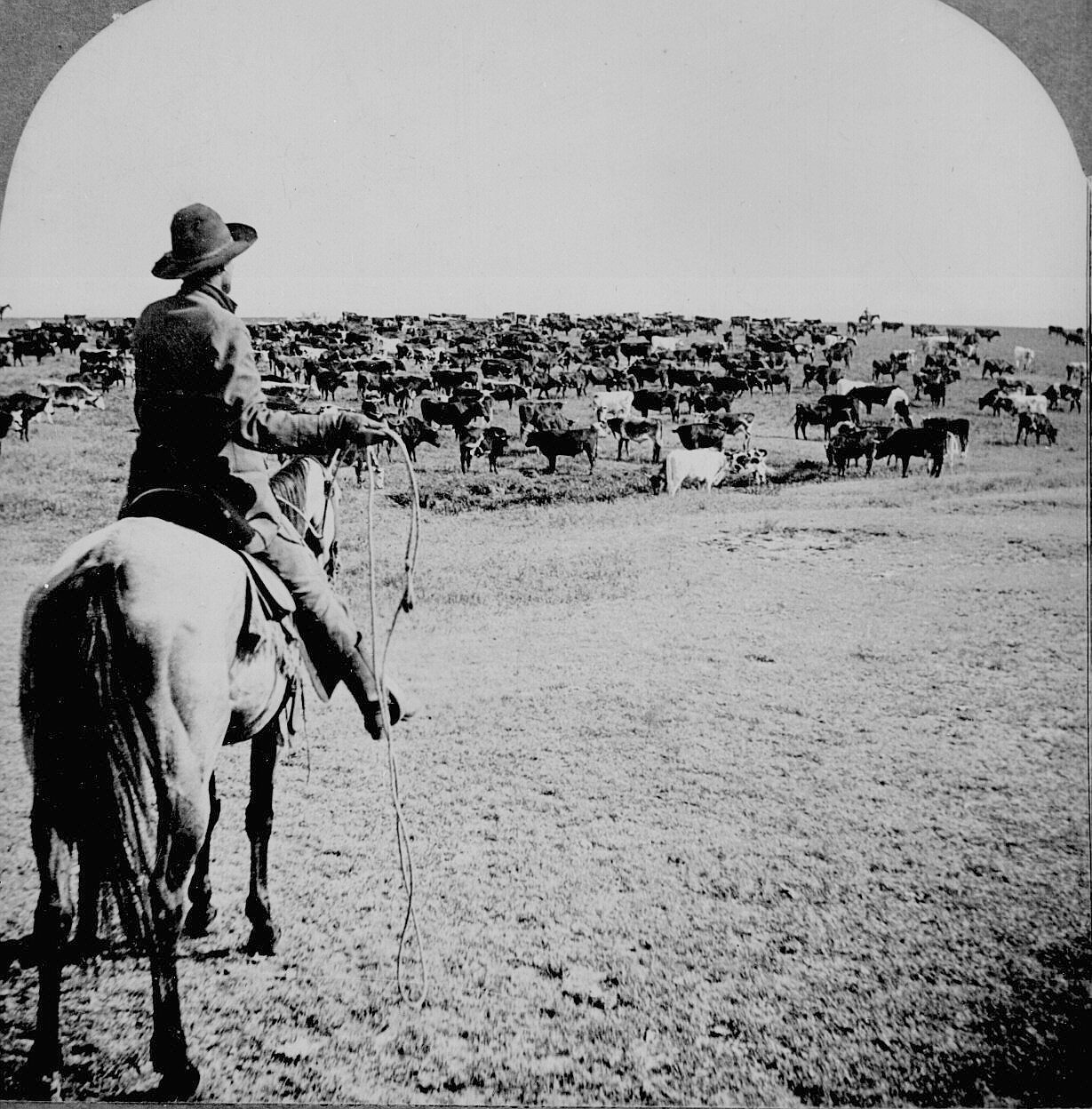
Cattle herd and cowboy, circa 1902

Long-distance cattle driving was traditional in Mexico, California, and Texas, and horse herds were sometimes similarly driven. The Spaniards had established the ranching industry in the New World and had begun driving herds northward from Mexico beginning in the 1540s. Small Spanish settlements in Texas derived much of their revenue from horses and cattle driven into Louisiana, though such trade was usually illegal. Most cattle driving routes in the United States were shorter. For example, early 19th-century Pennsylvania cattle drovers travelled to Philadelphia on the Conestoga Road and Lancaster Pike, which ended near the present site of 30th Street Station. Relatively long-distance herding of hogs was also common. In 1815 Timothy Flint "encountered a drove of more than 1,000 cattle and swine" being driven from the interior of Ohio to Philadelphia.

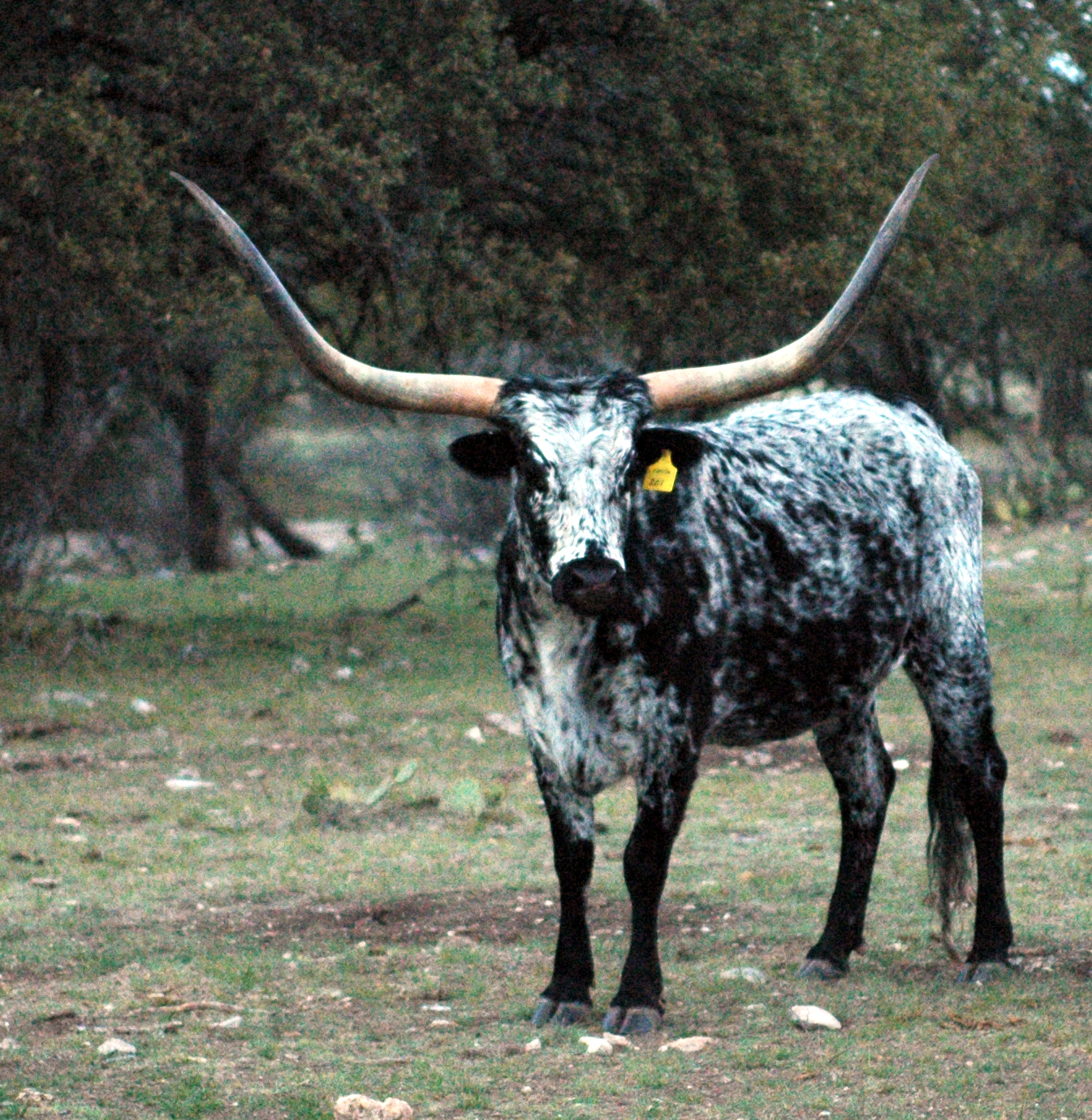
The Texas longhorn was originally driven overland to the railheads in Kansas; they were replaced with shorter-horned breeds after 1900.

As early as 1836, ranchers in Texas began to drive cattle along a "Beef Trail" to New Orleans. In the 1840s, cattle drives expanded northward into Missouri. The towns of Sedalia, Baxter Springs, Springfield, and St. Louis became principal markets. The Shawnee Trail, also known as the Texas Road or Texas trail, played a significant role in Texas as early as the 1840s. But by 1853, as 3,000 cattle were trailed through western Missouri, local farmers blocked their passage and forced herds to turn back because the Longhorns carried ticks that carried Texas fever. Texas cattle were immune to this disease; but the ticks that they left behind infected the local cattle. By 1855 farmers in western and central Missouri formed vigilance committees, stopped some of the herds, killed any Texas cattle that entered their counties, and a law, effective in December of that year, was passed, banning diseased cattle from being brought into or through the state. Therefore, drovers took their herds up through the eastern edge of Kansas; but there, too, they met opposition from farmers, who induced their territorial legislature to pass a protective law in 1859.

During the 1850s, emigration and freighting from the Missouri River westward also caused a rise in demand for oxen. In 1858, the firm of Russell, Majors and Waddell utilized about 40,000 oxen. Longhorns were trained by the thousands for work oxen. Herds of longhorns also were driven to Chicago, and at least one herd was driven all the way to New York. The gold boom in California in the 1850s also created a demand for beef and provided people with the cash to pay for it. Thus, though most cattle were obtained from Mexico, very long drives were attempted. Even the Australians began cattle drives to ports for shipment of beef to San Francisco and, after freezing methods were developed, all the way to Britain. In 1853 the Italian aristocrat Leonetto Cipriani undertook a drive from St. Louis to San Francisco along the California Trail; he returned to Europe in 1855 with large profits.

In 1853-1854, together with his business partner, Washington Malone, Tom Candy Ponting drove the first herd of Texas Longhorn cattle from Texas to New York City, the longest cattle drive in American history.

In the early years of the American Civil War, Texans drove cattle into the Confederate states for the use of the Confederate Army. In October, 1862 a Union naval patrol on the southern Mississippi River captured 1,500 head of Longhorns which had been destined for Confederate military posts in Louisiana. The permanent loss of the main cattle supply after the Union gained control of the Mississippi River in 1863 was a serious blow to the Confederate Army.

The war blocked access to eastern markets. During the Civil War, the Shawnee Trail was virtually unused. Texas cattle numbers grew significantly in that period, and after the war could not be sold for more than $2 a head in Texas. By 1866 an estimated 200,000 to 260,000 surplus cattle were available.

In 1865 at the end of the Civil War, Philip Danforth Armour opened a meat packing plant in Chicago known as Armour and Company, and with the expansion of the meat packing industry, the demand for beef increased significantly. By 1866, cattle could be sold to northern markets for as much as $40 per head, making it potentially profitable for cattle, particularly from Texas, to be herded long distances to market.

== Cattle drive era ==
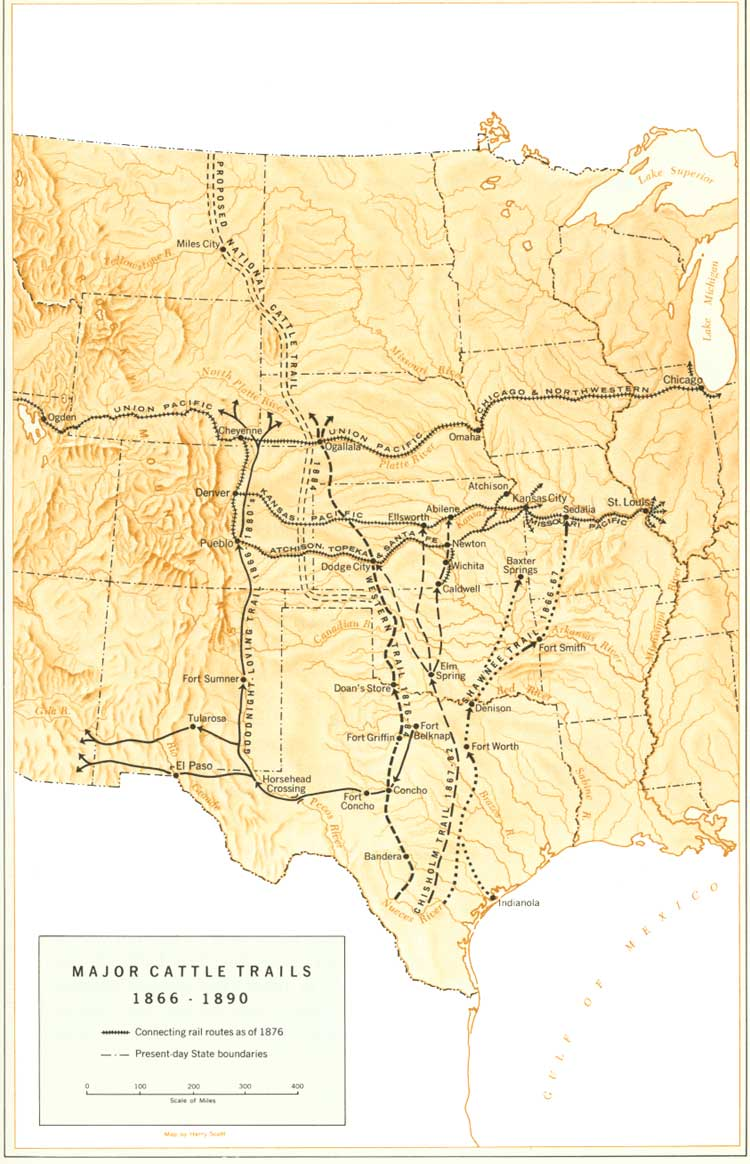
Map of major cattle trails between 1866-1890

The first large-scale effort to drive cattle from Texas to the nearest railhead for shipment to Chicago occurred in 1866, when many Texas ranchers banded together to drive their cattle to the closest point that railroad tracks reached, which at that time was Sedalia, Missouri. Farmers in eastern Kansas, still concerned that transient animals would trample crops and transmit cattle fever to local cattle, formed groups that threatened to beat or shoot cattlemen found on their lands, so the 1866 drive failed to reach the railroad and the cattle herds were sold for low prices. There were other drives northward without a definite destination and without much financial success. Cattle were also driven to the old but limited New Orleans market, following mostly well-established trails to the wharves of Shreveport and Jefferson, Texas. In 1868, David Morrill Poor, a former Confederate officer from San Antonio, drove 1,100 cattle from east of San Angelo into Mexico over the Chihuahua Trail. This event, the "Great Chihuahua Cattle Drive," was the largest cattle drive attempted over that trail up to that time, but the market was much better in Kansas than in Mexico, so most drives headed north.

By 1867, a cattle shipping facility owned by Joseph G. McCoy opened in Abilene, Kansas. Built west of farm country and close to the railhead at Abilene, the town became a center of cattle shipping, loading over 36,000 head of cattle in its first year. The route from Texas to Abilene became known as the Chisholm Trail, named for Jesse Chisholm who marked out the route. It ran through present-day Oklahoma, which then was Indian Territory, but there were relatively few conflicts with Native Americans, who usually allowed cattle herds to pass through for a toll of ten cents a head. Later, other trails forked off to different railheads, including those at Dodge City and Wichita, Kansas. By 1877, the largest of the cattle-shipping boom towns, Dodge City, Kansas, shipped out 500,000 head of cattle.

Other major cattle trails moving successively westward were established. In 1867, the Goodnight-Loving Trail opened up New Mexico and Colorado for Texas cattle. By the tens of thousands, cattle were soon driven into Arizona. In Texas itself, cattle raising expanded rapidly as American tastes shifted from pork to beef. Caldwell, Dodge City, Ogallala, Cheyenne, and other towns became famous because of trail-driver patronage.

== Chisholm Trail ==
The Chisholm Trail was the most important route for cattle drives leading north from the vicinity of Ft. Worth, Texas, across Indian Territory (Oklahoma) to the railhead at Abilene. It was about 520 miles long and generally followed the line of the ninety-eighth meridian, but never had an exact location, as different drives took somewhat different paths. With six states enacting laws in the first half of 1867 against trailing cattle north, Texas cattlemen realized the need for a new trail that would skirt the farm settlements and thus avoid the trouble over tick fever. In 1867 a young Illinois livestock dealer, Joseph G. McCoy, built market facilities at Abilene, Kansas, at the terminus of Chisholm Trail. The new route to the west of the Shawnee soon began carrying the bulk of the Texas herds, leaving the earlier trail to dwindle for a few years and expire.

The typical drive comprised 1,500–2,500 head of cattle. The typical outfit consisted of a boss, (perhaps the owner), from ten to fifteen hands, each of whom had a string of five to ten horses; a horse wrangler who handled the horses; and a cook, who drove the chuck wagon. The wagon carried the bedrolls; tents were considered excess luxury. The men drove and grazed the cattle most of the day, herding them by relays at night. Ten or twelve miles was considered a good day's drive, as the cattle had to thrive on the route. They ate grass; the men had bread, meat, beans with bacon, and coffee. Wages were about $40 a month, paid when the herd was sold.

The Chisholm Trail decreased in importance after 1871 when, as a result of the westward advance of settlement, Abilene lost its preeminence as a shipping point for Texas cattle. Dodge City, Kansas became the chief shipping point for another trail farther west, crossing the Red River at Red River Station, Texas. The extension of the Atchison, Topeka and Santa Fe Railway to Caldwell, Kansas, in 1880, however, again made the Chisholm Trail a most important route for driving Texas cattle to the North, and it retained this position until the building of additional trunk lines of railway south into Texas caused rail shipments to take the place of the former trail driving of Texas cattle north to market.

== Cattle towns ==
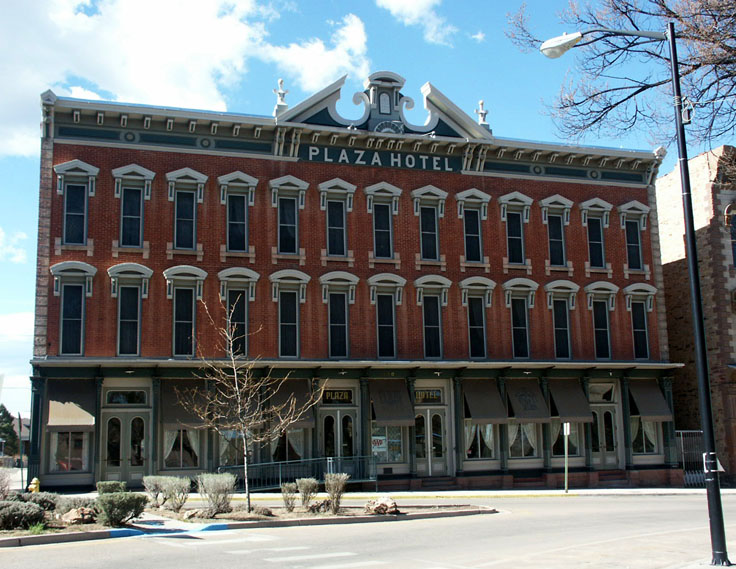
The Plaza Hotel in Las Vegas, New Mexico opened a year after the railroad established it as a key railhead for the cattle drives.

The cattle towns flourished between 1866 and 1890 as railroads reached towns suitable for gathering and shipping cattle. The first was Abilene, Kansas. Other towns in Kansas, including Wichita and Dodge City, succeeded Abilene or shared its patronage by riders fresh off the long trail. In the 1880s Dodge City boasted of being the "cowboy capital of the world." Communities in other states, including Ogallala, Nebraska; Cheyenne, Wyoming; Miles City, Montana; and Medora, North Dakota, served the trade as well. Amarillo, Fort Worth, and Wichita Falls, all in Texas; Prescott, Arizona, Greeley, Colorado, and Las Vegas, New Mexico were regionally important.

The most famous cattle towns like Abilene were railheads, where the herds were shipped to the Chicago stockyards. Many smaller towns along the way supported open range lands. Many of the cow towns were enlivened by buffalo hunters, railroad construction gangs, and freighting outfits during their heyday. Cattle owners made these towns headquarters for buying and selling.

Cowboys, after months of monotonous work, dull food, and abstinence of all kinds, were paid off and turned loose. They howled, got shaved and shorn, bought new clothes and gear. They drank "white mule" straight. Madams and gambling hall operators flourished in towns that were wide open twenty-four hours a day. Violence and ebullient spirits called forth a kind of "peace officer" that cattle towns made famous—the town marshal. James Butler Hickok, Wyatt Earp, and Bat Masterson were among the best-known cattle town marshals. The number of killings was, however, small by the standards of eastern cities.

== End of the open range ==
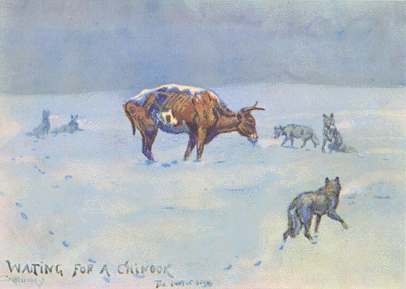
Waiting for a Chinook by C.M. Russell. Overgrazing and harsh winters were factors that brought an end to the age of the open range

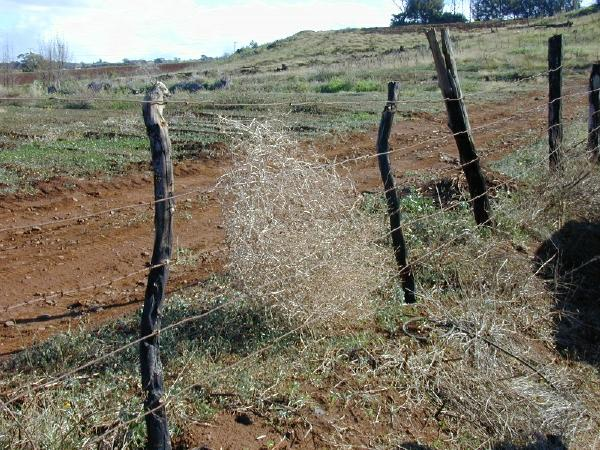
Introduction of barbed wire fences marked the closure of the open range.

Expansion of the cattle industry resulted in the need for additional open range. Thus many ranchers expanded into the northwest, where there were still large tracts of unsettled grassland. Texas cattle were herded north, into the Rocky Mountains and Dakotas. In 1866, Nelson Story used the Bozeman Trail to successfully drive about 1000 head of Longhorn into the Gallatin Valley of Montana. Individual cattle barons such as Conrad Kohrs built up significant ranches in the northern Rockies. In 1866, Kohrs purchased a ranch near Deer Lodge, Montana from former Canadian fur trader Johnny Grant. At its peak, Kohrs owned 50,000 head of cattle, grazing on 10 million acres (4 million hectares) spread across four states and two Canadian Provinces, and shipped 10,000 head annually to the Union Stock Yards in Chicago.

Later, however, continued overgrazing, combined with drought and the exceptionally severe winter of 1886–1887 wiped out much of the open range cattle business in Montana and the upper Great Plains. Following these events, ranchers began to use barbed wire to enclose their ranches and protect their own grazing lands from intrusions by others' animals.

In the 1890s, herds were still occasionally driven from the Panhandle of Texas to Montana. However, railroads had expanded to cover most of the nation, and meat packing plants were built closer to major ranching areas, making long cattle drives to the railheads unnecessary.

== Modern cattle drives ==
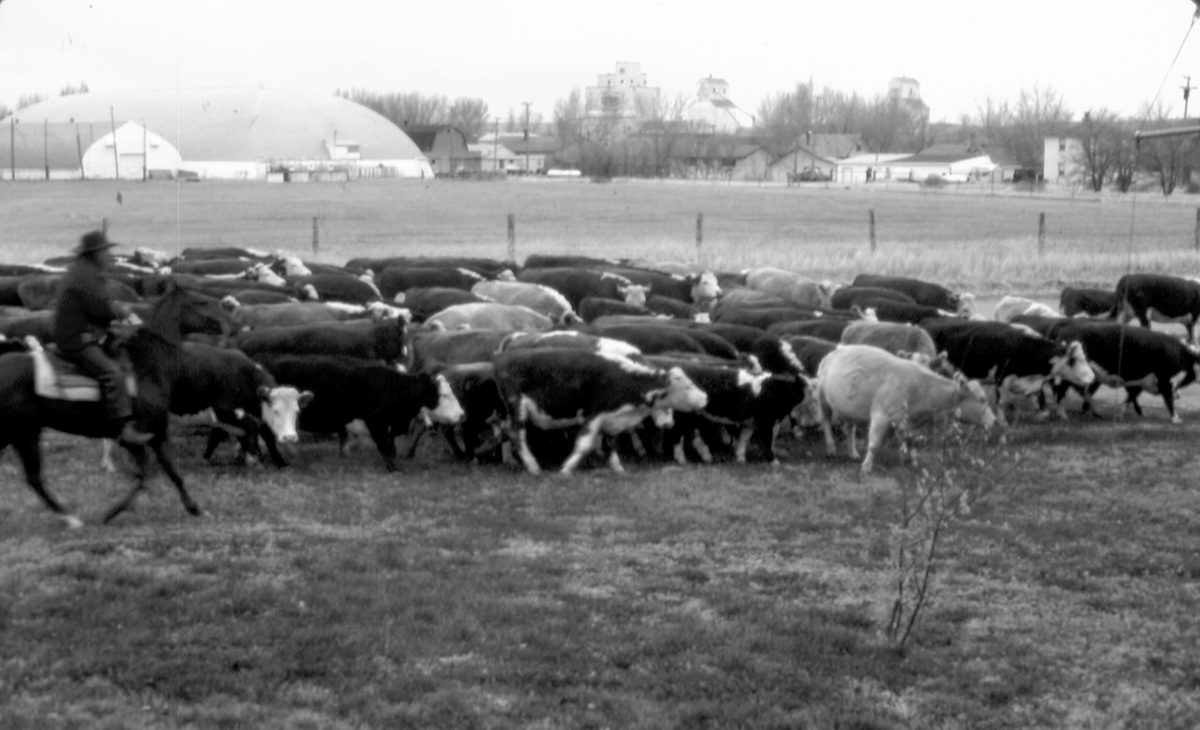
Modern day cattle drive, 1987

Smaller cattle drives continued at least into the 1940s, as ranchers, prior to the development of the modern cattle truck, still needed to herd cattle to local railheads for transport to stockyards and packing plants. Today, cattle drives are primarily used to round up cattle within the boundaries of a ranch and to move them from one pasture to another, a process that generally lasts at most a few days. Because of the significance of the cattle drive in American history, some working ranches have turned their seasonal drives into tourist events, inviting guests in a manner akin to a guest ranch to participate in moving the cattle from one feeding ground to the next. While horses are still used in many places, particularly where there is rough or mountainous terrain, the all-terrain vehicle is also used. When cattle are required to move longer distances, they are shipped via truck.

In 1969, spearheaded by attorney Roslyn Chasan, the Great Western Land & Cattle Co. led the last overland cattle drive from Bluewater, New Mexico to Pagosa Springs, Colorado.

Events intended to promote the western lifestyle may incorporate cattle drives. For example, the Great Montana Centennial Cattle Drive of 1989 celebrated the state of Montana's centennial and raised money for a college scholarship fund as 2,400 people (including some working cowboys), 200 wagons and 2,800 cattle traveled 50 miles in six days from Roundup to Billings along a major highway. Similar drives have been sponsored since that time.

== Cowboy culture ==
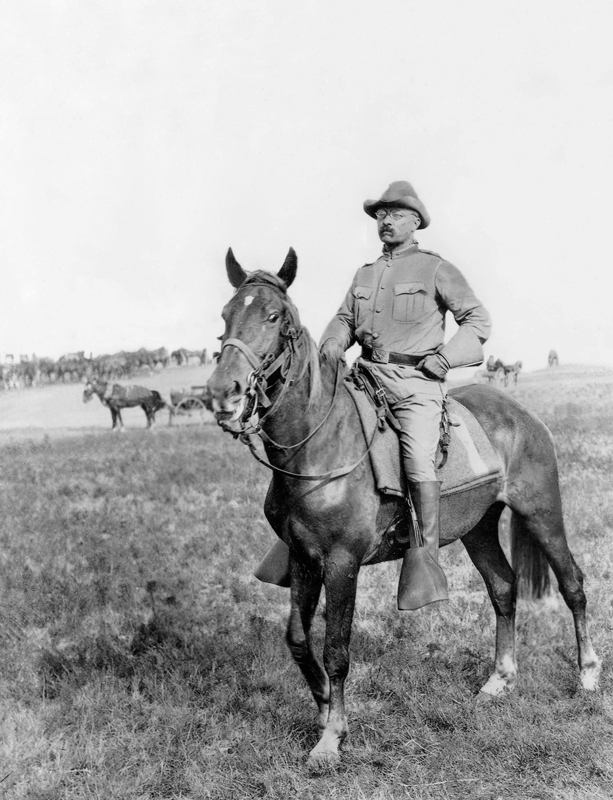
Theodore Roosevelt (shown on horseback,1898) helped popularize the image of the American cowboy through his writings.

The cowboy's distinctive working gear, most of it derived from the Mexican vaquero, captured the public imagination. High-crowned cowboy hat, high-heeled boots, leather chaps, pistol, rifle, lariat, and spurs were functional and necessary in the field, and fascinating on the movie screen. Increasingly the public identified the cowboy with courage and devotion to duty, for he tended cattle wherever he had to go, whether in bogs of quicksand; swift, flooding rivers; or seemingly inaccessible brush. He rode with lightning and blizzard, ate hot summer sand, and was burned by the sun. Theodore Roosevelt conceptualized the herder as a stage of civilization distinct from the sedentary farmer—a classic theme well expressed in the 1944 Broadway hit "Oklahoma!"—Roosevelt argued that the manhood typified by the cowboy—and outdoor activity and sports generally—was essential if American men were to avoid the softness and rot produced by an easy life in the city. The cow towns along the trail were notorious for providing liquor to the cowboys; they usually were not allowed to drink on the trail itself.

== Image and memory ==
Over approximately three decades, cattle drives transported more than 10 million cattle and 1 million range horses across the American West. The industry contributed to Texas's economic development and helped establish the longhorn and cowboy as enduring symbols of the American West.

The best known writers of the era include Theodore Roosevelt, who spent much of his inheritance ranching in the Dakotas in the 1880s, Will Rogers, the leading humorist of the 1920s, and Indiana-born Andy Adams (1859–1935), who spent the 1880s and 1890s in the cattle industry and mining in the Great Plains and Southwest. When an 1898 play's portrayal of Texans outraged Adams, he started writing plays, short stories, and novels drawn from his own experiences. His The Log of a Cowboy (1903) became a classic novel about the cattle business, especially the cattle drive. It described a fictional drive of the Circle Dot herd from Texas to Montana in 1882, and became a leading source on cowboy life; historians retraced his path in the 1960s, confirming his basic accuracy. His writing is acclaimed and criticized for both its fidelity to truth and lack of literary qualities.

== Cattle drives on television and film ==
Cattle drives were a major plot element of many Hollywood films and television shows, particularly during the era when westerns were popular. One of the most famous movies is Red River (1948) directed by Howard Hawks, and starring John Wayne and Montgomery Clift. Like many such films, Red River tended to exaggerate the dangers and disasters of cattle driving. More recently, the movie City Slickers (1990) was about a guest ranch-based cattle drive. In the 1958 film Cowboy, Glenn Ford stars as a hard-living trail boss with Jack Lemmon as a citified "tenderfoot" who joins the drive.

The long running TV show Rawhide (1959–1965), starring Eric Fleming and Clint Eastwood, dealt with drovers taking 3000 head along the Sedalia trail from San Antonio, Texas to the railhead at Sedalia. Episode four of the 1970s miniseries Centennial, titled The Longhorns, featured a cattle drive from central Texas to northeastern Colorado. The 1980s miniseries Lonesome Dove, based on a Pulitzer Prize winning novel of the same name, centered on a cattle drive from South Texas to Montana.

== See also ==
- Cowboy
- Ranch
- Droving
- Railroad land grants in the United States
- Station (Australian agriculture)
  - Drover (Australian)

== Bibliography ==
- Malone, John William. An Album of the American Cowboy. New York: Franklin Watts, Inc., 1971. ISBN 9780531015124
