= Tom Candy Ponting =

American cattleman and pioneer of the cattle drive (1853–1854)

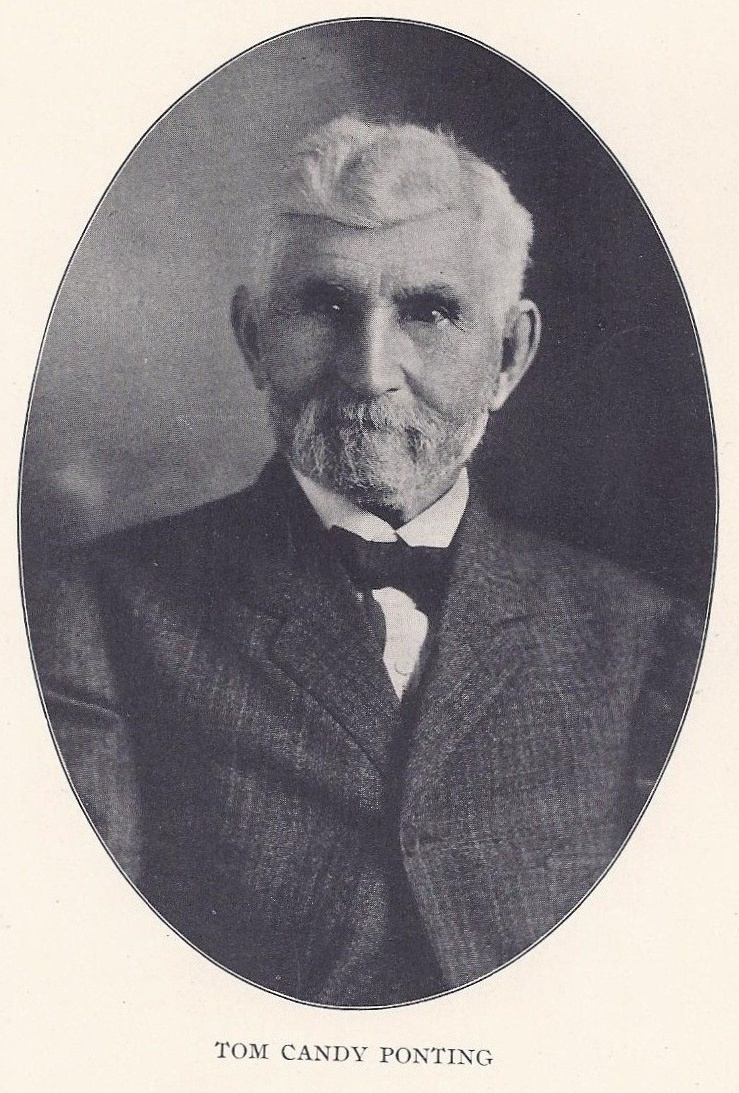
- Born: August 26, 1824; Bath, Somerset, England
- Died: October 11, 1916 (aged 92); Decatur, Illinois, USA
- Resting place: Westside Cemetery in Moweaqua, Illinois
- Occupation(s): Rancher, cattle driver, farmer
- Spouse: Margaret Kautz Snyder Ponting (married 1856-1916, his death)
- Children: 7

Tom Candy Ponting (August 26, 1824 - October 11, 1916) was an American rancher, farmer and cattle driver. In 1853–1854, together with his business partner, Washington Malone, they were the first people to drive a herd of Texas Longhorn cattle from Texas to New York City, the longest cattle drive in American history.

== Early years ==
Tom Candy Ponting was born at Hayden Farm, Perish of Kilsmeredo, near Bath, England on August 26, 1824. He was the fourth of nine children of John and Ruth Shearn Ponting. He was christened “Tom” not Thomas. Candy was his paternal grandmother's family name. His family were cattle breeders, a profession that he followed all of his life. He and his brother John sailed to United States on a clipper ship in 1847. The trip took six weeks. Arriving in New York City, they traveled by train and boat through Albany, Buffalo and Cleveland. They traveled by wagon through Ohio where Tom's brother John settled in Knox County. Tom continued his travels west, financing his way by buying and selling cattle in Wisconsin and Illinois.

In 1851 Ponting formed a partnership with Indiana native Washington Malone. They bought cattle in Illinois and took them north to Wisconsin to sell to butchers. In the fall of 1852 the beef business in Milwaukee was declining, so Tom and Malone decided to go by horseback to Texas to check out longhorns.

== 1853-1854 cattle drive ==
In Texas they purchased about 600 head of longhorns and in April 1853 they drove the cattle north through Indian territory in Oklahoma where they met up with Jesse Chisholm, continuing east along the Shawnee Trail to Missouri. At St. Louis they crossed the Mississippi River by ferry. The cattle were wintered in Christian County, near Moweaqua, Illinois where they were corn fed.

In the spring of 1854 they got the cattle into the pasture early to fatten them up. They sold off half of the herd and picked one hundred fifty fat cattle and headed east with them to Indiana. The cattle swam across the Wabash River without any problems. At Muncie, Indiana they put the cattle on railroad cars bound for New York. They unloaded the cattle at Cleveland and Dunkirk, New York to give them a rest, finally arriving at Bergin Hill, New Jersey where they ferried them across the Hudson River and into New York City where they drove them through the streets of Manhattan arriving at the Hundred Street Market on July 3, 1854.

These were the first Texas cattle that were ever in New York. They sold them off in bunches of ten to twenty in a bunch. The New-York Daily Times reported “A novel feature, this week, is a lot of cattle from Texas, fed in Illinois”.

== Later years and death ==
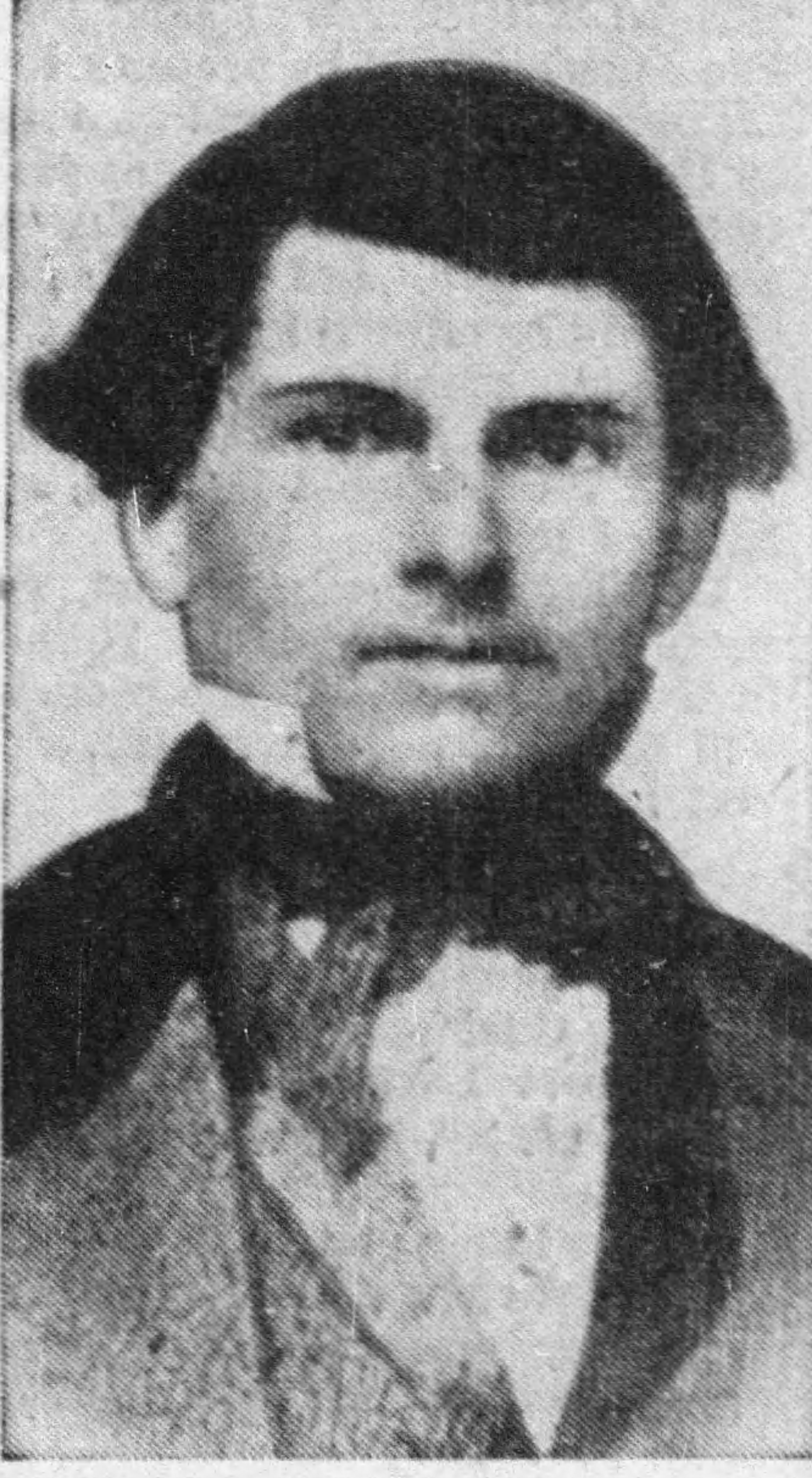
Tom Candy Ponting 1856

Ponting returned to Illinois where he lived for over 60 years. He purchased land near Moweaqua, where he raised Hereford cattle on his farm that he named Homestead Farm. He became a prairie cattle king, counting among his friends Abraham Lincoln, Potter Palmer, Aaron Montgomery Ward, Horace Greeley, Buffalo Bill Cody and P. T. Barnum. He is credited with developing the prairie cattle industry and making Chicago the world's leading cattle market. He died in Decatur, Illinois, October 11, 1916, and is buried in Moweaqua.

== Family ==
Ponting married Margaret Snyder in Moweaqua, Illinois in 1856. They had seven children, three of whom died in infancy and one died in a railroad accident at age 12. Tom always praised his wife for much of their success, he said “I suppose that I would not have a cent in the world if it had not been for that good woman”. They made a great team and they always worked together. Margaret Ponting died October 21, 1922, Moweaqua at age 82.

== In popular culture and literature ==
The 2023 book, Longhorns East, by Johnny D. Boggs, is a fictionalized version of Ponting's life.
