= Archer Aviation =

American electric aircraft manufacturer

Archer Aviation Inc.
- Type: Public
- Traded as: NYSE: ACHR
- ISIN: US03945R1023
- Industry: Aviation
- Founded: 16 October 2018; 8 years ago
- Founders: Adam Goldstein; Brett Adcock
- Headquarters: San Jose, California, U.S.
- Area served: Worldwide
- Key people: Adam Goldstein (CEO), Tom Muniz (COO), Geoff Bower (CFO)
- Products: Electric aircraft, Electric Air Taxi, Electric Vertical Takeoff And Landing Aircraft
- Revenue: $1.6 million (Q1 2026)
- Net income: ▲ -$317.3 million (2023)
- Total assets: ▼$578.3 million (2023)
- Total equity: ▼$493.3 million (2023)
- Number of employees: 900 (2025)
- Divisions: Archer Air; Archer Brazil
- Subsidiaries: Insitu 2026‍–‍present SkyGrid 2026‍–‍present Wisk Aero 2026‍–‍present
- Website: archer.com

Archer Aviation Inc. is a publicly traded aerospace and defense technology company headquartered in San Jose, California, which is developing eVTOL aircraft for urban air taxi and defense operations.

Its eVTOL aircraft is designed to allow airline operators to transport people in and around cities in an air taxi service and are claimed to have a range of up to 100 miles (160 km) at speeds of up to 150 miles per hour (240 km/h). United Airlines is its first major corporate partner, having conditionally ordered two hundred Archer electric aircraft.

== History ==
Archer was founded on October 16, 2018, by Adam Goldstein and Brett Adcock to develop electric vertical takeoff and landing aircraft. The company was originally started by Goldstein and Adcock and privately funded. Later, Marc Lore, a Walmart executive, also supported its launch.

In 2022, Adcock departed from both the leadership team and the board. Goldstein is currently the sole CEO and Chairman of the Board of Directors of the company.

Initially, Archer worked on developing aircraft with the Herbert Wertheim College of Engineering at the University of Florida; Goldstein and Adcock are both alumni. Archer now operates a research lab on the University of Florida's campus in Gainesville, Florida, which was funded by Goldstein and Adcock.

In August 2022, United Airlines paid Archer a $10 million deposit for 100 electric flying taxis. On November 10, 2022, Archer and United Airlines announced plans for the first electric air taxi route in the US, with an initial route between Newark Liberty International Airport and the Downtown Manhattan Heliport. Archer became an IPO (ACHR)on September 20, 2021.

On November 17, 2022, Archer unveiled details of its production vehicle dubbed "Midnight". The aircraft is a piloted, four-passenger air taxi the company said will enter flight testing by the second quarter of 2023 and service by 2025. However, as of late 2026, Midnight has not begun FAA's TIA testing or demonstrated the Midnight's ability to fly in EVTOL with humans on board.

Archer announced its Maker prototype had achieved full remote transition from vertical to horizontal flight on November 29, 2022. This milestone was said to be an important validation step for the flight control systems and aircraft architecture that is also applicable to its Midnight production aircraft.

In January 2023, Archer announced a partnership in which Stellantis, a multinational automobile manufacturer, would provide up to $150 million in equity capital to support Archer's growth and to collaborate on the development and production of Archer's eVTOL aircraft for urban air mobility. The purpose of the partnership solidifies Stellantis as Archer's exclusive contract manufacturer for mass production of its eVTOL aircraft.

In March 2023, Archer and United Airlines announced plans for an electric air taxi route between O'Hare International Airport and Vertiport Chicago on the city's near west side.

On June 5, 2024 Archer received its Part 135 Air Carrier and Operator Certificate from the Federal Aviation Administration (FAA).

In July 2024, Archer and Southwest Airlines established an agreement to develop operational concepts for air taxi networks.

In December 2024, Archer had completed the construction of ARC, a new 400,000 square-foot eVTOL manufacturing facility in Covington, Georgia.

On Feb, 2025 Archer Aviation received its Part 141 certification from the Federal Aviation Administration (FAA), enabling the company to establish its pilot training academy.

In June 2025, at the Paris Air Show, Archer Aviation and Dubai-based Jetex signed an agreement to collaborate on developing eVTOL facilities, starting in the United Arab Emirates at the Jetex Abu Dhabi private terminal. The partnership, signed by Archer CEO Adam Goldstein and Jetex Founder & CEO Adel Mardini, will see Jetex provide access to its network of private terminals to support the launch of Archer’s Midnight air taxi services in the region.

In July 2025, Archer Aviation’s Midnight eVTOL aircraft conducted its first test flight outside the United States at Al Bateen Executive Airport in Abu Dhabi. The flight tested performance under UAE-specific conditions—such as high heat, humidity, and dust—and marked a major milestone in advancing Archer’s planned urban air mobility operations in the region. It was supported by the Smart and Autonomous Systems Council (SASC) and observed by senior officials from the UAE General Civil Aviation Authority and related aviation authorities.

In November 2025, Archer acquired Hawthorne Municipal Airport in Los Angeles for US$126 million for use by its EVTOL craft.

In August 2026, Archer Aviation announced a proposed acquisition of Boeing subsidiaries Wisk Aero, Insitu, and SkyGrid in exchange for 19.75% of Archer's shares.

== Aircraft ==
=== Maker ===
Maker, Archer's full size demonstrator aircraft, was unveiled on June 10, 2021, at an event in Los Angeles, California. Maker was a fully electric vertical takeoff and landing aircraft with 12 electric propellers: six tilt-props (each with five blades) for forward and VTOL flight and six aft propellers that are stationary (each propeller with two blades) for VTOL-only flight. The aircraft is powered by six independent battery packs. In November 2021, Archer moved Maker from its headquarters to its flight test facility to start initial test flights. Maker also received its airworthiness certificate to start flight test operations from the FAA in December 2021. Archer completed its first remote flight demo within December 2021.

=== Midnight ===
Midnight is Archer’s planned production aircraft. The aircraft was unveiled on November 17, 2022 at an event in Palo Alto, California. Archer’s Midnight is a piloted, four-passenger aircraft designed to perform rapid back-to-back flights with minimal charge time between flights. Midnight has 12 propellers: six tilt props in the front of the wing for forward and VTOL flight and six aft propellers that are stationary for VTOL flight only. Midnight is designed to travel at up to 150 mph (240 km/h) with a maximum range of 100 miles (161 km). The aircraft is powered by six independent battery packs. On June 12, 2024, Midnight completed its first remote transition flight without a human on board. Archer flew over 400 test flights in 2024.

As of mid-2026, Midnight is undergoing piloted EVTOL tests and has not yet flown with a human on board in EVTOL configuration. The Midnight aircraft’s first remote test flight outside the United States took place in July 2025 at Al Bateen Executive Airport in Abu Dhabi, where it was evaluated under local environmental conditions as part of preparations for regional certification.

In February 2026, Archer Aviation announced plans to attempt a piloted transition, as well as integrate Starlink satellite connectivity into its Midnight electric air taxi aircraft. The system is intended to provide reliable communication between the aircraft and ground operations while supporting future urban air mobility services.

==== Thunder ====
Thunder is a planned autonomous, unmanned 'attack rotorcraft', aiming to complement (and potentially replace) the work of attack helicopters, at a time when the latter are proving to be vulnerable in drone-heavy environments, designed to be a "loyal wingman" flying aside helicopters like the Apache and future Cheyenne fleet. The pair of optimum-speed tiltrotors also means that the Thunder can fly similar distances as the Bell MV-75 Cheyenne II, a tiltrotor in development by the Army with a combat range of up to 800 n.m.

Thunder was co-developed with Anduril Industries.

=== Halo ===
Halo is a planned commercial variant of the Thunder. It uses the same airframe and systems, without weaponry. The plane fits inside a standard shipping container for transport. Halo is targeted at offshore energy supply, heavy freight logistics, maritime operations, and emergency medical cargo transport.

Its top speed 278 kn (515 km/h; 320 mph), with a range of 800 nmi (1,500 km; 920 mi). Its operating ceiling is 18,000 ft (5,500 m). It is powered by a hybrid-electric propulsion system. A generator powers electric motors that drive dual tiltrotors, which provide lift.

Its design is modular. Archer designed the airframe, battery architecture, powertrain, and rotor dynamics, based on commercial supply chains. Anduril integrated the (artificial intelligence) flight software, defense systems, and command-and-control system via its Lattice platform.

== Air taxi ==
Archer's aerial ridesharing service, also referred to as Urban Air Mobility (UAM), has been pushed back multiple years and is not yet operational. The launch of the taxi service relies on the launch of the Midnight Aircraft, which has not yet begun FAA Certification Archer is working with Urban Movement Labs to help build the necessary infrastructure and service routes. It is also working with the City of Miami on similar plans.

== Safety Incidents ==
In July 2024, a forklift accident at Acher's San Jose facilities involving falling metal crates pinned and killed a contracting electrical worker. Cal OSHA found Archer was at fault for "serious" safety violations and imposed safety citation and also a fee.

In October 2026 at the same San Jose facility, Archer experienced a thermal runway incident related to electric Molicel batteries. The incident injured three employees, caused a fire, and required the evacuation of around 100 personnel. It remains under investigation and was formally classified as a hazardous spill by California State.

== See also ==
- eVTOL
- Urban Air Mobility
- EHang
- Horizon Aircraft
- Joby Aviation
- Lilium
- Vertical Aerospace
- Volocopter GmbH
