= Adam Goldstein (technology executive) =

American entrepreneur

- Born: Adam Goldstein
- Education: University of Florida (BS); New York University Stern School of Business (MBA)
- Occupations: Entrepreneur; executive
- Years active: 2005–present
- Employer: Archer Aviation
- Title: Chief executive officer and chairman
- Board member of: Museum of American Finance

Adam Goldstein is an American entrepreneur and executive in the aviation and technology sectors. He is the co-founder of Archer Aviation, a company developing electric vertical takeoff and landing aircraft, where he has been chief executive officer and chairman since 2018.

== Early life and education ==
Goldstein completed a Bachelor of Science degree at the University of Florida and later received a Master of Business Administration from the New York University Stern School of Business.

== Career ==
Goldstein co-founded Vettery, Inc. in 2012 and was chief executive officer until 2019. The company operated in recruitment and hiring technology and was acquired by the Adecco Group in February 2018 for a reported $100M. Vettery raised less than $10 million in funding prior to its acquisition.

In 2018, Goldstein co-founded Archer Aviation, Inc., which develops electric vertical takeoff and landing (eVTOL) aircraft, where he is chief executive officer and chairman. Archer was publicly listed on the New York Stock Exchange in 2021.

Goldstein was previously employed as a senior analyst at Cedar Hill Capital Partners from 2005 to 2009, a portfolio manager at Plural Investments from 2009 to 2019, and associated with Minetta Lane Capital Partners as a co-managing partner between 2011 and 2012. He has held executive roles at Mission Archery, Inc. from 2018 to 2020 and been on the Board of Trustees of the Museum of American Finance since 2013.
