= Alain Dehaze =

Belgian business executive

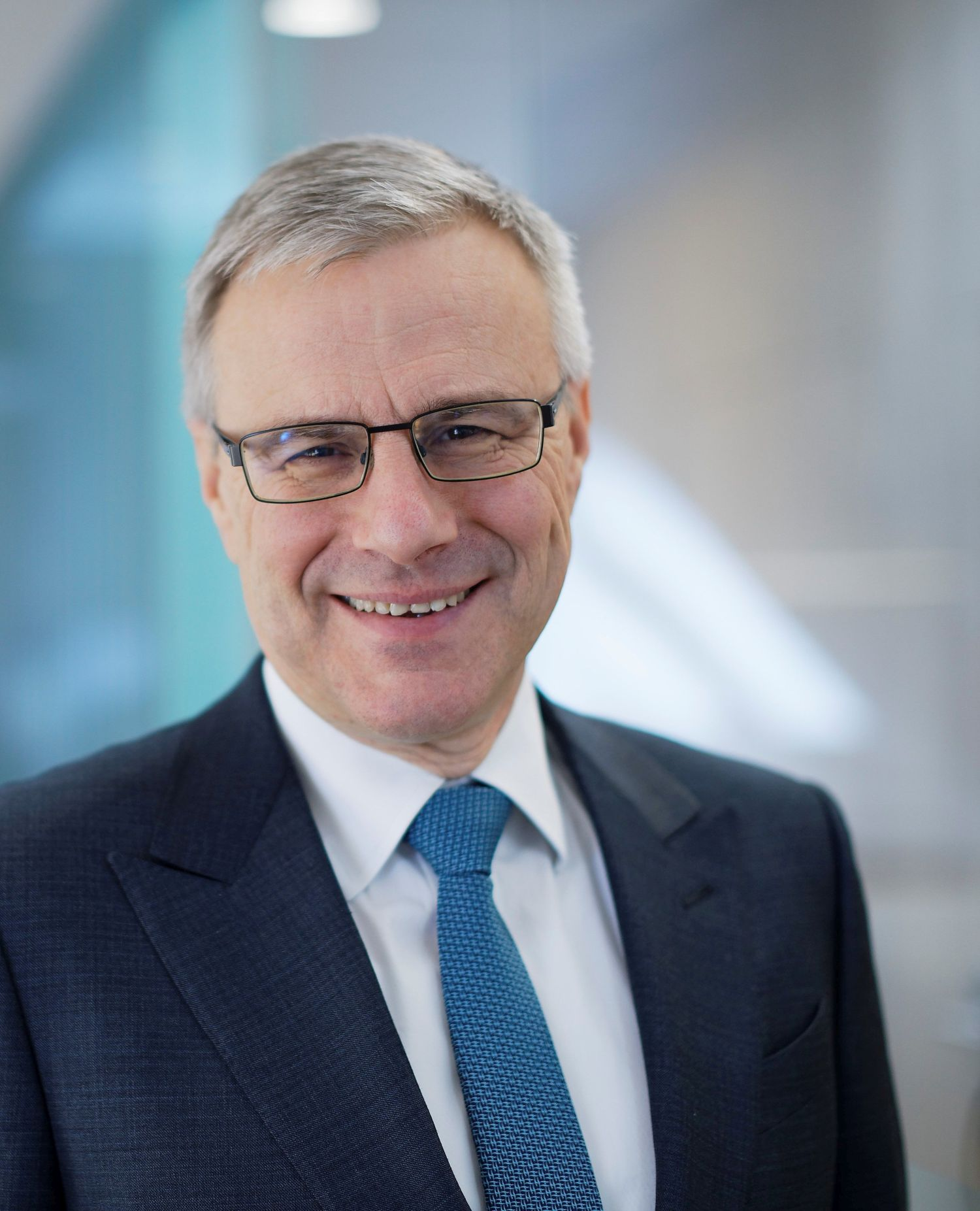
- Born: Belgium
- Education: ICHEC Brussels Management School
- Occupations: Chairman and CEO, Adecco Group
- Years active: 2000-present

Alain Dehaze (born 1963) is a Belgian business executive who was the former CEO of The Adecco Group. Having previously worked as the Adecco Regional Chief for Northern Europe and France, he joined The Adecco Group in September 2015.

He began his executive career with Henkel and ISS A/S, moving through positions continent-wide. In 2000 he became the Belgium's chief for USG People and in 2002 he was made the CEO of Solvus, a Human Resources consultancy. In 2005 he became the COO of USG People, and before joining Adecco in 2009, he worked as the CEO of the medical technology company Humares.

He graduated from the ICHEC Brussels Management School.

Since 2017 he has been a member of the Global Commission on the Future of Work of the ILO (International Labor Organization).

Alain Dehaze is an advocate of a new social contract that would help bridge the skills gap and take advantage of automation and robotization. To that end, employees would be incentivized to learn new skills throughout their working life as life-long contracts are expected to become less and less common.
