= Hired (company) =

Online hiring marketplace

Vettery
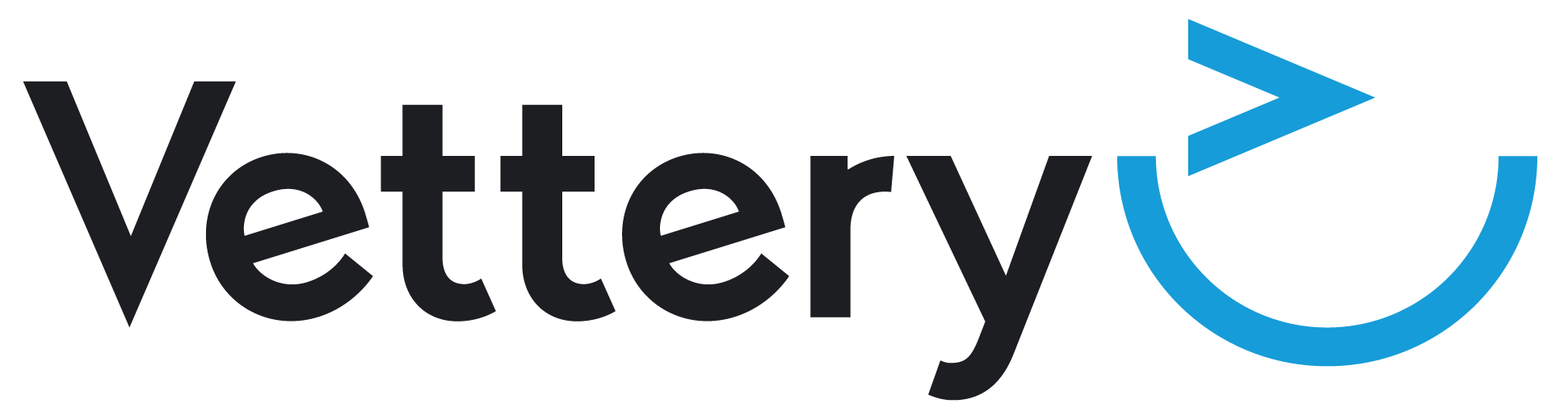
- Formerly: Vettery
- Type: Private
- Industry: Technology
- Founded: 2013
- Founder: Brett Adcock; Adam Goldstein
- Headquarters: New York City, United States
- Parent: The Adecco Group
- Website: vettery.com

Hired (previously known as Vettery) is a hiring marketplace. Vettery was founded by Brett Adcock and Adam Goldstein in 2013.

In November 2020, Vettery acquired the technology recruitment platform Hired.

== History ==
Vettery was originally founded in March 2013 in New York City by Brett Adcock and Adam Goldstein. The service launched in the United States in June 2015. UK operations launched in May 2018.

Vettery matches employers with the candidates in its databases, in various fields such as technology, sales, and finance. Companies currently using Vettery to hire employees include Amazon, eBay and JP Morgan, among others.

In June 2015, Vettery raised $1.7 million in seed funding. In 2016, it raised $9 million in Series A funding led by Raine Ventures and Greycroft Partners. Vettery raised $11.9 million over three rounds.

As of August 2016, the company has raised $11.9 million and is based in New York City.

In February 2018, Vettery was bought by the Switzerland-based staffing firm Adecco Group. TechCrunch reported that terms of Vettery's acquisition at over $100 million.

In November 2020 Vettery, as part of the Adecco Group, purchased competing tech marketplace Hired for an undisclosed amount. In March 2021, Vettery and Hired's products were combined and rebranded as Hired. As of June 14, 2024, Hired is part of LHH Recruitment Solutions; The Adecco Group’s U.S. professional recruitment brands - Accounting Principals, Ajilon, Paladin and Parker & Lynch - are now LHH Recruitment Solutions.
