= Avinode Group =

Swedish technology company

- Industry: Business aviation
- Founded: 2002
- Headquarters: Gothenburg, Sweden
- Key people: Oliver King, CEO

Avinode Group is a Swedish B2B technology company focused on business aviation. It specializes in operating the Avinode Marketplace, an online marketplace for private air charter.

== History ==
Avinode was founded in 2002 by three Chalmers University of Technology graduates - Niklas Berg, Per Marthinsson, and Niclas Wennerholm. At this point in time, operators and brokers relied primarily on phone calls and faxes to source and schedule aircraft. Berg, Marthinsson, and Wennerholm created an online marketplace called the Avinode Marketplace, which quickly gained traction. In 2010, Avinode acquired its US marketplace competitor, CharterX. In 2014, Avinode was acquired by World Kinect Corporation. As of 2018, an average of 7,000 aviation professionals use the system daily, approximately 3,200 aircraft are listed in the marketplace, and nearly 300,000 flight requests are processed monthly. Roughly 80% of professionals in the business aviation industry use Avinode Group products. In May 2024, the acquisition of Avinode by CAMP Systems International, Inc. took place, in turn a subsidiary of the Hearst Corporation.

In April 2026, SVT said that Avinode was being used by Russian elites, including oligarchs, to avoid sanctions imposed following the 2022 Russian invasion of Ukraine. SVT's investigation included posing as a sanctioned Russian citizen, they were then contacted by Russian brokers who confirmed that they were using Avinode. According to lawyer Alexandre Prezanti, the company being aware of services being provided to Russian customers would constitute a violation of EU sanctions. Avinode declined an interview with SVT and responded via email to some of its questions, saying the situation was the result of a single employee.

== Suite of applications ==
Avinode Group consists of three applications serving different groups and purposes with business aviation.

- Avinode connects the services of operators and brokers globally, enabling buyers to search for trips, request quotes, and communicate with sellers.
- SchedAero, the web-based software for fleet operations, was launched in 2012. SchedAero serves operators and private flight departments as an online system for aircraft and crew scheduling, quoting, regulatory compliance, and maintenance.
- Paynode, launched in 2016, is a digital payment platform developed specifically for the air charter industry.
