= Adecco =

Swiss multinational human resource consulting company

The Adecco Group AG

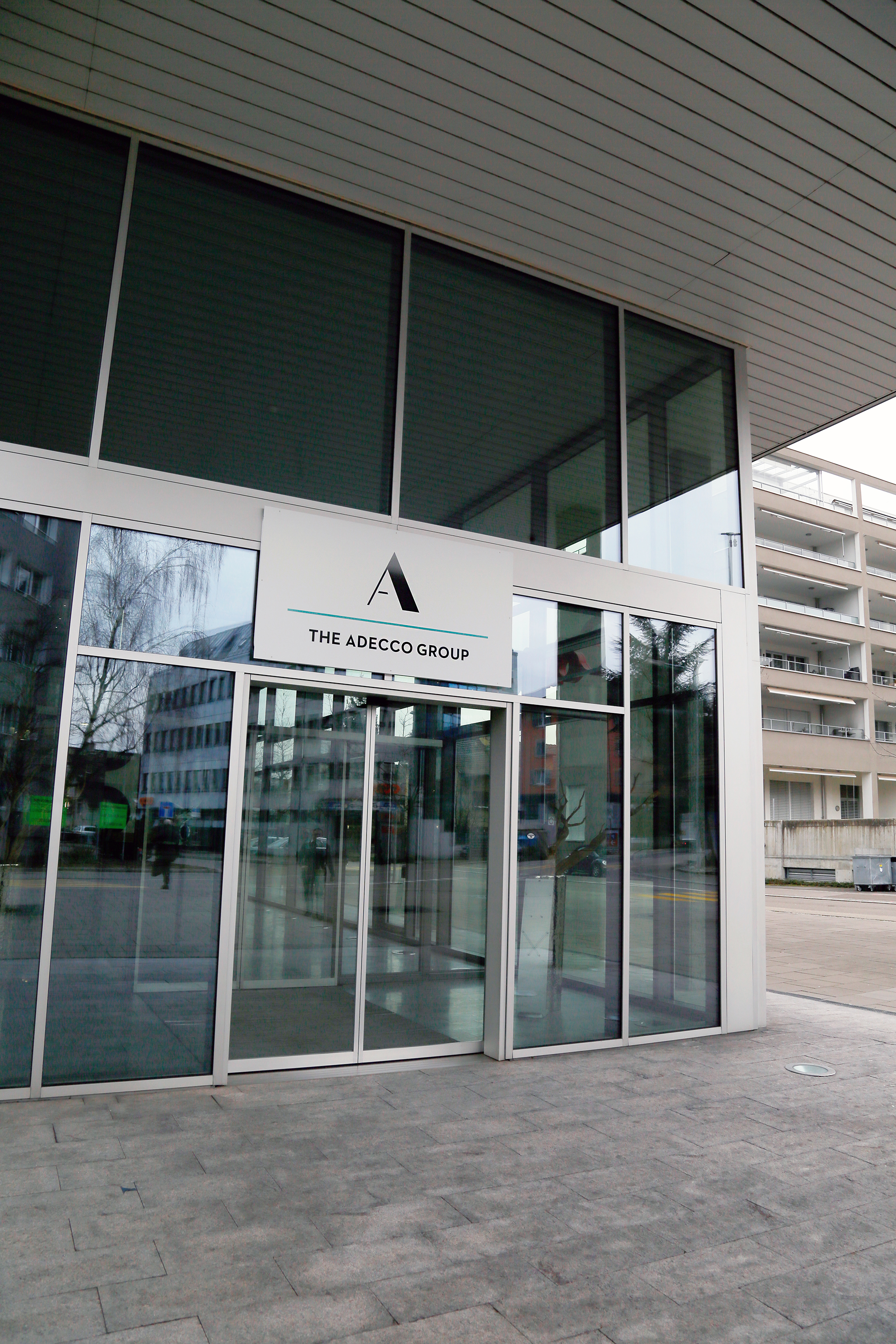
- The Adecco Group headquarters in Zürich, Switzerland
- Type: Aktiengesellschaft
- Traded as: SIX: ADEN; SMI MID component
- Industry: Professional services
- Predecessors: Ecco; Adia Interim
- Founded: 1 January 1997; 29 years ago
- Headquarters: Zürich, Switzerland
- Number of locations: 5,200 branches in over 60 countries and territories
- Area served: Worldwide
- Key people: Jean-Christophe Deslarzes (Chairman); Denis Machuel (CEO)
- Services: Employment agencies, recruitment, human resource consulting and outsourcing
- Revenue: ▼€23.082 billion (2025)
- Operating income: ▲€572 million (2025)
- Net income: ▼€294 million (2025)
- Total assets: ▼€11.756 billion (2025)
- Total equity: ▼€3.396 billion (2025)
- Number of employees: ~34,000 FTE (2025)
- Website: adeccogroup.com

The Adecco Group is a Swiss–French company based in Zürich, Switzerland. It is the world's second largest human resources provider and temporary staffing firm. It is a Fortune Global 500 company and is listed on the SIX Swiss Exchange.

== Overview ==
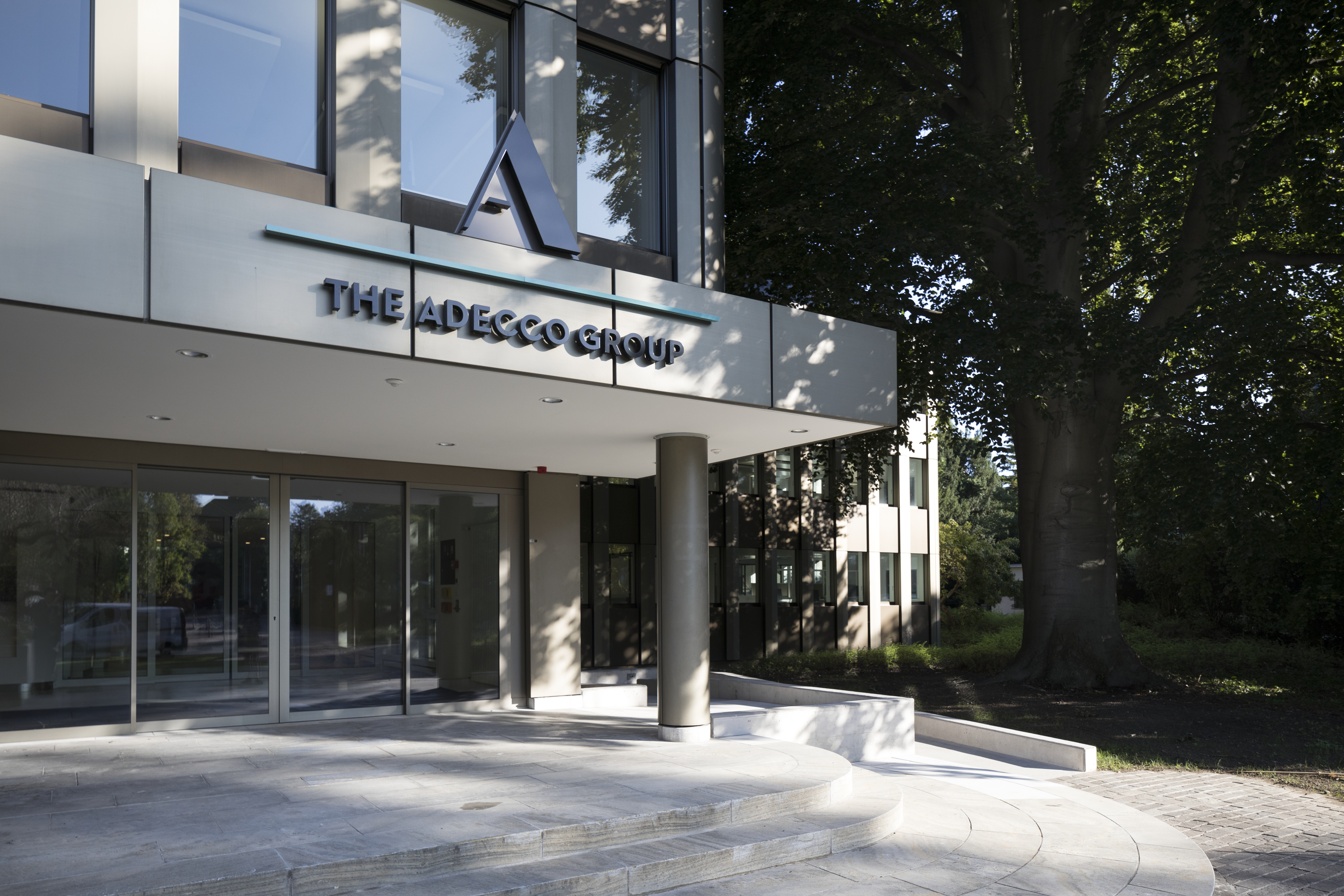
The Adecco Group global headquarters in Zürich is located in Bellerivestrasse since 2017.

Services offered by the group include temporary staffing, permanent job placement, career transition, and talent development in the office, industrial, technical, financial, and legal sectors, as well as business process outsourcing and consulting. As of 2025 the company had 34,000 company-based full-time equivalent employees (excluding consultants). It operates three global business units: Adecco, Akkodis, and LHH. Its operating brands include Adecco, DIS AG, General Assembly, Innovation Foundation, LHH, Akkodis, Adia, and Pontoon.

== History ==
The Adecco Group was formed on 1 January 1997 by the merger of the French company Ecco founded in Lyon as Interecco in 1964, and the Swiss company Adia Interim, founded in Lausanne in 1957 as Adia.

In 2015, Alain Dehaze became the CEO. In 2022, Dehaze was succeeded by Denis Machuel as CEO.

In January 2025, the company announced an expanded partnership with Bullhorn to implement artificial intelligence in its digital operations.

== Mergers and acquisitions ==
In September 1997, the company acquired US temporary staffing company TAD Resources International of Cambridge, Massachusetts, for $387.5 million.

The company acquired Olsten Staffing in late 1999, and became the largest recruitment company in the U.S., with a combined revenue of €11.6 billion.

UK recruitment company Spring Group was acquired in 2009, and a year later in 2010, Jacksonville, Florida-based staffing firm MPS Group was acquired for an estimated 1.3 billion.

At the start of 2011, The Adecco Group began a joint venture in Shanghai with Chinese HR services company FESCO and in September of that year, acquired US-based Drake Beam Morin, Inc.

In January 2012, it was announced that the company had acquired Japanese staffing service VSN Inc.

2014 saw the acquisition of U.S freelance worker-on-demand company OnForce of Lexington, Kentucky.

Canadian recruitment services company Knightsbridge Human Capital Solutions, a company offering career transition, talent and leadership development, was acquired in 2015.

In March 2016, the company acquired UK recruitment services company Penna Consulting PLC.

The Adecco Group acquired Vettery, a recruitment marketplace startup, for $100 million USD in February 2018. Subsequently, Vettery and Hired were merged and operated under the Hired brand. In April of that same year, the U.S.-based education technology provider General Assembly was acquired.

In 2019, the company announced the sale of U.S. healthcare staffing business Soliant Health to Olympus Partners for a cash consideration of $612 million.

In November 2020, Vettery purchased competing tech marketplace Hired for an undisclosed amount and combined the two business's products under the Hired brand.

French engineering and technology consulting firm Akka Technologies was acquired in July 2021 for a reported €2.0 billion.
