= Transport in Dublin =

This article deals with transport in the Greater Dublin Area centred on the city of Dublin in Ireland.

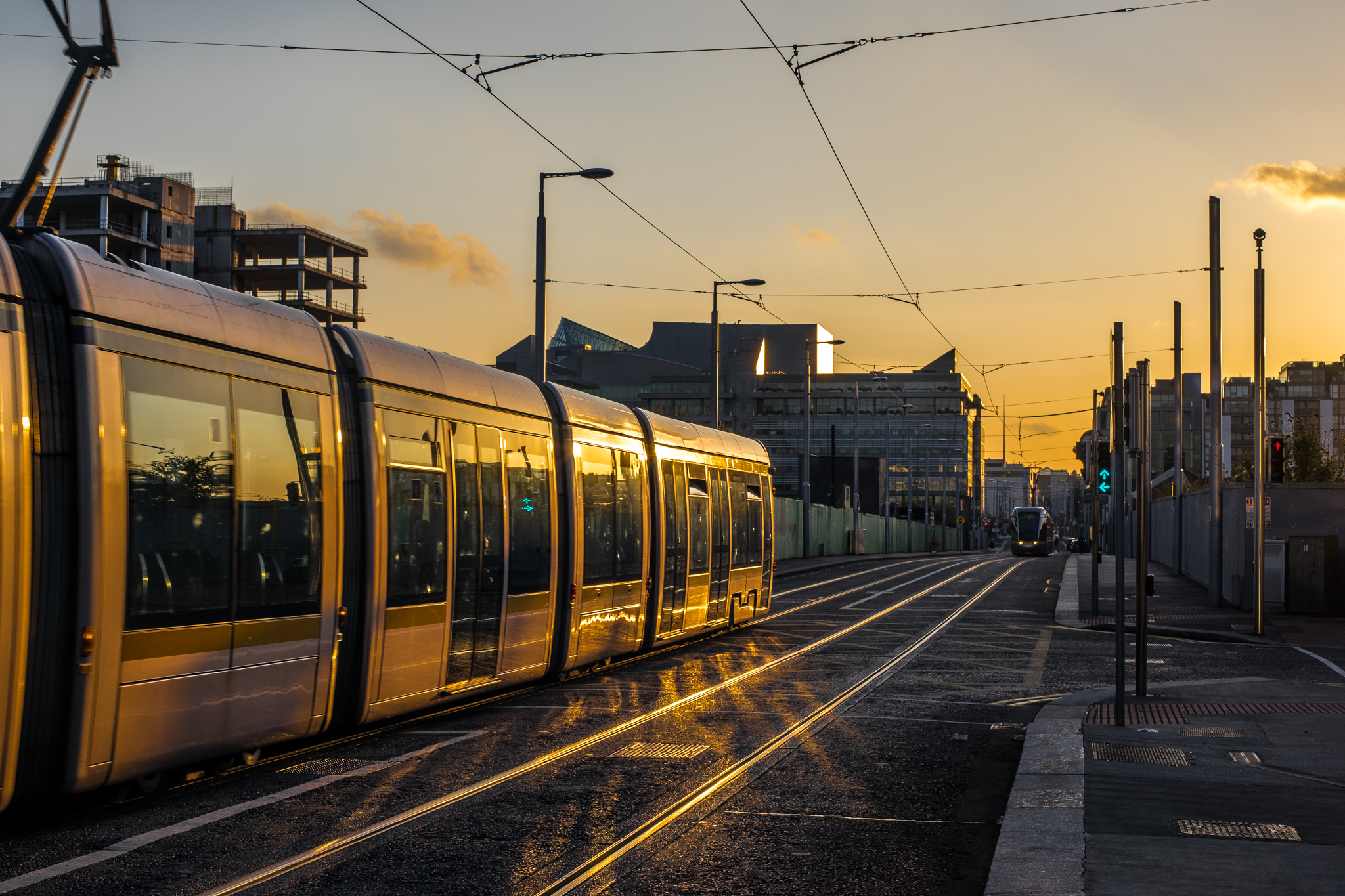
Sunset on the Luas trams

== Public transport ==
There are a number of modes of public transport in the Greater Dublin area run by a number of transport operators, most of them state or semi-state entities. Public transport in Dublin was overseen by the Dublin Transportation Office until 2009 when the National Transport Authority replaced this body. Public transport in Dublin underwent a major expansion in recent years, and the Irish Government had plans to invest heavily in the system under the Transport 21 plan. However, as a result of the changed economic environment since 2008 these plans have been subject to re-assessment.

Dublin's transit system utilises electrified suburban trains, diesel commuter rail, trams and a bus network to provide services to the population of the Greater Dublin Area.

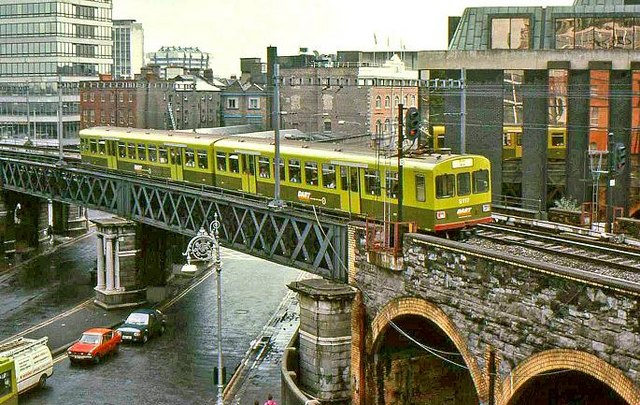
The Loop Line in 1986 with the DART.

The now-defunct Railway Procurement Agency was responsible for establishing an integrated ticketing system for use throughout Dublin City. This system was introduced on 12 December 2011 and is based on use of a pre-paid electronic card called a TFI Leap Card. The National Transport Authority is responsible for improving integration between Dublin's various public transport systems. The number of Leap Card users was reported to have increased by 500,000 users to 2.5 million users in September 2017.

=== Rail ===
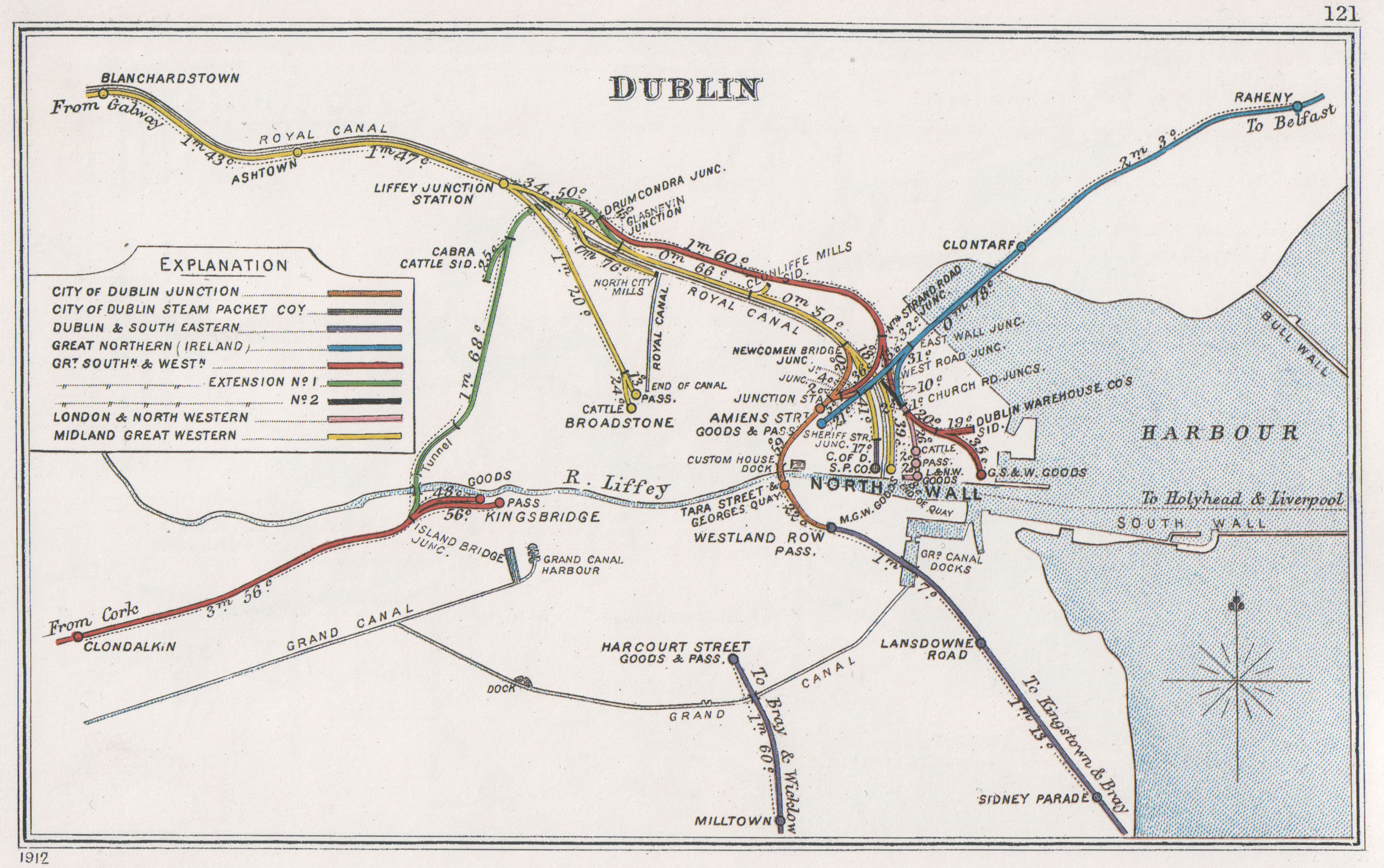
1912 rail network map from the Railway Clearing House

Rail services in Dublin include the six lines of the Dublin Suburban Rail operated by Iarnród Éireann, Ireland's national railway system. One of these is the electrified DART. Passenger traffic to other Irish cities is also operated by Iarnród Éireann from Connolly and Heuston stations. Heuston Station connects with the South and West (Ballina, Westport, Galway, Ennis, Limerick, Tralee, Cork and Waterford lines) and Connolly Station serves Sligo, Wexford and Belfast.

==== Commuter rail ====
Commuter rail in Dublin operates on five lines. All commuter rail is operated by Iarnród Éireann's diesel multiple units.

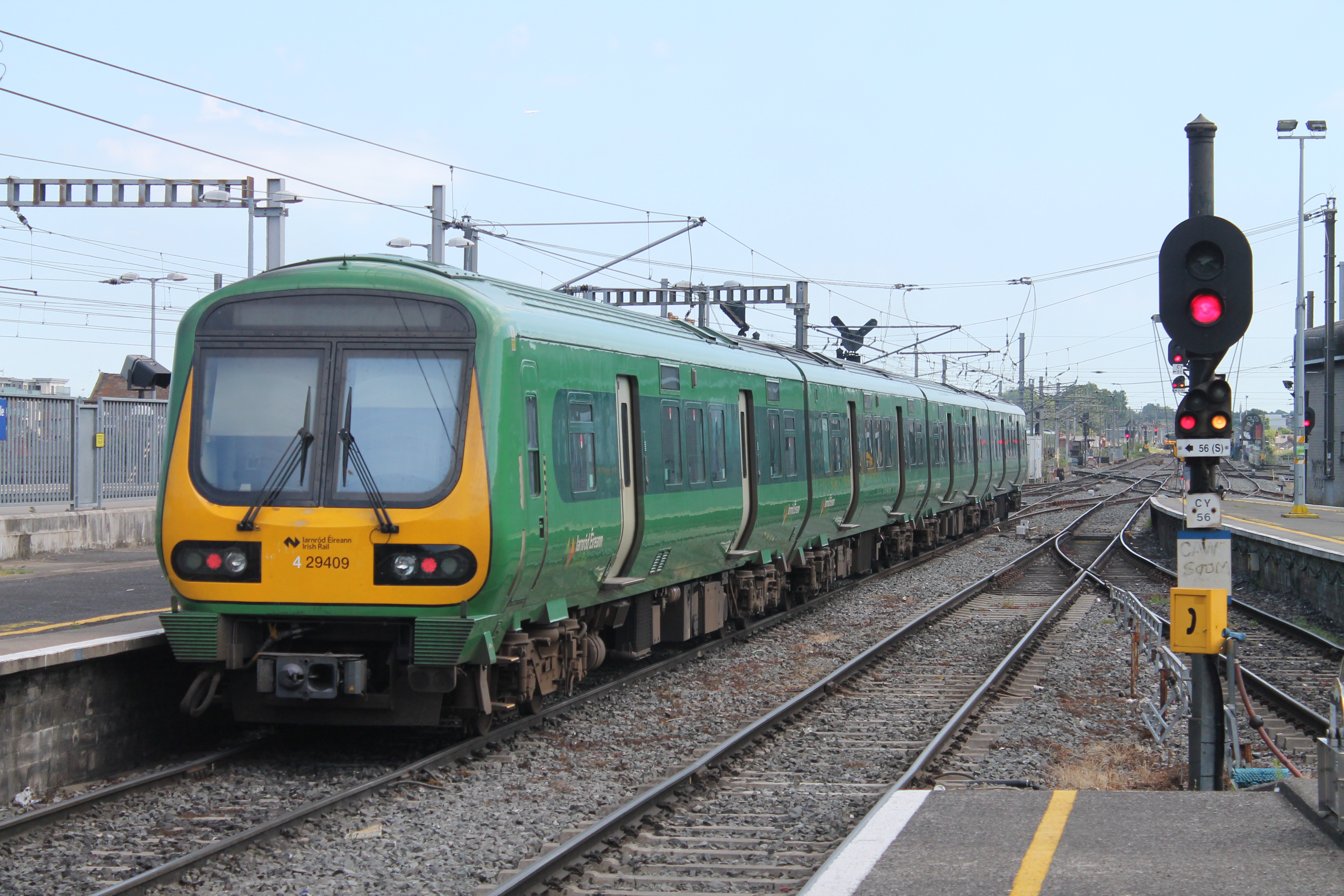
An IÉ 29000 Class train departing Dublin Connolly

The Northern Commuter service extends from Dublin City Centre to Dundalk, the South Western Commuter service extends west from Heuston Station to stations as far as Kildare and Portlaoise, Western Commuter service extends from Dublin City as far as Maynooth and Longford and the South Eastern Commuter service runs from Gorey to Dublin city. All commuter rail service runs via Dublin City Centre, and there is no orbital service of any kind.

The Western Commuter service was the last to have benefited from significant improvement with the March 2007 opening of the new Docklands railway station in Dublin City Centre, which has allowed for more capacity on the route, not previously possible due to overcrowding at Dublin Connolly.

Significant improvements on the Kildare line were undertaken in 2010 which involved quadruple-tracking on the line to allow local traffic to move independently of higher speed InterCity trains.

In September 2010, a service from the M3 Parkway via Dunboyne joining the Maynooth line just after Clonsilla was re-opened and services to Dublin City Centre (Docklands) commenced.

In November 2016, the Phoenix Park tunnel was re-opened for commuter traffic, and services from Newbridge to Grand Canal Dock were introduced.

==== DART ====
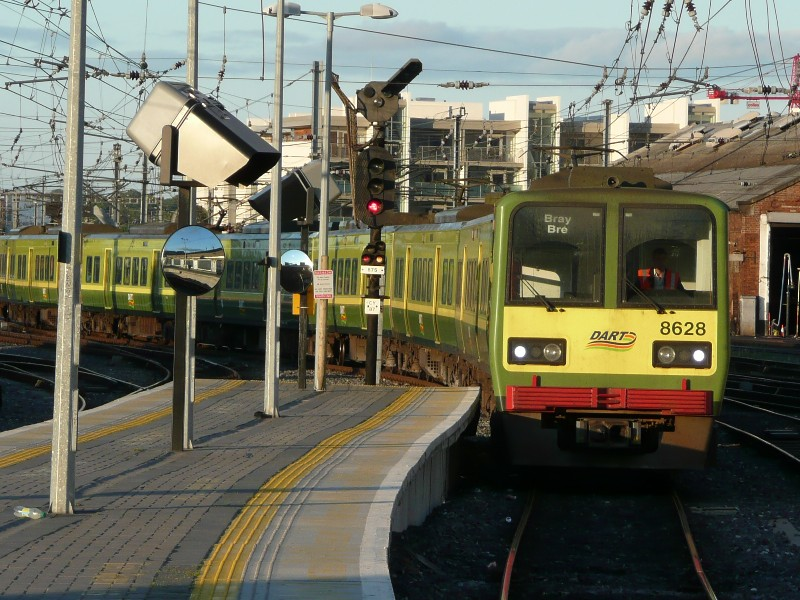
A DART train, forming part of the Dublin Suburban Rail network.

The Dublin Area Rapid Transit (DART) is part of the suburban railway network and consists of one line and a spur running primarily along the coastline of Dublin Bay, from Greystones in County Wicklow to Howth and Malahide in northern County Dublin. The DART line is the only electrified railway in the country and over 80,000 people use it every day making it arguably Ireland's greatest public transport success story.

The DART system was opened in July 1984 and like all other rail service in Dublin, it suffers from overcrowding at rush hours, with expansion plans proposed to increase its capacity by 40% to 30,000 passengers by 2035.

Plans for a proposed DART Underground project, to include a tunnel under Dublin City Centre, were shelved in 2011.

==== Light rail ====
===== Dublin tram system =====
The Dublin tram system was a tram system in operation from 1865 until its closure in 1959.

===== Luas =====
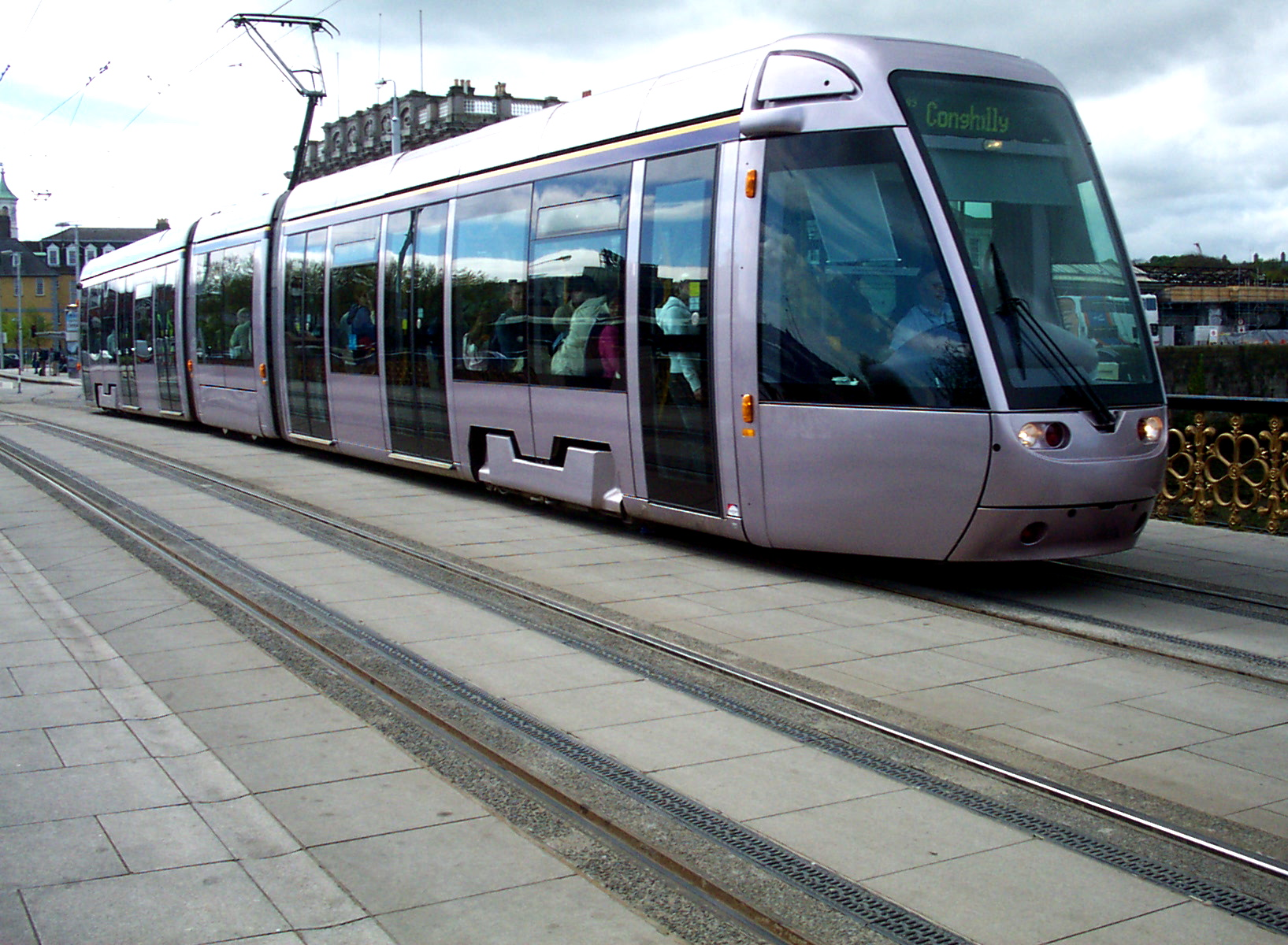
Luas Tram

A light rail tram network called the Luas, named after the Irish word for "speed". The service began with two disconnected lines in 2004, with three extensions opened in 2009, 2010 and 2011 before a cross-city link between the lines and further extension opened in 2017. Four further extensions are in the early stage of planning, with no construction currently underway.

An average of 114,520 people used the Luas every day in 2018.

In 2006, the Railway Procurement Agency announced that the Luas system reached profitability ahead of schedule, after one year of operation. It is now the only mass transit in the country to operate without Government assistance, and among a few in Europe.

The on-street light rail lines are:

- Red Line: Saggart and Tallaght to Connolly and The Point
- Green Line: Broombridge and Parnell to Sandyford and Bride's Glen.

==== MetroLink ====
A single, partially underground, rapid transit line linking Dublin Airport to Charlemont in the south city centre was subject to test drilling in December 2019. This replaced a former plan for a two-line system set out in the Irish government's 2005 Transport 21 plan.

The plans included a line, proposed to run from St. Stephens Green to Swords via Dublin Airport and the city's northern suburbs. These proposals included connections with several commuter links (Rail, DART, Luas, Metro and Bus routes) at different points in the city.

In 2011 the project was deferred, and later replaced with the MetroLink plan. As of September 2021, no start date for the MetroLink project was proposed.

=== Bus ===
Bus services in Dublin are operated for the most part by state owned Dublin Bus but a number of peripheral bus routes are provided by Go-Ahead Ireland a private operator who operate these on behalf of the NTA. There is an extensive bus network of nearly 200 radial, cross-city and peripheral routes in the Greater Dublin Area, which constitutes the bulk of the area's public transport system. There are nearly 5,000 bus stops across the city, some of which offer charging points for phones and other devices.

Daytime routes are identified by a number and sometimes suffixed with a letter (e.g. 25, 25a, 25b) and 13 night-time "Nitelink" services which run on Friday and Saturday nights (00:00-04:00) are identified by a number suffixed with "N" (e.g. 41n). As of May 2022 there are an additional seven 24-hour bus services that have been established in the city for which there is no N equivalent and daytime fares are charged all day. A report by the Night-Time Economy Taskforce in September 2021 indicated that it supports the development of eight new 24-hour bus routes in Dublin. No details have emerged yet as to what routes may become 24-hours.

Apart from some tourist buses, all bus services in Dublin are one-person operated, and daytime fares are determined by the number of fare stages travelled through — fares are payable in coin and only the exact fare is acceptable — if passengers overpay, they do not receive change. An alternative to cash is a Leap card loaded with a cash balance or a weekly or other pass. This can be bought from Dublin Bus or its agents. Flat fare journeys are processed by a validating machine on the right of the entrance door of the bus. When the fare for the journey is to be determined by the number of stages to be travelled, the validating machine on the left of the entrance door should be used and the driver informed of the destination to avoid over-deduction from the cash balance on the card. Nitelink buses charge a €6.60 flat fare (€4.50 on Leap) regardless of the distance travelled. The TFI Leap Card, introduced in December 2011, is a smart card that can be used on Dublin Bus, DART, suburban rail services in the Dublin area and the Luas.

In addition to Dublin Bus, a number of private operators provide services to Dublin Airport from all over the city and a small number of suburban routes are also provided by independent companies.

The Real Time Passenger Information Service is available across Dublin, and provides real time estimates of bus arrivals at each stop, based on GPS locations of buses. This information can also be viewed online through the Dublin Bus website and via dedicated applications for smartphones.

InterCity routes are operated by both state-owned Bus Éireann and a number of private operators such as Aircoach, Irish Citylink and JJ Kavanagh & Sons.

Bus Éireann services operate largely from Busáras, the central bus station and the busiest in Ireland, near Connolly railway station which allows passengers to avail of a sheltered area whilst waiting for their bus. There are frequent departures to all over the country.

Open-top tour buses are also offered by Dublin Bus and City Sightseeing around the city, whilst a Ghost Bus Tour runs at night through some of the supposedly haunted places in the city.

== Roads in ==
=== Motorways ===
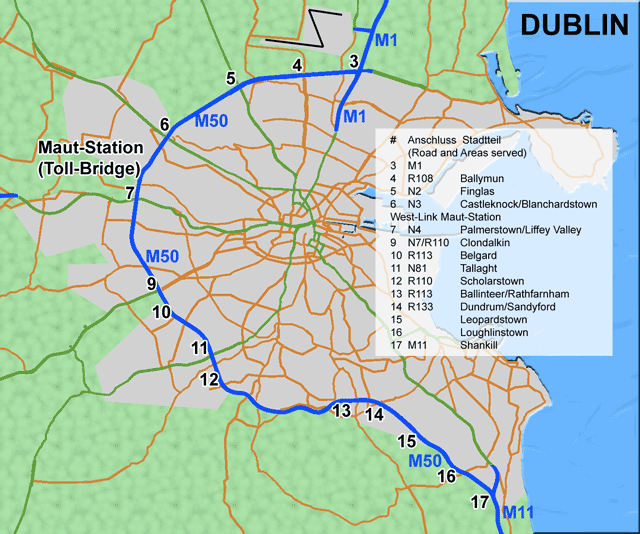
Map of M50 motorway

Greater Dublin is directly served by several motorways. The M50 motorway, arguably the most important to the city, is an intra-area thoroughfare which forms a partial ring road around the southern, western, and northern edges of the city. Construction of the M50 took almost 20 years, with the final section opening in June 2005. A court case regarding the destruction of medieval ruins at Carrickmines Castle delayed the final completion of the route.

On 20 December 2006 the Port Tunnel, which carries traffic from the port and onto the motorway close to the M50/M1 interchange, was opened as the first step of an eastern bypass for Dublin, making the M1 junctions 1 to 3 part of the M50. Though originally intended to be a two-lane single-bore system catering specifically to HGV traffic, the Port Tunnel was built to motorway standard as two separate tunnels to cater for all traffic (although HGV traffic is not tolled). The tunnels are deeper than originally planned to reduce disturbance to residential areas, and were built one kilometre longer and with more ancillary works to facilitate this. Since February 2007, 5-axle vehicles are prohibited from travelling within the city centre cordon between 7:00 and 19:00 Monday to Sunday (without a valid permit for necessary deliveries from the Dublin City Council HGV website).

The M50 originally had two traffic lanes in each direction, but this was increased to three on the southern section, and to four lanes each way between junctions on the northern and western sections. Transport Infrastructure Ireland also increased capacity at many of the motorway's busiest junctions by building triple-grade interchanges instead of the lower capacity roundabouts and crossroads that had been in place. The toll at the West-Link which caused huge tailbacks was demolished and replaced by a tag tolling system. This reduced tailbacks greatly.

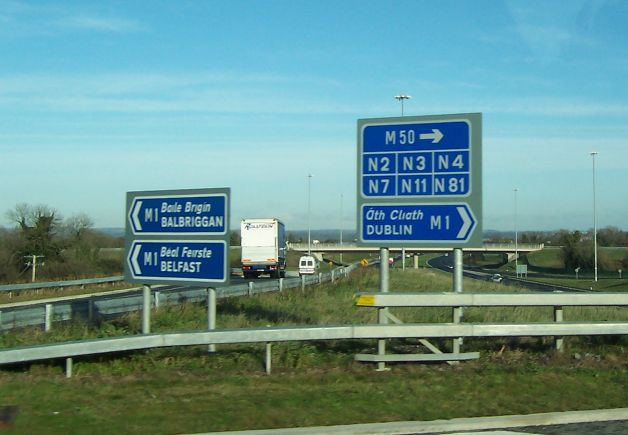
M1 roundabout at Dublin Airport

The M1, M2, M3, M4, M6, M7, M8, M9 and M11 motorways all serve the Greater Dublin Area.

=== Orbital routes ===
Dublin is surrounded by what have been termed by Dublin City Council as an inner and outer orbital route. The inner orbital route runs roughly around the heart of the Georgian city from St. Stephen's Green to Mountjoy Square and from the King's Inns to St Patrick's Cathedral. The outer orbital route runs largely along the natural circle formed by Dublin's two canals, the Grand Canal and the Royal Canal, as well as the North and South Circular Roads.

Additionally, another orbital route is being planned in the west of the city, and has been completed between the N7 and the N4 which provides an alternative to the heavily congested M50. It is planned to extend this to Tallaght, and eventually northwards to Blanchardstown, and then on to Swords in North Dublin.

Transport Infrastructure Ireland has also undertaken a study into the development of another M50 style Orbital Motorway that is being termed the "Leinster Outer Orbital route". It is planned to run from Drogheda via Navan to Naas, thus linking the M1, M2, M3, M4, M7 and M9 and via those routes, the M6 and M8. This is proposed to alleviate pressure from the M50 by taking non-Dublin bound traffic completely out of the Dublin road network, as well as providing links between Dublin's satellite and commuter towns.

=== Dublin Bikes ===
Dublin Bikes is a public bicycle rental scheme which has been operated in the city of Dublin since 2009. The scheme uses 1600 French-made unisex bicycles with a silver colour. Dublin was the 17th city to begin using this scheme (predecessors include Copenhagen, Lyon, and Paris), though Dublin City Council suggested the Dublin launch was better. The scheme is operated by JCDecaux, and sponsored by Just Eat.

=== Car sharing ===
Two car-sharing systems operate in Dublin, GoCar, which is owned by Europcar; and Yuko, which is owned by Toyota

=== Cycling infrastructure ===
The main provision for cycling in Dublin is a combination of advisory and mandatory cycle lanes or lanes shared with buses and public service vehicles.

The Greater Dublin Area Cycle Network, proposed in 2013, calls for additional cycle infrastructure for the Greater Dublin Area.

== Background ==
The Planning and Development Act (PDA, 1963) allowed for control of development by means of planning permissions, however it lacked tools to improve infrastructure. The following Dublin County Council's development plans also lacked detailed plans on integrating the transportation and land-use developments.

Guidance on transportation planning was provided by three studies: Dublin Transportation Study (DTS, 1971); Dublin Rail Rapid Transit Study (DRRTS, 1975); and Dublin Transportation Initiative (DTI, 1988). The DTS was primarily focused on the private car, besides a few suggested high speed bus routes and a few bus lanes on existing roads. The DTI document was criticised for the lack of attention for public transportation. The DRRTS evaluated several public transport options, including an underground, a light rail system and separate bus-ways. After analysis, the preferred option was to build a central city underground connecting to existing tracks to keep costs manageable.

The DTI contained outlines for a strategy for the 1991-2011 period. Suggestions -amongst improved cycling infrastructure- were:

- "Completion of the outer C-ring motorway,
- Traffic calming measures in the city centre,
- Development of eleven quality bus corridors,
- Extension of the DART and capacity improvements on the railways,
- Development of the light rail transit routes from city centre to Cabinteely, Tallaght and Ballymun,
- Development of park-and-ride facilities at the strategic outer suburban locations."

=== Modal share ===
The transport modal share for Dublin city centre, as calculated by Dublin City Council was:

Modal share
| Mode | 2007 | 2012 | 2017 |
|---|---|---|---|
| Bus | 28.1% | 28.0% | 28.8% |
| Rail | 17.5% | 12.9% | 16.3% |
| LUAS | 4.5% | 5.4% | 5.7% |
| Car | 35.1% | 37.0% | 29.2% |
| Taxi | 1.1% | 1.8% | 1.2% |
| Walk | 9.1% | 9.2% | 11.8% |
| Cycle | 2.8% | 4.3% | 5.9% |
| Goods | 0.7% | 0.6% | 0.5% |
| Motor bikes | 1.2% | 0.8% | 0.7% |

== Water traffic ==
=== Canals ===
The Grand Canal at Wilton Terrace

Dublin has two major canals, the Royal Canal and the Grand Canal in the northern and southern portions of the city respectively. The canals were originally built for freight and passenger transportation from the River Liffey at Dublin to the River Shannon in western Ireland. Today, the canals, run by Waterways Ireland, are fully operable but are used only occasionally for pleasure craft.

=== Ports ===
Dublin is served by a major port which handles a mixture of passengers and freight to and from the UK, Dublin Port, which is situated just outside the city centre, with a bus from Dublin Connolly connecting with the trains.

==== Dublin Port ====
Dublin Port is situated closer to the city centre than Dún Laoghaire Harbour. It operates up to 18 daily sailings to the UK and the continent. Locations include Liverpool, Holyhead and Birkenhead, with passenger service to Liverpool and Birkenhead being replaced by freight only. The port carried 30.9 million tonnes of goods and passengers in 2007. 19.9 million tonnes of this was made up of material being imported and 10.9 million tonnes was material for export. The port also handles about 1.3 million tourists yearly. The port is only minutes from Dublin city centre and is accessed by a number of Dublin Bus routes. Taxis are also an easy way to get to the port.

==== Dún Laoghaire ====
Dún Laoghaire harbour is situated about 13.6 km from Dublin city centre. It is easily accessible by road, rail and bus. Three Dublin Bus routes serve the harbour. The DART rail system serves Dún Laoghaire harbour from both Malahide and Howth in the north which en route to Dún Laoghaire goes straight the city centre. It is also served from Greystones in the south.

== Air transport ==
Dublin Airport Terminal 1 entrance in 2003

Both domestic and international air traffic in Dublin are served by Dublin Airport, which is located 10 km north of Dublin city centre in Collinstown and is accessible by car or bus. It is the busiest airport in Ireland by far, with 32.9 million passengers in 2019, making it the 12th busiest airport in Europe. There are flights to other airports in Ireland, Europe, North America, Africa and the Middle East. The Dublin–London flight route (to London City, Gatwick, Heathrow, Luton and Stansted) is the single biggest city-city route in all of Europe and the 2nd biggest route in the world. The route between London Heathrow and Dublin Airport alone is the 10th busiest route in Europe.

== Appraisal ==
In May 2023, Dublin was ranked the worst for public transport among 30 European capital cities by environmental campaign group Greenpeace, in a study based on affordability and simplicity for users in purchasing tickets.

== See also ==
- Transport in Ireland
- Rail transport in Ireland
- Roads in Ireland
