= Commission for Taxi Regulation =

Public body in Ireland

The Commission for Taxi Regulation (also An Coimisiún Um Rialáil Tacsaithe and Taxi Regulator) was a public body in Ireland that existed between 2004 and 2011 regulating small public service vehicles (SPSVs) - the generic term for taxis, wheelchair accessible taxis, hackneys and limousines.

Taxis and wheelchair-accessible taxis are allowed to pick up passengers in the street or at a stand and have their fares calculated by a meter; hackneys and limousines do not use meters and are not permitted to pick up passengers in the street or at a stand.

The Commission set a single maximum fare structure for taxis for all places in Ireland, although drivers are allowed to offer discounts and customers are permitted to give tips to drivers.

Kathleen Doyle was appointed the Commissioner for Taxi Regulation in 2007.

The first Commissioner, Ger Deering, was appointed in 2004. He had previously been Assistant County Manager at Carlow County Council. In 2007, he left the Commission and was appointed as director of the National Employment Rights Authority.

Prior to the creation of the Commission, taxi licence fees were paid to local authorities, but were paid to the Commission while it existed.

The Commission had been criticised for issuing more taxi licences than some drivers consider appropriate.

Its commissioner has appeared before a joint committee of the Oireachtas (parliament) of Ireland to discuss the work of the Commission.

The Commission was dissolved when Part 4 of the Public Transport Regulation Act 2009 came into force on 1 January 2011. Its functions have been transferred to the National Transport Authority.
