= Public transport operators in Dublin =

Many companies operate public transport services in Dublin, most of which are state-owned or semi-state-owned.

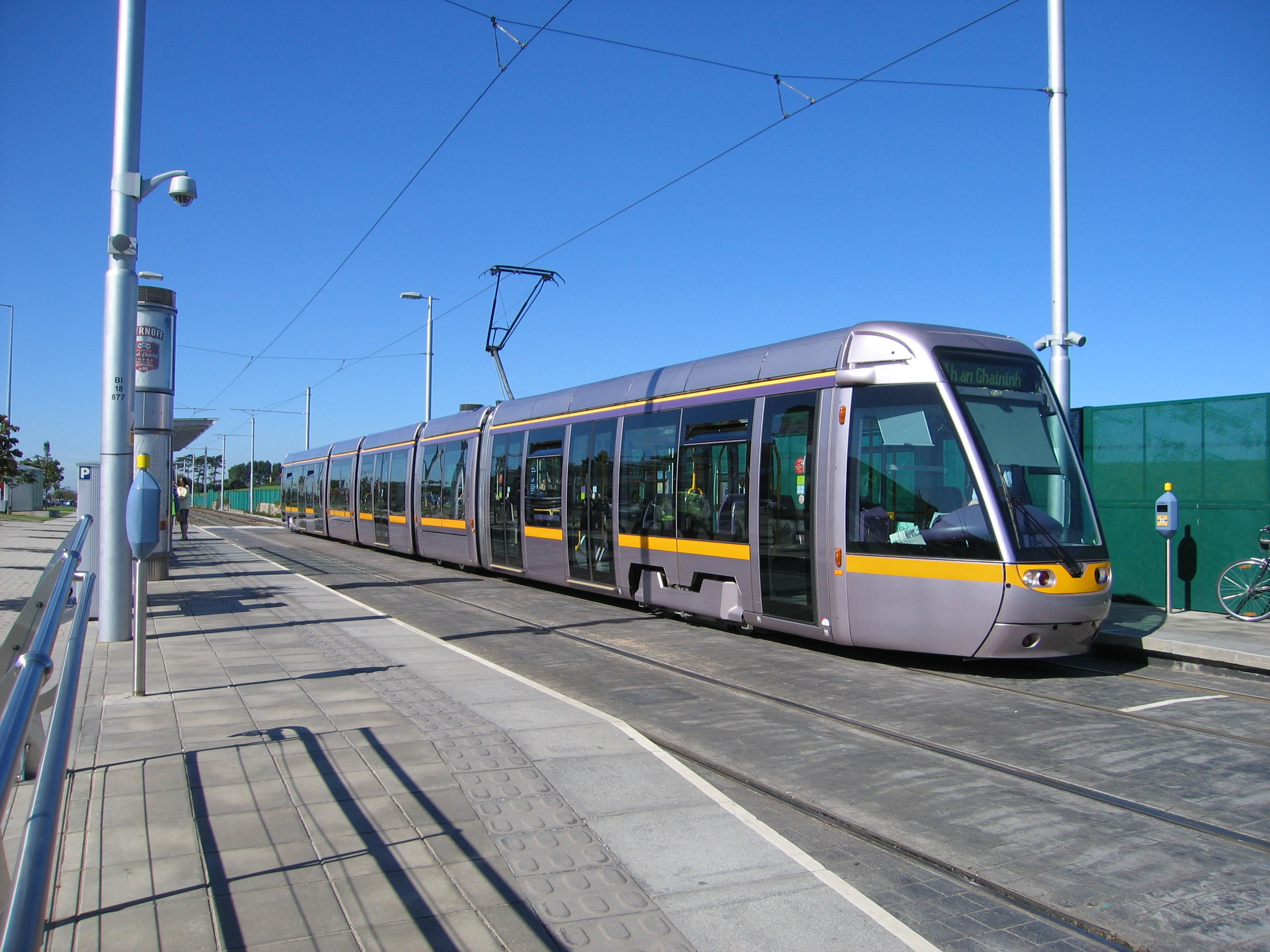
LUAS tram at Green Line terminus in Sandyford

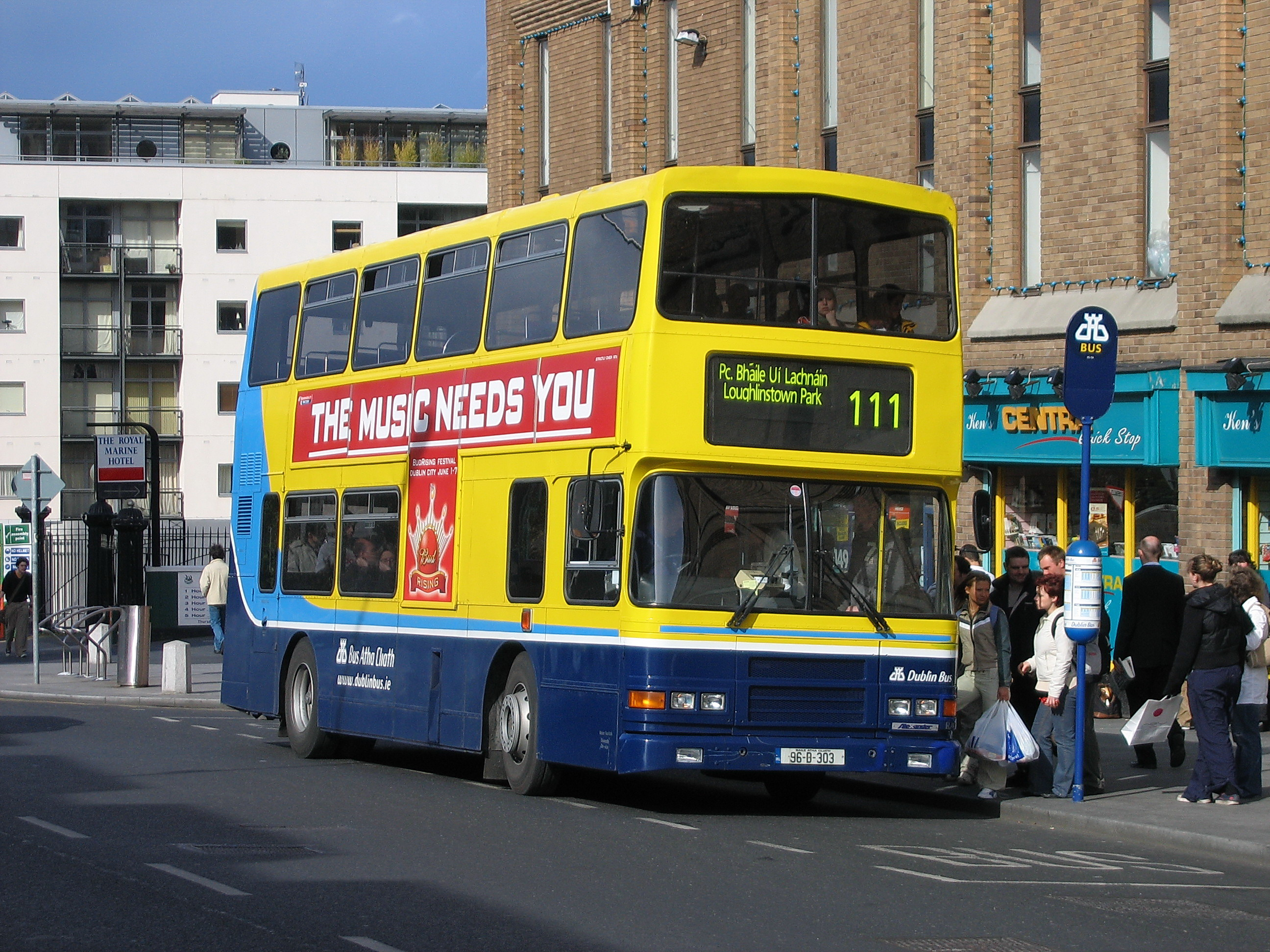
Dublin Bus double-decker in Dún Laoghaire

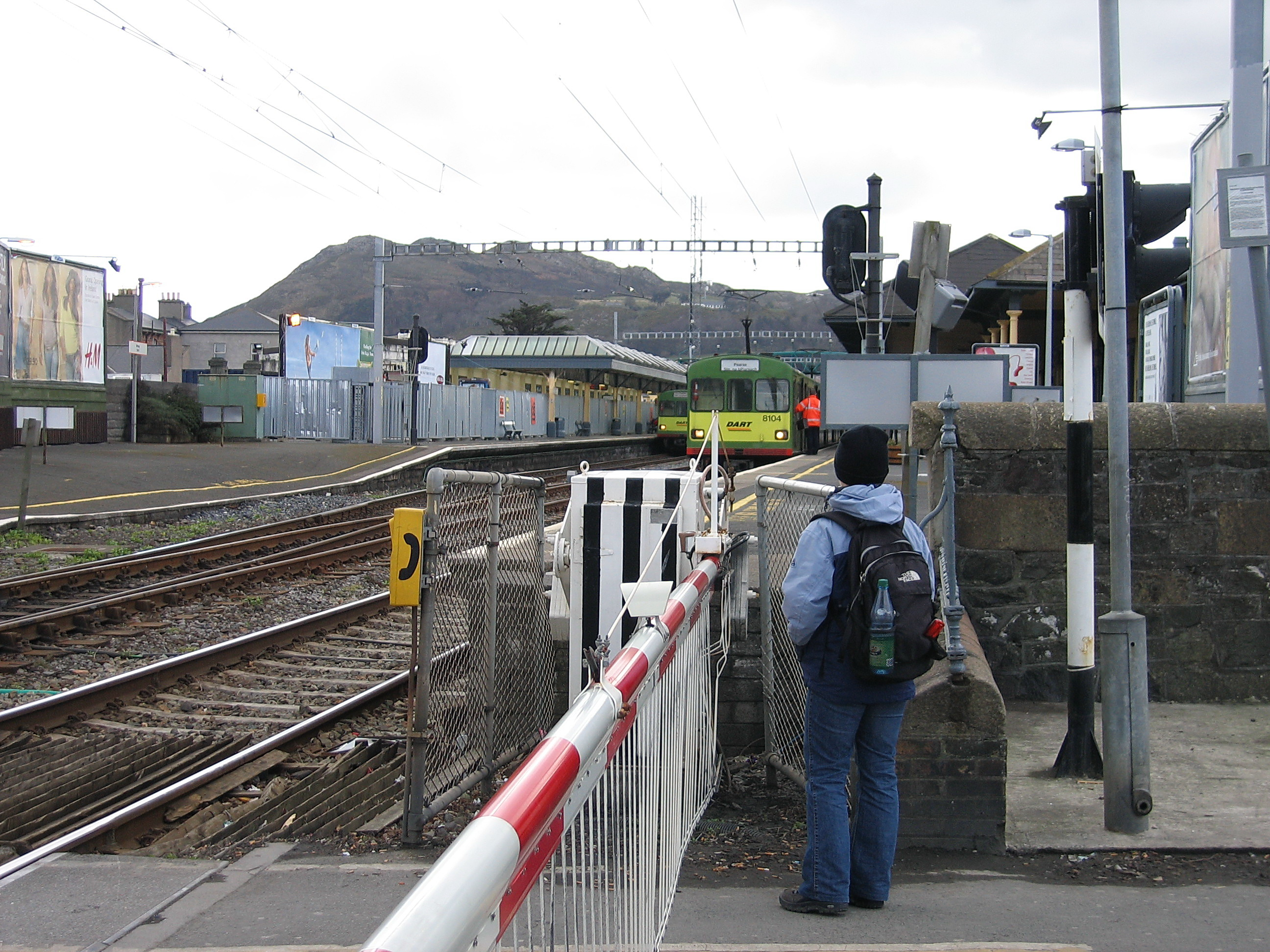
DART trains at Bray Railway Station

== Rail ==
- Iarnród Éireann, also known as Irish Rail a subsidiary of state-owned Córas Iompair Éireann, operates all rail services in Dublin including the DART.

== Light rail ==
- Dublin's Luas light rail system is owned by the state-owned Transport Infrastructure Ireland and operated on its behalf by Transdev. It was previously operated by Veolia Transport Ireland (formerly known as Connex). There are currently two Luas tram lines in the city, the Red and Green.

== Bus ==
Historically, bus services in Dublin were operated mainly by the Dublin United Transport Company, which was incorporated into CIÉ in 1945.

Today, two subsidiary companies of state-owned Córas Iompair Éireann operate most of the bus services in and around Dublin but many other private companies also provide services.

Most routes are awarded to the state-owned firms by non-tendered direct award (with the exception of Dublin Bus Airlink and Bus Éireann Expressway services, which are entirely commercial); but recently a portion of both firms routes were offered for public tender. Neither firm retained these routes, with Go-Ahead Ireland winning both contracts

Some additional routes are tendered where a need is identified by the National Transport Authority. These are public service obligation routes and occasionally replace sections of withdrawn or altered Bus Éireann Expressway services.

=== City and local services ===
==== State-owned ====
- Dublin Bus operates the vast majority of bus services in Dublin, including night services on Fridays and Saturdays and some limited 24h services.

==== State-tendered ====
- Go-Ahead Ireland operate approximately 10% of the total Dublin network, primarily consisting of routes transferred from Dublin Bus after it won a competitive tender process.
- Go-Ahead additionally won the tender for the 197 service from Swords to Ashbourne which began operating on 24 November 2019. This does not operate as part of the Dublin network.
- JJ Kavanagh & Sons operate the 139 service from Naas to Blanchardstown in Dublin on behalf of the National Transport Authority.

==== Private ====
- Aircoach operates 3 express routes from Dublin Airport in the Dublin area, including the City Centre, Ballsbridge, Donnybrook, Leperodstown, Cherrywood, Stillorgan and Greystones.
- Airport Hopper operate two services between Tallaght and Maynooth and Dublin Airport
- Ashbourne Connect operate services between Ashbourne & Ratoath and the city
- Balbriggan Express operates between Balbriggan and the city
- Dublin Coach operate services from Dublin Airport to Dundrum and Portlaoise.
- Express Bus operates various routes, primarily connecting business parks including Park West to the city or public transport nodes.
- Finnegan's operate a local service in Bray, County Wicklow Route 144 from the southern cross road to Bray DART station and main shopping areas of Bray, and another route, Route 143 Bray Southern Cross via Shankill, Loughlinstown, Cherrywood, Cabinteely bypass, Foxrock to Sandyford LUAS terminus
- Nolan Coaches, provides transfers between Heuston railway station and the Dublin Port for ferry foot passengers on behalf Stena Line and Irish Ferries.
- St Kevin's Bus Service operates a 7-day service between Glendalough, County Wicklow and Dublin city centre.
- Swords Express Between Dublin City Centre and Swords Manor via Applewood, Pavilion Shopping centre Swords, River Valley, Boroimhe using the Dublin Port Tunnel.

=== Longer distance and express services ===
==== State-owned ====
- Bus Éireann operates many long-distance and express services to/from Dublin.

==== State-tendered ====
- Go-Ahead Ireland won a competitive tender to take over a group of services from Dublin to the County Kildare area from Bus Éireann which began operations between 1 December 2019 and 19 January 2020, replacing Bus Éireann on these routes
- Bernard Kavanagh & Sons operate a National Transport Authority PSO service between Kilkenny and Dublin

==== Private ====
- Aircoach run 18 express non-stop coach service a day between Dublin and Cork with a journey time of three hours to/from Dublin city centre and three and a half hours to/from Dublin Airport. They also operate 22 daily non-stop services from Belfast to Dublin City via Dublin Airport.
- Ardcavan operates daily services between Dublin and Wellington Bridge, Wexford town and Enniscorthy.
- Bernard Kavanagh & Sons operates a daily service between Tipperary town and Dublin city centre.
- CityLink operates a frequent daily service between Galway, Dublin city centre and Dublin Airport
- Collins Coaches operates a commuter service between Carrickmacross, County Monaghan and Dublin city centre, with some services extended to/from Clones
- Dublin Coach run services to Dublin Airport from Cork (via Waterford), Ennis, Limerick, Portlaoise and Killarney to Dublin Airport, with some services hubbing via the Red Cow Luas stop.
- JJ Kavanagh & Sons operates a number of routes between Waterford, Clonmel, Limerick and Dublin City Centre, some also serving Dublin Airport.
- John McGinley Coaches operates services from County Donegal to Dublin Airport and the city centre.
- Matthews Coaches operates two daily routes: an express service from Dundalk and a frequent service to Bettystown and Laytown. Their Dublin terminus is Parnell Street.
- Sillan Tours operates commuter services between Dublin and Shercock and Cootehill via Navan.
- Slieve Bloom Coach Tours operates services between Dublin and Longford, Mullingar, Tullamore and Geashill via the N4 and between Dublin and Mountmellick and Portlaoise via the N7.
- Wexford Bus Operates express coaches throughout the day and night connecting Wexford, Enniscorthy, Ferns, Camolin, Gorey and Arklow with Dublin City and Airport

== See also ==
- List of Irish companies
