= Greater Dublin Area Cycle Network =

Cycling network in Dublin, Ireland

- Location: Greater Dublin Area
- Proposer: Department of Transport, Tourism and Sport
- Status: Proposed
- Type: Cycling infrastructure

The Greater Dublin Area Cycle Network is a proposed cycle network for the Greater Dublin Area. The plan was launched in 2013.

A target, endorsed by the Irish government, proposed that the number of people commuting into Dublin would reach "75,000 each morning by 2021", representing a "three-fold increase in cycling over 2011 levels". A significant part of the proposed plan, as published in 2013, expected that the Greater Dublin Area's cycle network would increase "five fold" from 500 km in length to over 2,800 km by 2020. The planned targets were not met.

In August 2018, 78 companies and third-level education institutions called on the government to build a network of segregated cycle routes in Dublin. This call was reiterated by the National Children's Hospital and St. James's Hospital in 2019. The letter from St James's Hospital to the Minister for Transport cited worrying levels of air pollution, adding,

The increasing level of inactivity among adults and children is alarming. Regular physical activity can help protect from serious diseases such as obesity, heart disease, cancer, mental illness, diabetes and arthritis. Cycling is an ideal form of physical activity, but the lack of safe cycling infrastructure is a significant barrier to increasing the uptake of such an active means of commuting, be it for work, school or leisure purposes.

In mid-2021, the National Transport Authority (NTA) website noted that "the NTA [..was then..] in the process of updating the GDA Cycle Network Plan" and that it planned to publish this update "later in 2021".

In January 2023, the NTA announced that the network, which includes the Urban Network, Inter-Urban Network, and Green Route Network across the seven Local Authority areas of the GDA, was incorporated into the GDA Transport Strategy 2022-2042.
