= Greater Dublin Area =

- Metropolitan area
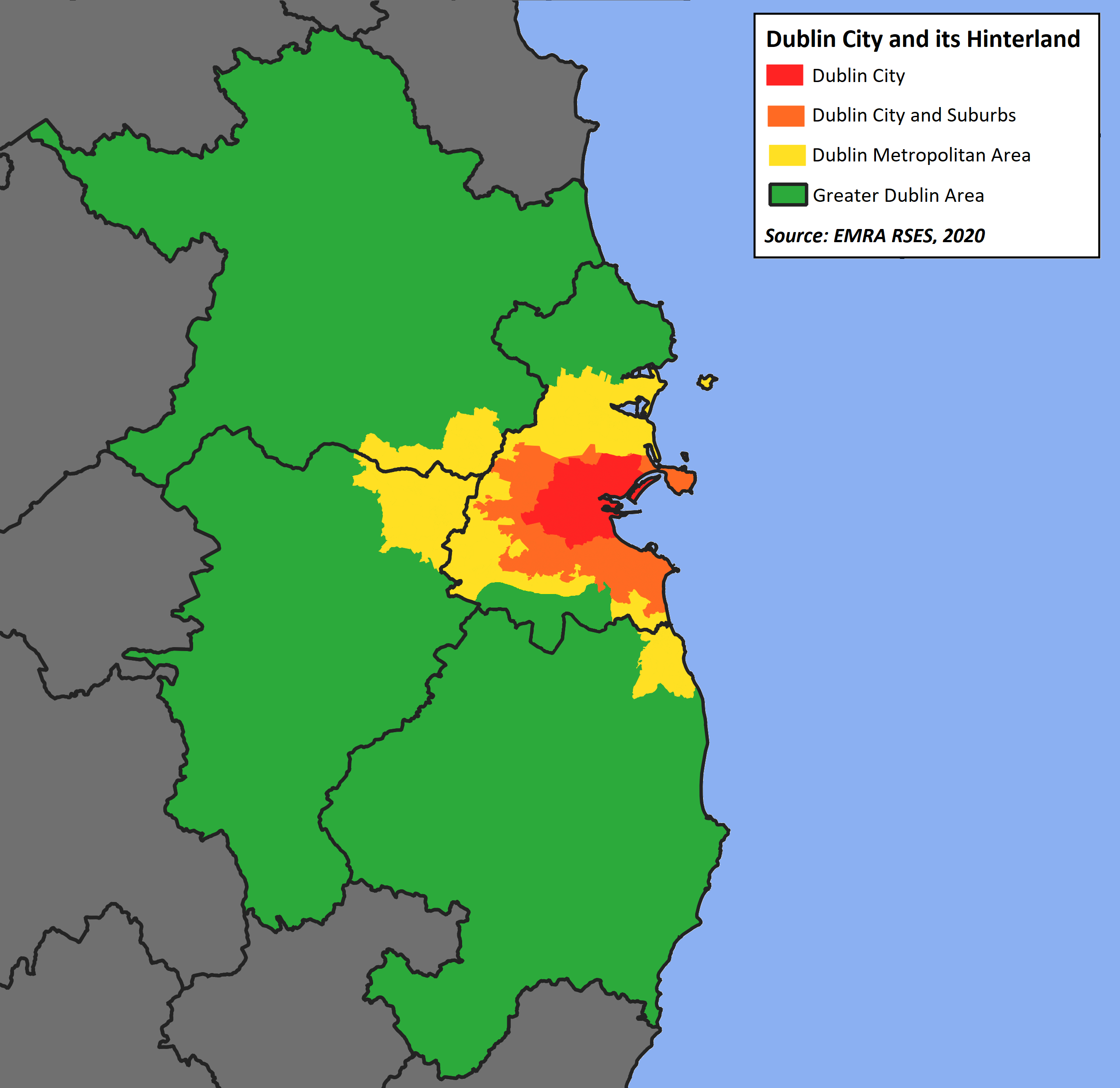
- Map of Dublin and its hinterland, showing: Dublin city (red), city and suburbs (orange), Dublin Metropolitan Area (Yellow), Greater Dublin Area (NTA) (Green)

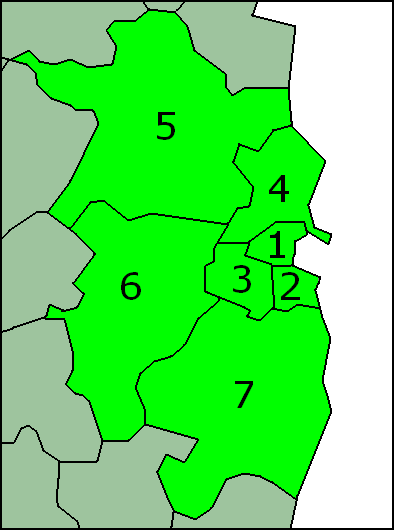
- Maximal definition: 1. Dublin city, 2. Dún Laoghaire–Rathdown, 3. South Dublin, 4. Fingal, 5. Meath, 6. Kildare 7. Wicklow
- Country: Ireland

Area
  - Total: 6,986 km^{2} (2,697 sq mi)

Population (2024 estimate)
  - Total: 2,159,000
  - Density: 309.0/km^{2} (800.4/sq mi)

GDP
  - Metro: €230.366 billion (2021)
- Time zone: UTC
  - Summer (DST): UTC+1:00
- Eircode (post code zones): D01–D17, D02–D24, A41, A45, A63, A67, A82–A86, A91, A92, A96, A98, C15, K32, K36, K45, K56, K67, K78, R56, W91, Y14, Y21
- Area codes: 01, 041, 042, 045, 046, 0402, 0404

The Greater Dublin Area (GDA; Irish: Mórcheantar Bhaile Átha Cliath), or Greater Dublin, is an informal term that is taken to include the city of Dublin and its hinterland, with varying definitions as to its extent. At the expansive end, it has been defined as including all of County Dublin and three neighbouring counties, while more commonly it is taken as the contiguous metropolitan area of Dublin plus suburban and commuter towns. The area is defined for strategic planning, and, for example, transport, and it is not a formal administrative or political unit.

The area has a broadly similar outline to the medieval Pale area which was under English control.

== Definitions ==
=== Planning usage ===
The 2003 Regional Planning Guidelines referred to the Greater Dublin Area as a planning district separated into a "metropolitan area" and a "hinterland area".

The "metropolitan area" included both suburbs and commuter towns, covering the area from Swords and Malahide in Fingal, to Greystones in County Wicklow in the south, and as far west as Kilcock in County Kildare. This area differs from the Garda "metropolitan region" scope, in that it stretches approximately 20 km further west.

The Dublin Metropolitan Area is now defined as:

Local government area	Area within DMA
Dublin city	Whole territory
Dún Laoghaire–Rathdown	County, except for parts of the electoral divisions of Tibradden and Glencullen comprising the townlands of Stackstown, Ticknock, Kilmashogue, Tibradden, Ballybrack, Glendoo, Boranaraltry, Glencullen Mountain and Brockery.
South Dublin	County, except for parts of Rathcoole, Saggart, Ballinacorny and Bohernabreen comprising the townlands of Aghfarrell, Allagour, Ballinascorney (Lower and Upper), Ballymaice, Ballymorefinn, Belgard Deer Park, Brittas (Big and Little), Calliaghstown Upper, Castlekelly, Corrageen, Cunard, Friarstown Lower, Glassamucky, Glassamucky Brakes, Glassamucky Mountain, Glassavullaun, Glenaraneen, Glendoo, Gortlum, Killakee, Lugg, Mountpelier, Mountseskin, Piperstown, Raheen, Slademore, Slievethoul and parts of the townlands of Crockaunadreenagh*, Crooksling*, Cruagh*, Ballymana, Calliaghstown Lower, Coolmine, Corbally, Jamestown (ED Whitechurch), Killinardan, Kiltalown, Lugmore*, Kiltipper, Newtown Upper, Orlagh, Redgap, Saggart, Slade, Tibradden and Woodtown. * These townlands are more than 50% in the hinterland area.
Fingal	Electoral divisions including Airport, Baldoyle, Balgriffin, Blanchardstown (Abbotstown, Blakestown, Coolmine, Corduff, Delwood, Mulhuddart, Roselawn, Tyrrelstown), Castleknock (Knockmaroon, Park), Donabate, Dubber, Howth, Kilsallaghan, Kinsaley, Lucan North, Malahide (East and West), Portmarnock (North and South), Sutton, Swords (Forrest, Glasmore, Lissenhall, Seatown, Village), The Ward, Turnapin.
County Kildare	Electoral divisions of Celbridge, Donaghcumper, Kilcock, Leixlip, Maynooth, Straffan.
County Meath	Electoral divisions of Dunboyne and Rodanstown.
County Wicklow	Electoral divisions of Bray No.1, Bray No. 2, Bray No. 3, Rathmichael, Delgany, Greystones and the following townlands in the Kilmacanogue electoral division: Corrigoona Commons West, Corrigoona Commons East, Glencormick North, Glencormick South, Kilcroney, Wingfield, Hollybrook, Kilmacanogue North, Kilmacanogue South, and Barchuillia Commons.

The Dublin "Hinterland" area is aligned with the Draft National Planning Framework, which defines city regions or urban hinterlands as those EDs where at least 15% of the workforce (Full POWCAR) are employed in the Dublin Metropolitan Area (NTA boundary).

=== Dublin Transport Authority ===
At the broader end of definitions, the Dublin Transport Authority Act 2008 defines the Greater Dublin Area as including the counties of Dublin (Dublin City, South Dublin, Dún Laoghaire–Rathdown and Fingal), Meath, Kildare, and Wicklow; as of 2022, its estimated population is 2,073,459.

==== Former boundaries ====
The urban part of Dublin and surrounding areas has been defined by various statutory instruments, mainly those referring to the Garda Síochána and Courts of the Republic of Ireland. The city, three other counties within the traditional County Dublin, and three neighbouring counties, were grouped together in the order creating the Dublin Transportation Office, giving functions and representations to the office in this area, although not using the term. The office was purely advisory and had no executive powers. The term was later defined in section 3 of the Dublin Transport Authority Act 2008. On 1 December 2009 the DTO became the National Transport Authority, with a remit expanding beyond the Greater Dublin Area.

=== Garda usage ===
The Garda used the term the Dublin Metropolitan Region (DMR) which was formerly the jurisdiction, within the eastern part of Ireland, of the Dublin Metropolitan Police, which was subsequently merged into the Garda Síochána, the national police force of Ireland. The term originated from the Police Forces Amalgamation Act 1925, which amalgamated the Dublin Metropolitan Police and Garda Síochána as one national police force.

This jurisdiction covered parts of the old County Dublin (except the northern part around Swords) as well as the County Kildare town of Leixlip and the County Wicklow towns of Bray, Greystones and Enniskerry. Swords was covered by the Meath Garda Division. In this way, it differed from the usual definition of County Dublin and did not even conform to the looser definition of the Greater Dublin Area.

The definition no longer applies, as during 2008 the Garda divisions were realigned along Regional and county boundaries. As of 2009, the Dublin Metropolitan Region is co-extensive with the combined area of the city of Dublin, and the counties of Dún Laoghaire–Rathdown, Fingal and South Dublin. Leixlip was moved to the County Kildare Division and became the district headquarters for the new Leixlip District. Bray moved into the new County Wicklow Division and became district headquarters for the Bray District.

== Population ==
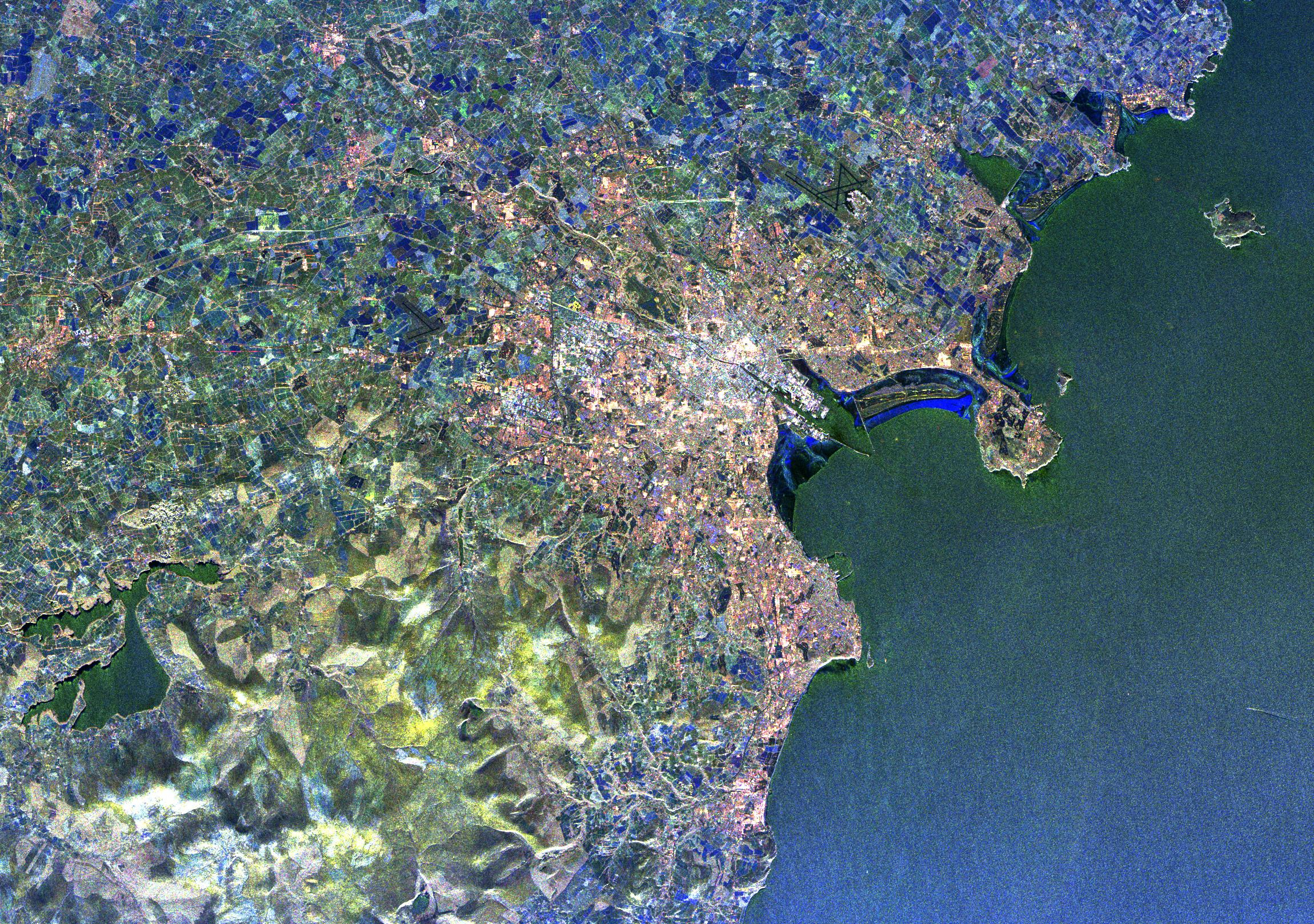
Satellite view of part of the Greater Dublin area

The population of the Dublin City and County (Dublin City, Fingal, South Dublin and Dún Laoghaire–Rathdown) and Outer Greater Dublin (Meath, Kildare and Wicklow) as of the 2022 census was 2,082,605 persons. This equates to 40.5% of Ireland's population. Estimates published by the Central Statistics Office suggest that the population will reach 2.4 million by 2026. The figures are based on a regional breakdown of previously published national population projections and assume that current demographic trends will continue.

The CSO also uses the narrower definition which comprises Dublin City and its suburbs within the 3 local Dublin authorities. The boundaries for suburbs are not legally defined, but drawn and revised by the CSO in accordance with United Nations recommendations. The population distribution of the Greater Dublin Area as of the 2011, 2016 and 2022 censuses was as follows:

Population of the Greater Dublin Area per the 2011,2016 and 2022 national censuses
	Administrative division		Population			Population increase 2016 to 2022
	Administrative division		2011	2016	2022	Population increase 2016 to 2022
Greater Dublin Area	Dublin Region					
Greater Dublin Area	Dublin Region	Dublin City	527,612	553,165	592,713	35,068
Greater Dublin Area	Dublin Region	Dún Laoghaire–Rathdown	206,261	217,274	233,860	16,183
Greater Dublin Area	Dublin Region	Fingal	273,991	296,214	330,506	33,004
Greater Dublin Area	Dublin Region	South Dublin	265,205	278,749	301,705	21,044
Greater Dublin Area	Dublin Region	County Dublin	1,273,069	1,345,402	1,458,154	105,299
Greater Dublin Area	County Meath		184,135	194,942	220,826	25,252
Greater Dublin Area	County Kildare		210,312	222,130	247,774	24,473
Greater Dublin Area	County Wicklow		136,640	142,332	155,851	13,060
Greater Dublin Area	Meath, Kildare, Wicklow		531,087	559,404	624,451	63,354
Greater Dublin Area	Greater Dublin Area (max. def.)		1,804,156	1,904,806	2,082,605	168,653

=== Historical ===
Population of the Greater Dublin Area, 1841–2022
Census year	Population	Population change since previous census		Percentage of population of Ireland
1841	683,232	?		10.5%
1851	740,597	▲57,365	in 10 years	▲14.5%
1861	698,050	▼ -42,547	in 10 years	▲15.9%
1871	663,131	▼ -34,919	in 10 years	▲16.4%
1881	652,569	▼ -10,562	in 10 years	▲16.9%
1891	628,539	▼ -24,030	in 10 years	▲18.1%
1901	640,093	▲11,554	in 10 years	▲19.9%
1911	669,625	▲29,532	in 10 years	▲21.3%
1926	685,242	▲15,617	in 15 years	▲23.1%
1936	774,791	▲89,549	in 10 years	▲26.1%
1946	827,725	▲52,934	in 10 years	▲28.0%
1961	906,347	▲78,622	in 15 years	▲32.2%
1971	1,062,220	▲155,873	in 10 years	▲35.7%
1981	1,290,154	▲227,934	in 10 years	▲37.5%
1986	1,336,119	▲45,965	in 5 years	▲37.8%
1991	1,350,595	▲14,476	in 5 years	▲38.3%
1996	1,405,671	▲55,076	in 5 years	▲38.8%
2002	1,535,446	▲129,775	in 6 years	▲39.2%
2006	1,662,536	▲127,090	in 4 years	39.2%
2011	1,801,040	▲138,504	in 5 years	▲39.3%
2016	1,904,806	▲103,766	in 5 years	▲40.0%
2022	2,082,605	▲177,799	in 6 years	▲40.4%

== Gallery ==
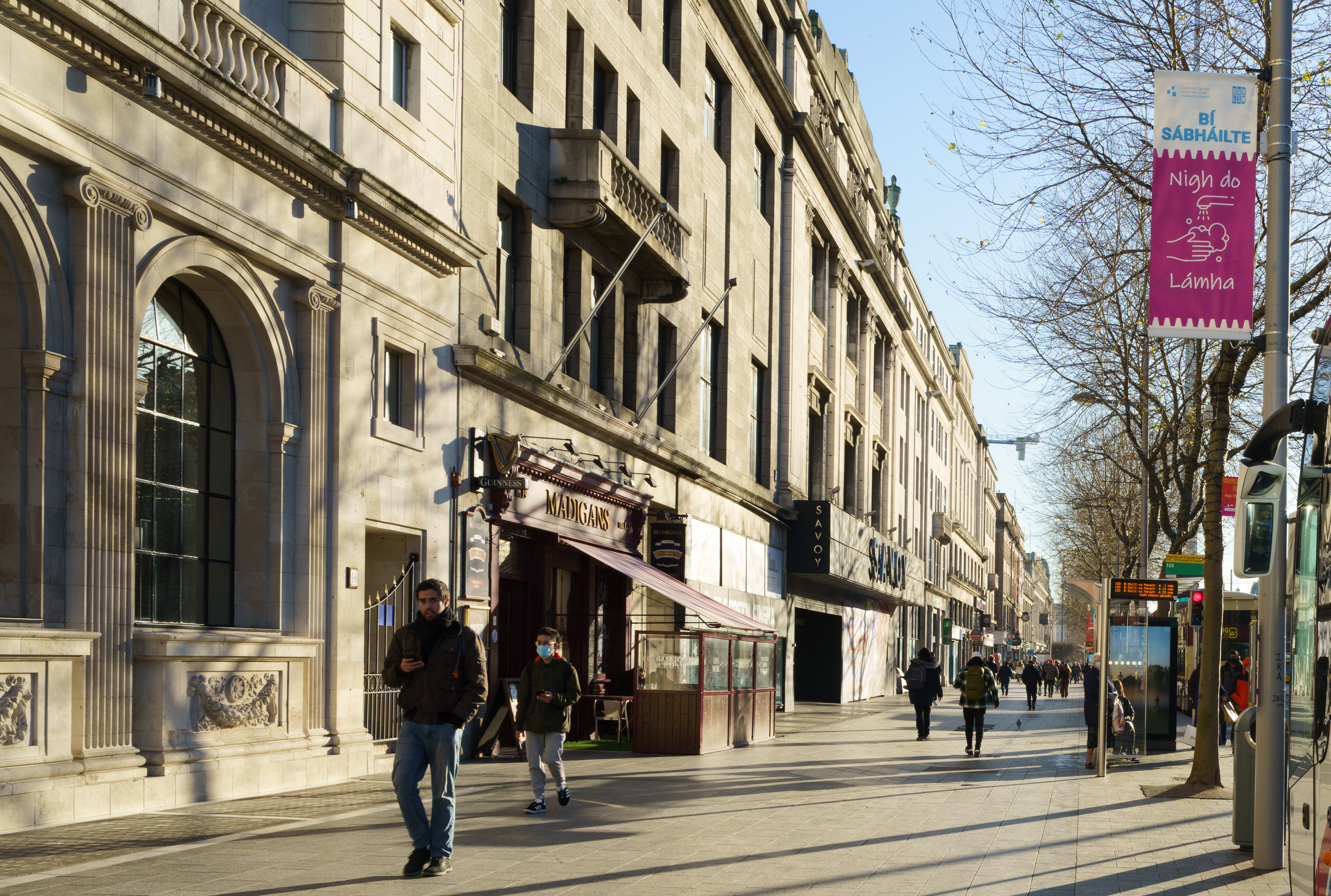
Upper O'Connell Street in central Dublin city

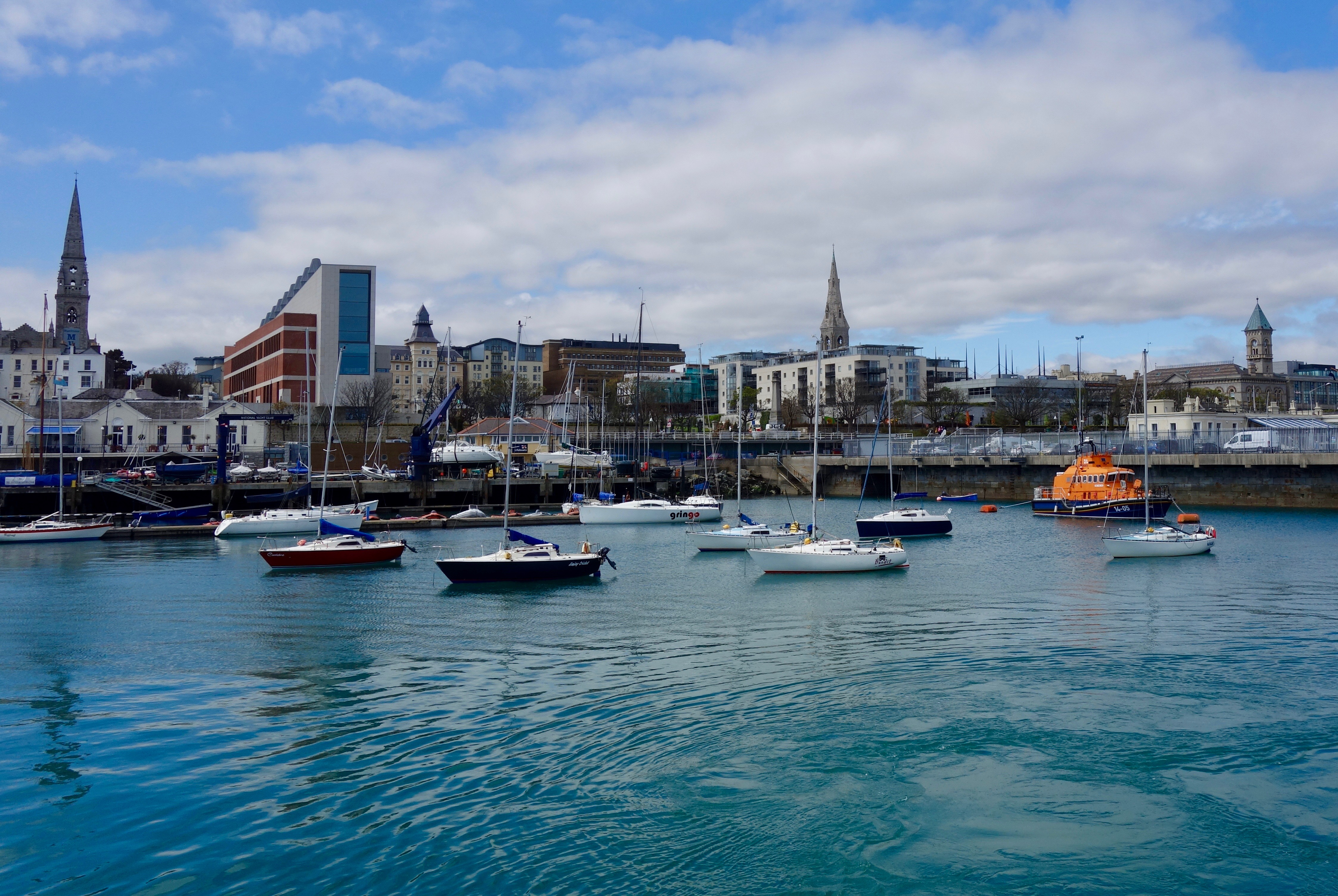
Dún Laoghaire harbour in Dún Laoghaire-Rathdown

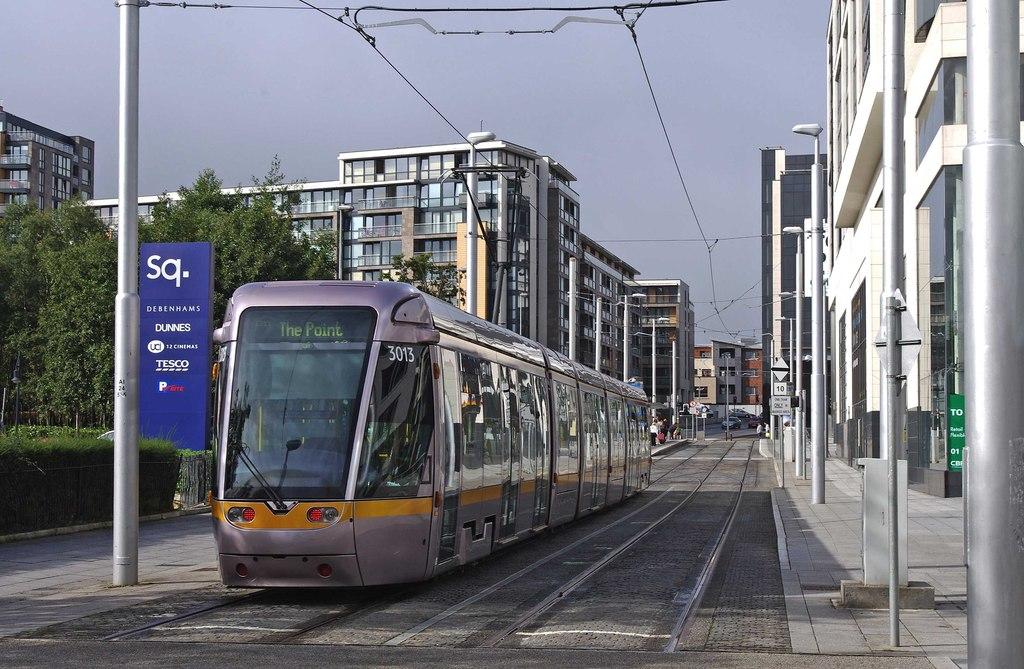
Central Tallaght in South Dublin

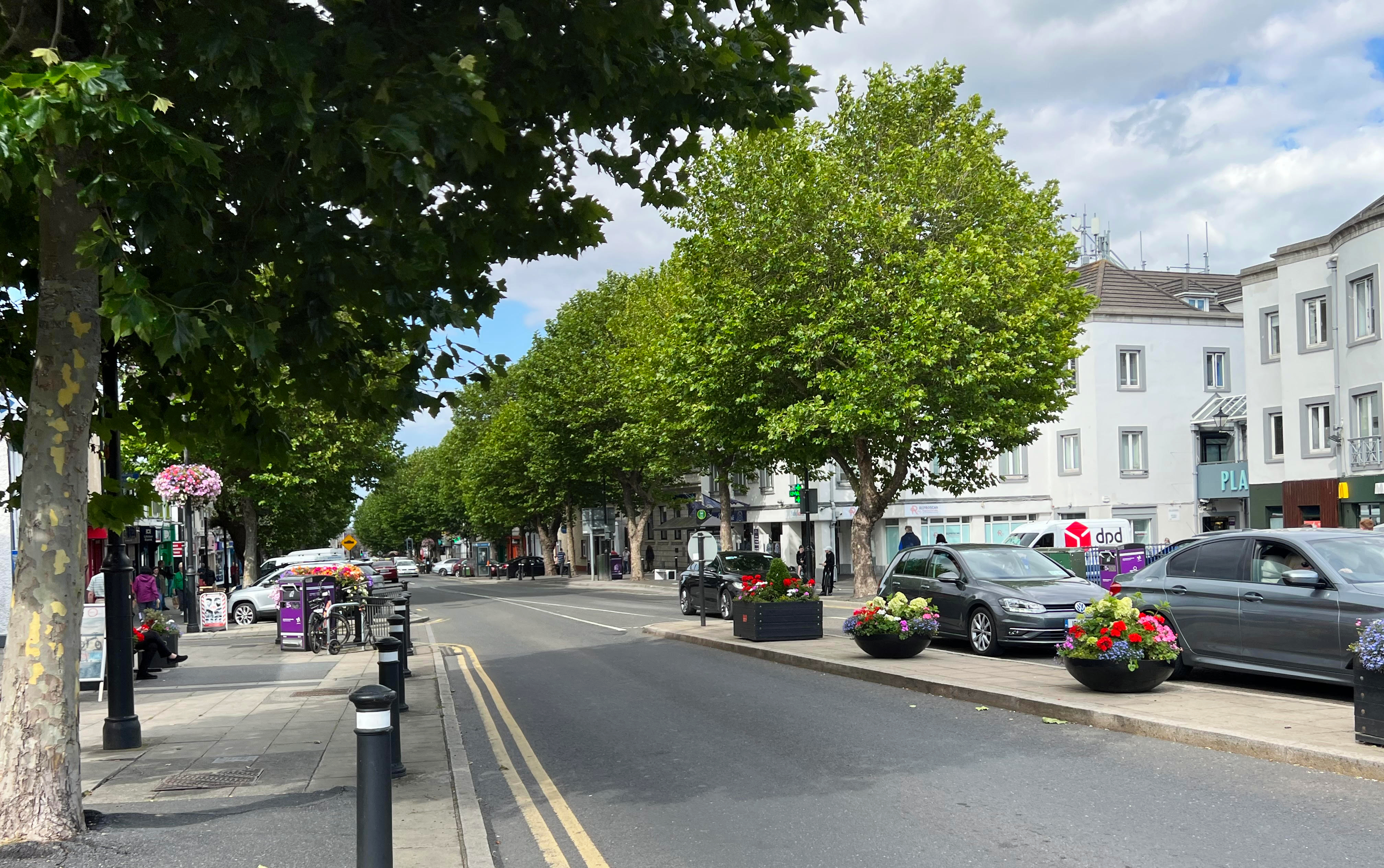
Main Street in Swords, County Dublin

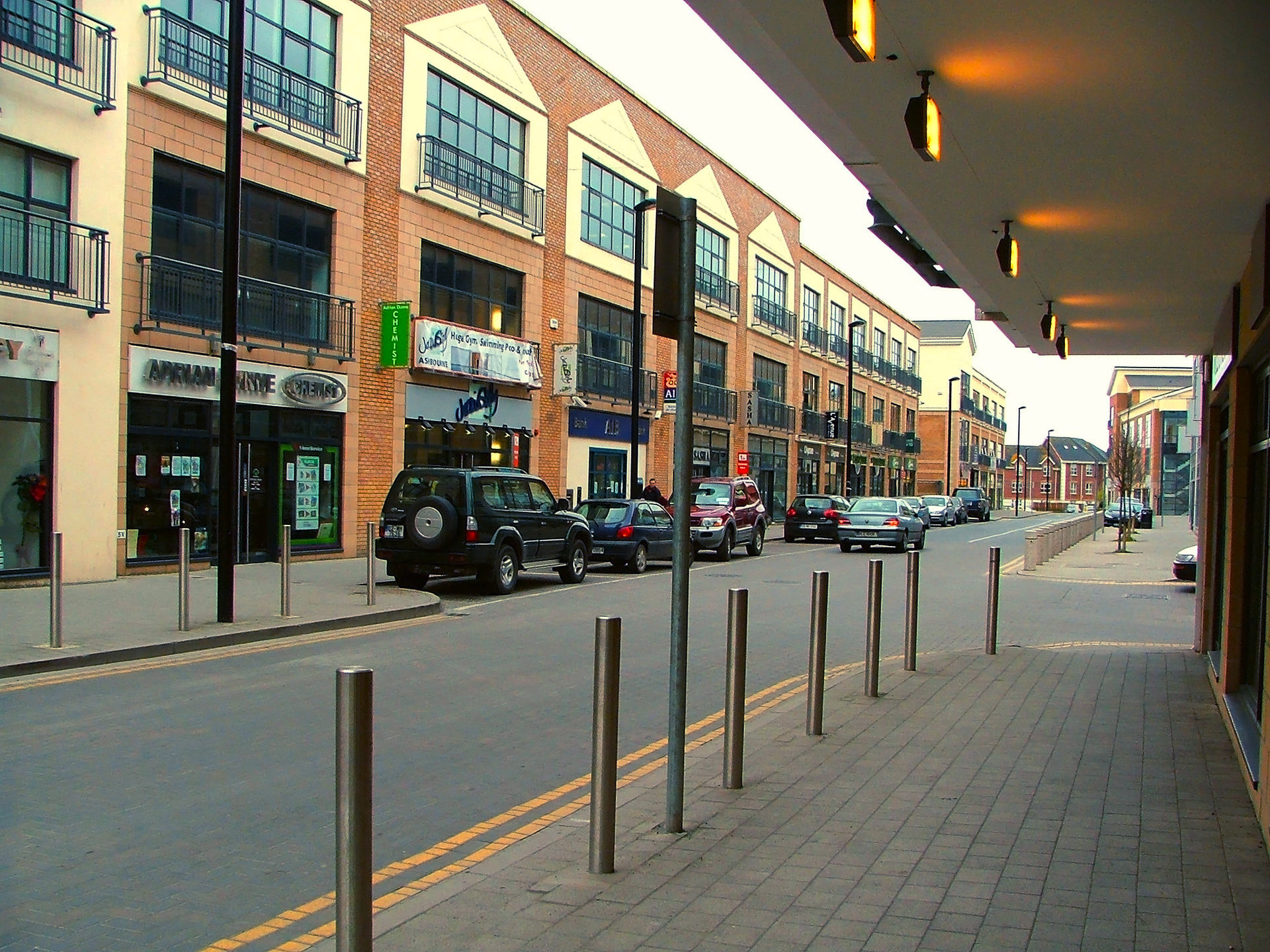
Killegland Street in Ashbourne, County Meath

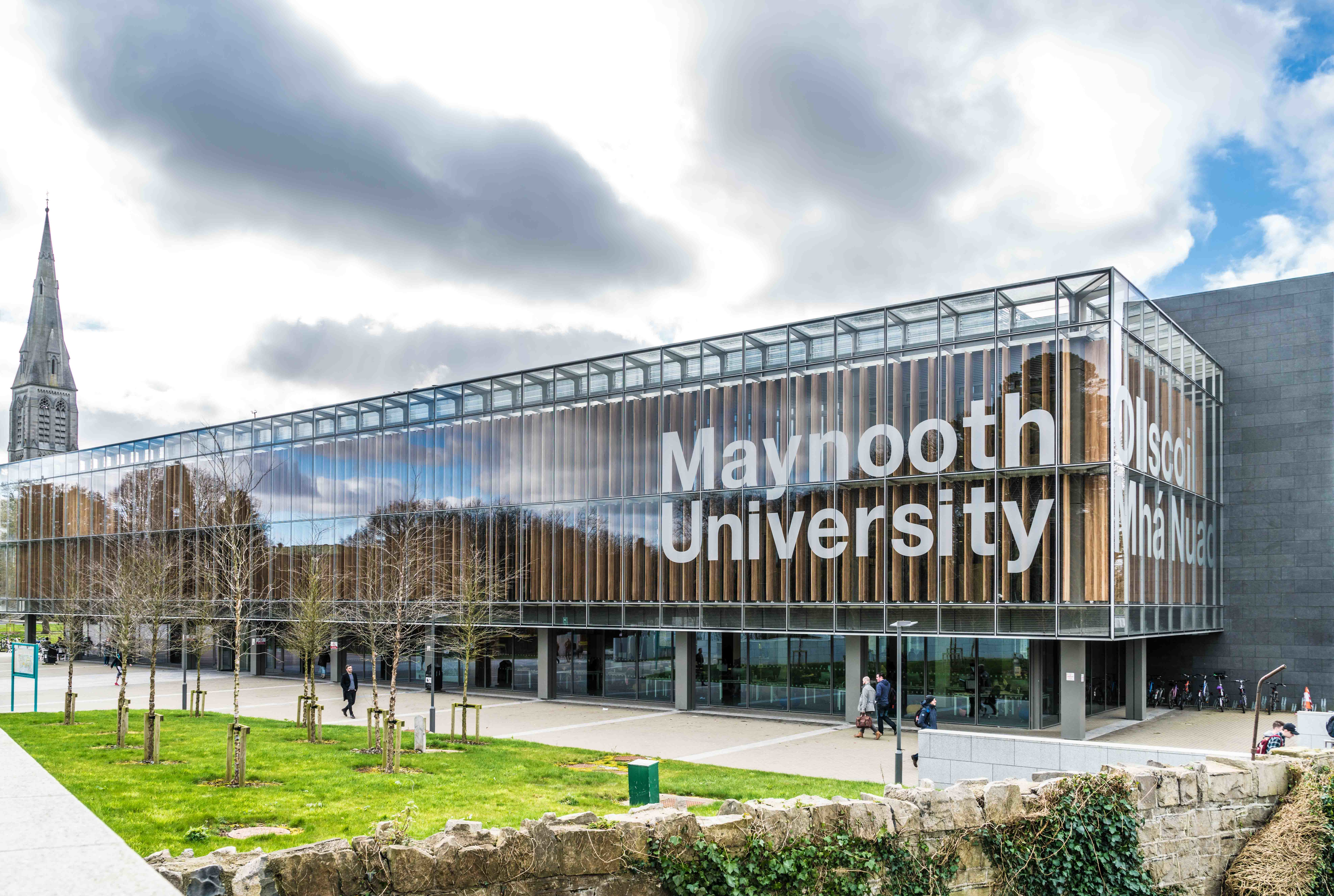
National University of Ireland at Maynooth, County Kildare

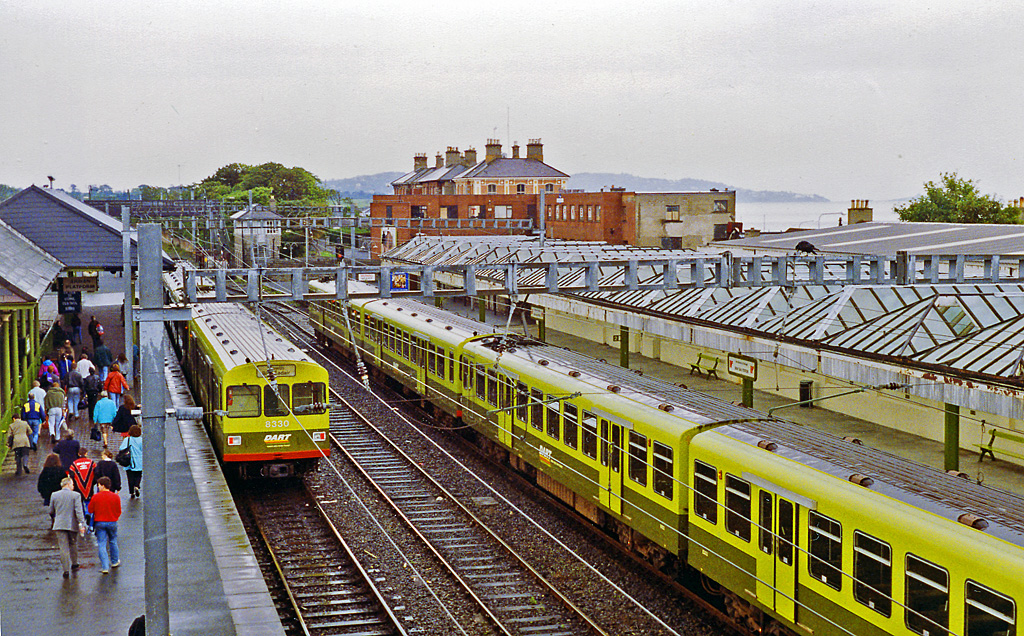
Bray Daly railway station in Bray, County Wicklow

== See also ==
- Belfast metropolitan area
- Derry Urban Area
- List of metropolitan areas in Europe
