= National Transport Authority (Ireland) =

Public transport licensing agency in Ireland

- Údarás Náisiúnta Iompair
- Logo of the National Transport Authority

- Transport for Ireland is the public-facing brand of the NTA

Agency overview
- Formed: 1 December 2009
- Preceding agency: Dublin Transportation Office
- Type: Statutory non-commercial body
- Jurisdiction: Ireland
- Headquarters: Haymarket House, Smithfield, Dublin 7; 53.34731°N 6.27880°W
- Minister responsible: Darragh O'Brien, Minister for Transport
- Agency executives: Anne Shaw, CEO Designate; Hugh Creegan, Interim CEO; Peter Strachan, Chairperson
- Parent department: Department of Transport
- Key documents: Dublin Transport Authority Act, 2008; Public Transport Regulation Act, 2009
- Website: NTA website

The National Transport Authority (Irish: Údarás Náisiúnta Iompair) or NTA, publicly operating as Transport for Ireland, is the transport operating authority for Greater Dublin and the public transport licensing agency for Ireland. It was established under the provisions of the Dublin Transport Authority Act (2008) and the Public Transport Regulation Act (2009), on 1 December 2009.

The NTA took over certain functions from the Department of Transport and the entire role of the Dublin Transportation Office. It has also taken over the functions of the Commission for Taxi Regulation when Part 4 of the Public Transport Regulation Act (2009) commenced on 1 January 2011.

== Organisation ==
The act establishing the NTA made it a body corporate consisting of the City Manager of Dublin City Council, the Chief Executive and a member of the senior management team, and a chairman and six other members appointed by the Minister for Transport. The NTA has charge of public transport in the Greater Dublin Area, which is defined legally for the first time in the Act. The counties covered are the City of Dublin, Dún Laoghaire–Rathdown, South Dublin, Fingal, County Wicklow, County Kildare, and County Meath. An advisory council, consisting of local government officials and councillors, representatives of the Garda Síochána, the Irish Congress of Trade Unions and business and community interests, was also established. The Public Transport Regulation Act retains this structure, though it provides that its functional area in respect of the additional functions that it is granted under that Bill its functional area is the entire state.

The NTA subsumed the activities of the former Dublin Transportation Office, which was dissolved on 1 December 2009.

On 12th September 2025, NTA Chairperson Peter Strachan announced the appointment of Anne Shaw as Chief Executive Officer of the NTA, commencing her term in November 2025.

== Activities and services ==
The National Transport Authority (NTA) is in charge of most public transport within Greater Dublin. Unlike authorities such as Transport for London and RATP, it does not normally operate services itself, although there is provision for it to do so in certain circumstances. It operates public service obligation contracts with transport operators, including Córas Iompair Éireann, Transport Infrastructure Ireland and private operators.

It was originally intended that the Railway Procurement Agency would, like the Dublin Transportation Office, be subsumed into the NTA, but a lobbying campaign by the agency led to it retaining its separate status. The CIÉ companies (Dublin Bus, Iarnród Éireann and Bus Éireann) have retained their existing services, but they are now subject to directions from the NTA within Greater Dublin.

In 2011, the NTA oversaw the development of the TFI Leap Card scheme which introduced integrated ticketing in the Greater Dublin Area.

During 2012 and 2013, a rebranding of services took place on taxis all over Ireland, and on some of the fleet in both Dublin Bus and Bus Éireann, using the new name Transport for Ireland. This continued over several coming years.

In December 2013, the NTA announced that around 10% of routes then operated by Dublin Bus and Bus Éireann under their direct award contracts would be subject to competitive tendering, with a view to services commencing in 2016. Also in late 2013, the NTA published a plan for a cycle network in Greater Dublin, with greenways, cycleways and cycle paths which would potentially make the city and its surrounds accessible by bicycle – the Greater Dublin Area Cycle Network. The cycle network plan has not been implemented and, as of 2021, the NTA noted that the organisation was then "in the process of updating the GDA Cycle Network Plan" and that it planned to publish this update "later in 2021".

As of 2022, the NTA had partially implemented an infrastructure program, titled BusConnects, with a focus on the bus networks in several cities in Ireland. Described by the NTA as intended to "improve bus services across the country", by mid-2022 the BusConnects program was in "implementation" phase in Dublin, "consultation" phase in Cork, with the Minister for Transport projecting similar initiatives in Galway, Limerick and Waterford.

== Establishment timeline ==
The name of the body, under the Dublin Transport Authority Act 2008, was originally to be "Dublin Transport Authority". However, in the budget announced in October 2008, the Irish government announced a major review of public service bodies, with bodies being amalgamated where it was felt savings could be made. A separate national transport regulator was originally intended to be set up to license public transport, but an annex to 2009 budget revealed that the government intended to incorporate both this body and the Commission for Taxi Regulation into the DTA. In an interview in The Irish Times on 14 January 2009, the Minister for Transport at the time, Noel Dempsey, confirmed this would be the case.

In January 2009, the Public Appointments Service advertised the position of chief executive officer of the DTA. The advertisement noted the government's intention to "assign national responsibility to the DTA for bus market regulation and the procurement of public transport services under public service obligations" and for the DTA to take over the duties of the Commission for Taxi Regulation.

In September 2009, former Dublin city manager John Fitzgerald was appointed chairman designate of the NTA, with Gerry Murphy appointed chief executive designate.

Also in September 2009, the Public Transport Regulation Bill (2009) was published. This gave it responsibility for licensing road passenger transport services throughout the state. It also provided for the abolition of the Taxi Regulator and the transfer of its functions to the renamed National Transport Authority. This is in addition to its Dublin-specific functions granted under the DTA Act, which it retained.

In October 2009, the Minister announced that the Commission for Aviation Regulation would be merged with the new authority, with certain functions of the Irish Aviation Authority also to be transferred. However, neither of these proposals actually made it into the Public Transport Regulation Act 2009, which was promulgated on 27 November 2009.

The Public Transport Regulation Act (2009) proposed to change the name of the organisation to the National Transport Authority, and this was done with effect from the establishment day of the Authority under the Public Transport Regulation Act 2009 (National Transport Authority) (Appointed Day) Order 2009.
