= Mark Page (engineer) =

American aerospace engineer

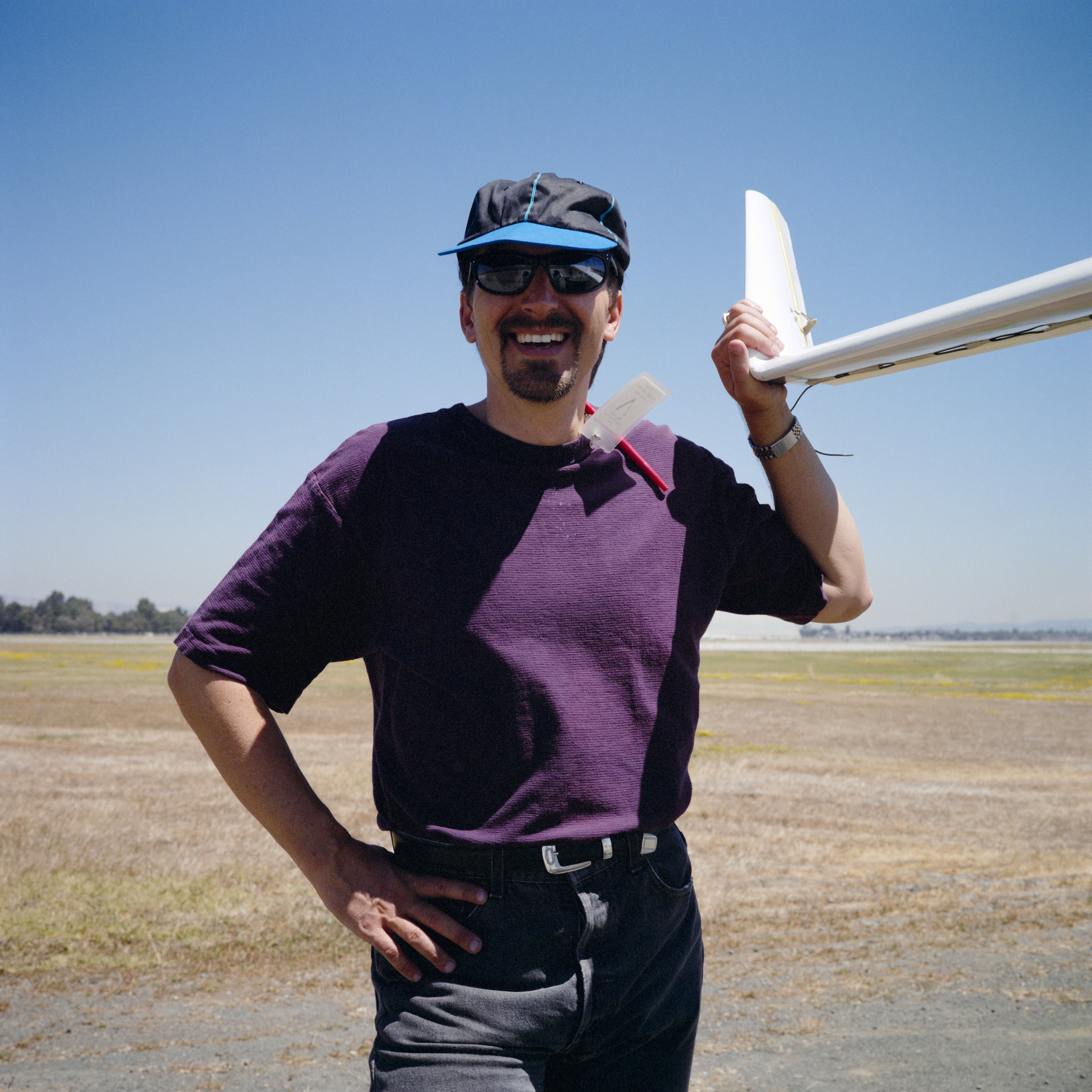
- Mark Page standing next to the NASA/McDonnell Douglas BWB-17 research model
- Occupations: Aerospace engineer and Aerodynamicist

Mark Page (born 1956) is an American aerodynamicist and aerospace engineer. He is most known for his contributions to the design of UAVs and blended wing body (BWB) aircraft. He is currently the co-founder and Chief Technology Officer (CTO) at JetZero.

== Career ==
Page started his career in 1980 as an aerospace engineer for McDonnell Douglas. There he first worked on the MDF-100 and MD-XX programs, and as head of Stability and Control on the MD-91, 92, and 94 propfan programs. Following this, he worked as chief aerodynamicist on the McDonnell Douglas MD-90. Then, after moving into the Research group, Page headed Stability and Control for NASA R&D programs including the F-16XL Laminar Flow Control testbed, High Speed Civil Transport (HSCT) and Oblique Flying-Wing (OFW) programs. In his last three years at the company, Mark was technical program manager on the NASA/McDonnell Douglas BWB program where he developed the modern BWB configuration with Robert H. Liebeck and Blaine Rawdon.

From 1997 to 2000, Page worked with All American Racers in their aerodynamics department working on AAR's Champ Car program, eventually becoming their aerodynamics lead. Here he designed the aerodynamics for AAR's Eagle 987 and 997 Champ Cars.

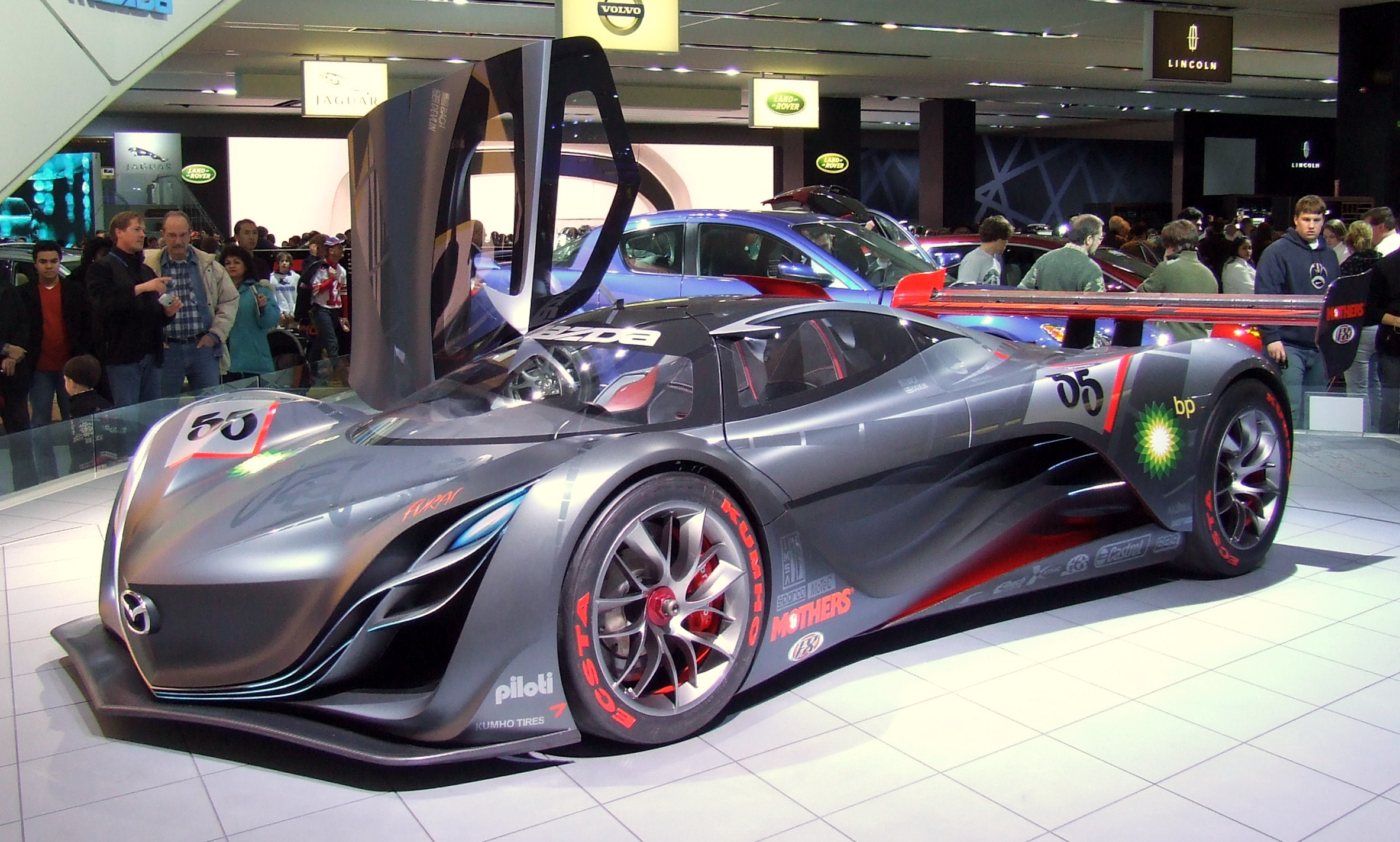
While at Swift Engineering, Page worked on the aerodynamics for the Mazda Furai

From 2006 to 2012, Page served as chief scientist at Swift Engineering, developing designs for both their racecars and aircraft. In their racing department, he worked on the aero-shell design of Swift's racecars, including the Formula Atlantic Swift 014.a, Formula Atlantic Swift 016.a, Formula Nippon Swift 017.n, and their 2012 IndyCar proposal. Page also designed the bodies for Gary Scelzi's Toyota Celica Funny Car that raced in NHRA, and Toyota's 2004 Tundra race truck for the NASCAR Craftsman Truck Series. In addition to series racecars, Page also worked on the aerodynamics for the Mazda Furai concept car. In their aircraft department, Page designed the Swift Killer Bee UAV, the rights to which would later be purchased by Northrop Grumman and renamed the Bat, as well as designed the Eclipse Concept Jet in partnership with Eclipse Aviation.

In 2012, after leaving Swift, Page co-founded DZYNE Technologies, where he served as vice president and chief scientist until 2022. Here he worked on a number of projects, including designing the aerodynamics for the Beta Alia, designing the Ascent 1000, a concept blended wing body jetliner, designing the Rotorwing, an electric whole wing VTOL UAV, and designing the all-composite diesel Mooney M10T trainer aircraft.

In 2020, Page co-founded California based aerospace company JetZero, where he currently serves as Chief Technology Officer (CTO).

== Designs ==
BWB program

From 1994 to 1997, Mark was technical program manager on the seminal NASA/McDonnell Douglas BWB program that developed the modern blended wing body configuration used today. This program culminated in the BWB-17, an artificially stabilized 17-foot (5.2 m) model (6% scale) built by Stanford University, which was flown in 1997 and showed good handling qualities. The BWB-17 was the direct precursor to the NASA X-48B and X-48C programs that further validated BWB design.

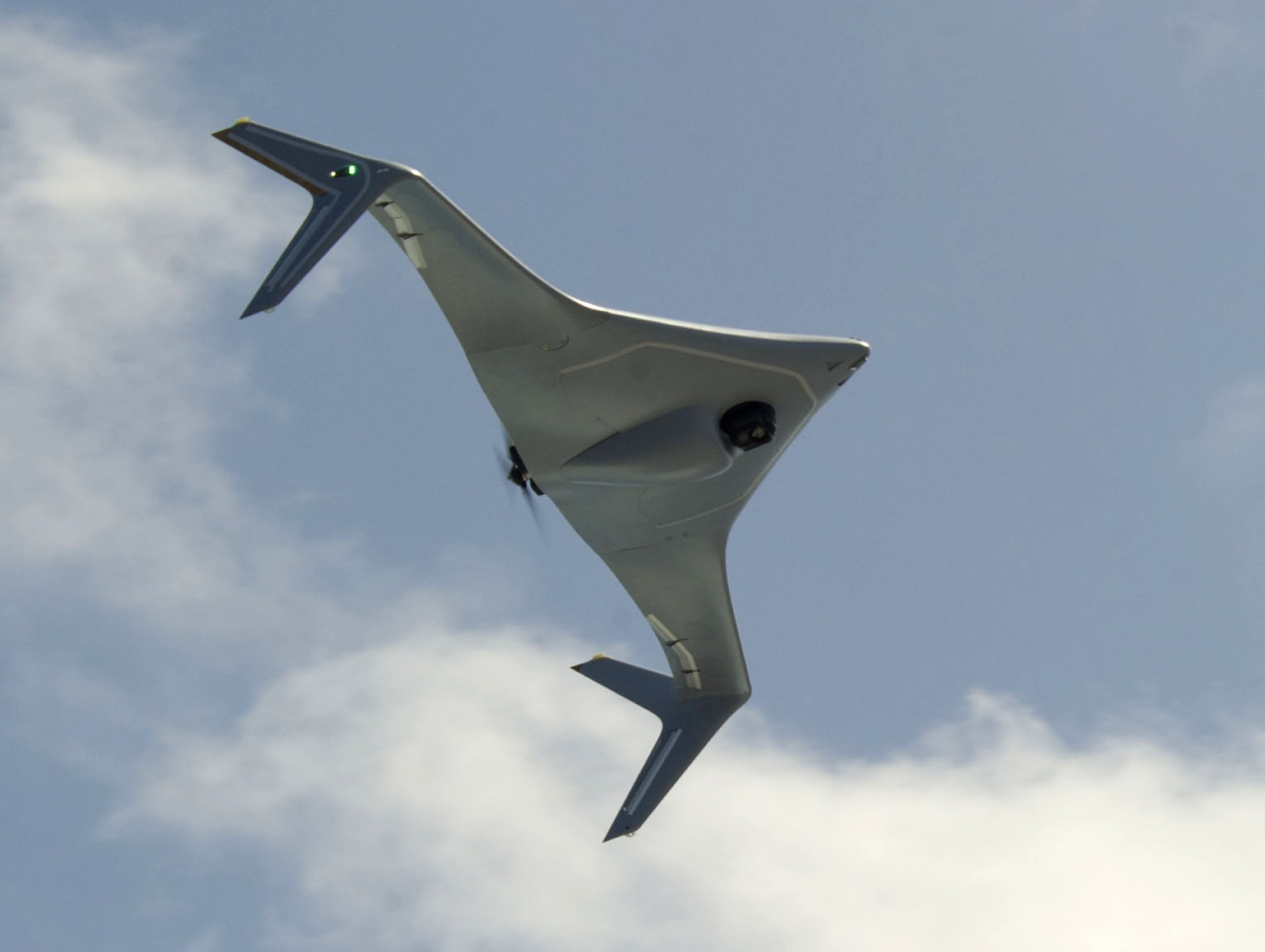
Northrop Grumman Bat in flight

Swift Killer Bee

At Swift Engineering, Page designed the Swift Killer Bee, a medium-altitude unmanned air vehicle (UAV) designed primarily as an intelligence "ISR" gathering tool. Drawing on his previous experience designing blended wing body aircraft, the Killer Bee utilized blended wings that merged with the fuselage into a single airfoil to reduce aerodynamic drag, improve fuel economy and increase flight endurance. Swift claims this was the first UAV to utilize a blended wing design. In April, 2009, the design and marketing rights to the Killer Bee were bought by Northrop Grumman and the project was renamed to the Northrop Grumman Bat.

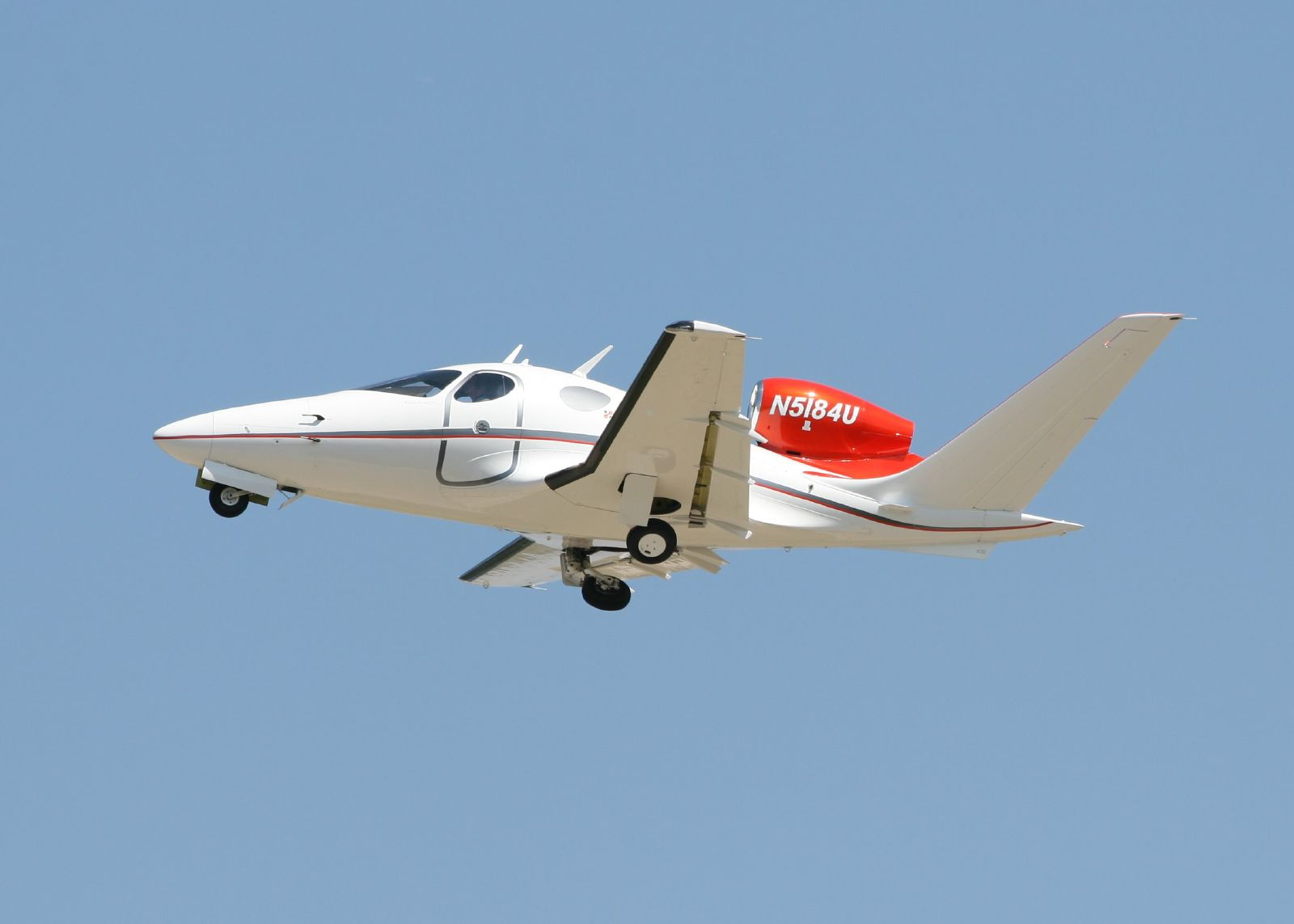
Eclipse 400 at the 2007 EAA Oshkosh Airshow

Eclipse Concept Jet

At Swift Engineering, in partnership with Eclipse Aviation, Page designed the Eclipse Concept Jet, a single engine concept jet intended to be a smaller 4 passenger offering to slot in below their existing 6 passenger Eclipse 500 jet. The jet was designed and built in secrecy in only 200 days, making its first public debut at AirVenture in 2007, where it flew into the show. The Concept Jet was later renamed to the Eclipse 400, but the project was cancelled in 2008 after Eclipse declared bankruptcy, with only one prototype having been built.

Ascent 1000

At DZYNE, Page designed the Ascent 1000, a concept jetliner with a blended wing body design, intended to be a vision for the next generation of business jets and commercial airliners. The jet uses a single deck design with pivoting landing gear and the ability to hold between 120 and 200 passengers depending on configuration. DZYNE claims the blended wing designs delivers a 50% reduction in fuel consumption versus comparable tube-and-wing airliners, a reduction in noise, and triple the cabin floor space versus competitors in the business jet variant.

Rotorwing UAV

At DZYNE, Page designed the Rotorwing, an electric VTOL whole wing UAV. The UAV can transition between using its wing as a rotor for VTOL and as a fixed wing for forward flight. This design aimed to combine the benefits of a traditional plane's endurance with the versatility added by VTOL, while also allowing the Rotorwing to be used without a catapult, net, or runway for launch and recovery like many other UAV designs require.
