= Gurney flap =

Tab on the trailing edge of a wing

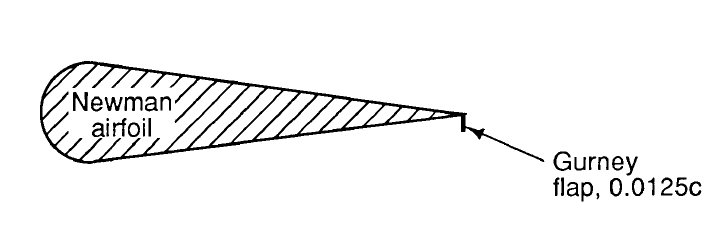
A Gurney flap shown on the underside of a Newman airfoil

The Gurney flap (or wickerbill) is a small tab projecting from the trailing edge of a wing. Typically it is set at a right angle to the pressure-side surface of the airfoil and projects 1% to 2% of the wing chord. This trailing edge device can improve the performance of a simple airfoil to nearly the same level as a complex high-performance design.

The device operates by increasing pressure on the pressure side, decreasing pressure on the suction side, and helping the boundary layer flow stay attached all the way to the trailing edge on the suction side of the airfoil. Common applications occur in auto racing, helicopter horizontal stabilizers, and aircraft where high lift is essential, such as banner-towing airplanes.

It is named for its inventor and developer, American race car driver Dan Gurney.

== History ==
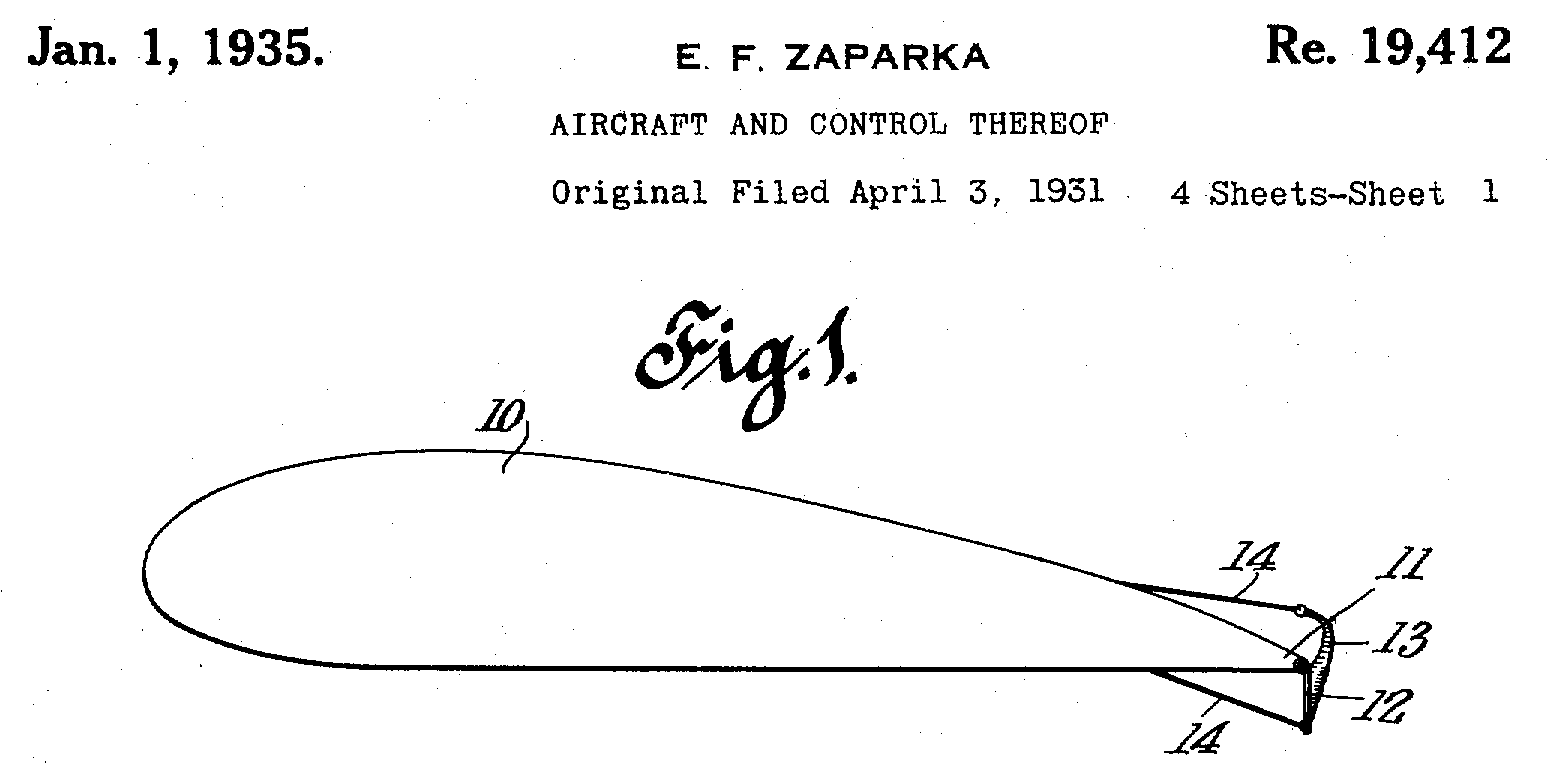
The "variable-lift airfoil" shown in Figure 1 of the 1935 E. F. Zaparka patent U.S. patent RE19412. It is a movable microflap, similar to the fixed Gurney flap.

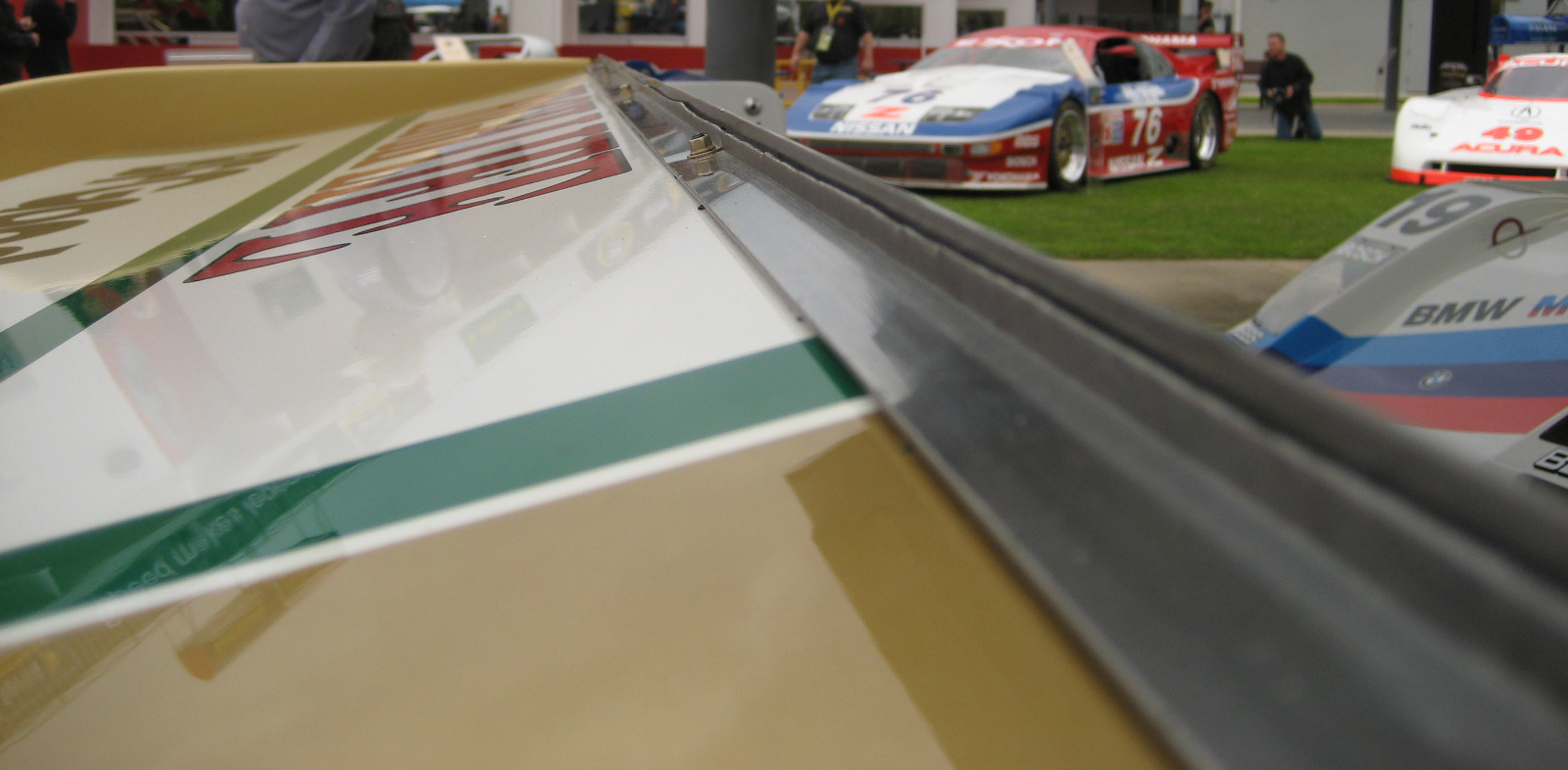
A Gurney flap on the trailing edge of the rear wing of a Porsche 962

The original application, pioneered by American automobile racing icon Dan Gurney (who was challenged to do so by fellow American racer Bobby Unser), was a right-angle piece of sheet metal, rigidly fixed to the top trailing edge of the rear wing on his open-wheel racing cars of the early 1970s. The device was installed pointing upward to increase downforce generated by the wing, improving traction. He field-tested it and found that it allowed a car to negotiate turns at higher speed, while also achieving higher speed in the straight sections of the track.

The first application of the flap was in 1971, after Gurney retired from driving and began managing his own racing team full-time. His driver Bobby Unser had been testing a new Len Terry early CAD/CAM designed car at Phoenix International Raceway and was unhappy with the car's performance on the track. Gurney needed to do something to restore his driver's confidence before the race and recalled experiments conducted in the 1950s by certain racing teams with spoilers affixed to the rear of the bodywork to cancel lift (at that level of development, the spoilers were not thought of as potential performance enhancers, merely devices to cancel out destabilizing and potentially deadly aerodynamic lift). Gurney decided to try adding a "spoiler" to the top trailing edge of the rear wing. The device was fabricated and fitted in under an hour, but Unser's test laps with the modified wing turned in equally poor times. When Unser was able to speak to Gurney in confidence, he disclosed that the lap times with the new wing were slowed because it was now producing so much downforce that the car was understeering. All that was needed was to balance this by adding downforce in front.

Unser realized the value of this breakthrough immediately and wanted to conceal it from the competition, including his brother Al. Not wanting to call attention to the devices, Gurney left them out in the open. To conceal his true intent, Gurney deceived inquisitive competitors by telling them the blunted trailing edge was intended to prevent injury and damage when pushing the car by hand. Some copied the design and some of them even attempted to improve upon it by pointing the flap downward, which actually hurt performance.

Gurney was able to use the device in racing for several years before its true purpose became known. Later, he discussed his ideas with aerodynamicist and wing designer Bob Liebeck of Douglas Aircraft Company. Liebeck tested the device, which he later named the "Gurney flap" and confirmed Gurney's field test results using a 1.25% chord flap on a Newman symmetric airfoil. His 1976 AIAA paper (76-406) "On the design of subsonic airfoils for high lift" introduced the concept to the aerodynamics community.

Gurney assigned his patent rights to Douglas Aircraft, but the device was not patentable, since it was substantially similar to a movable microflap patented by E. F. Zaparka in 1931, ten days before Gurney was born. Similar devices were also tested by Gruschwitz and Schrenk and presented in Berlin in 1932.

== Theory of operation ==
The Gurney flap increases the maximum lift coefficient (C_{L,max}), decreases the angle of attack for zero lift (α_{0}), and increases the nosedown pitching moment (C_{M}), which is consistent with an increase in camber of the airfoil. It also typically increases the drag coefficient (C_{d}), especially at low angles of attack, although for thick airfoils, a reduction in drag has been reported. A net benefit in overall lift-to-drag ratio is possible if the flap is sized appropriately, based on the boundary layer thickness.

The Gurney flap increases lift by altering the Kutta condition at the trailing edge. The wake behind the flap is a pair of counter-rotating vortices that are alternately shed in a von Kármán vortex street. In addition to these spanwise vortices shed behind the flap, chordwise vortices shed from in front of the flap become important at high angles of attack.

The increased pressure on the lower surface ahead of the flap means the upper surface suction can be reduced while producing the same lift.

== Helicopter applications ==
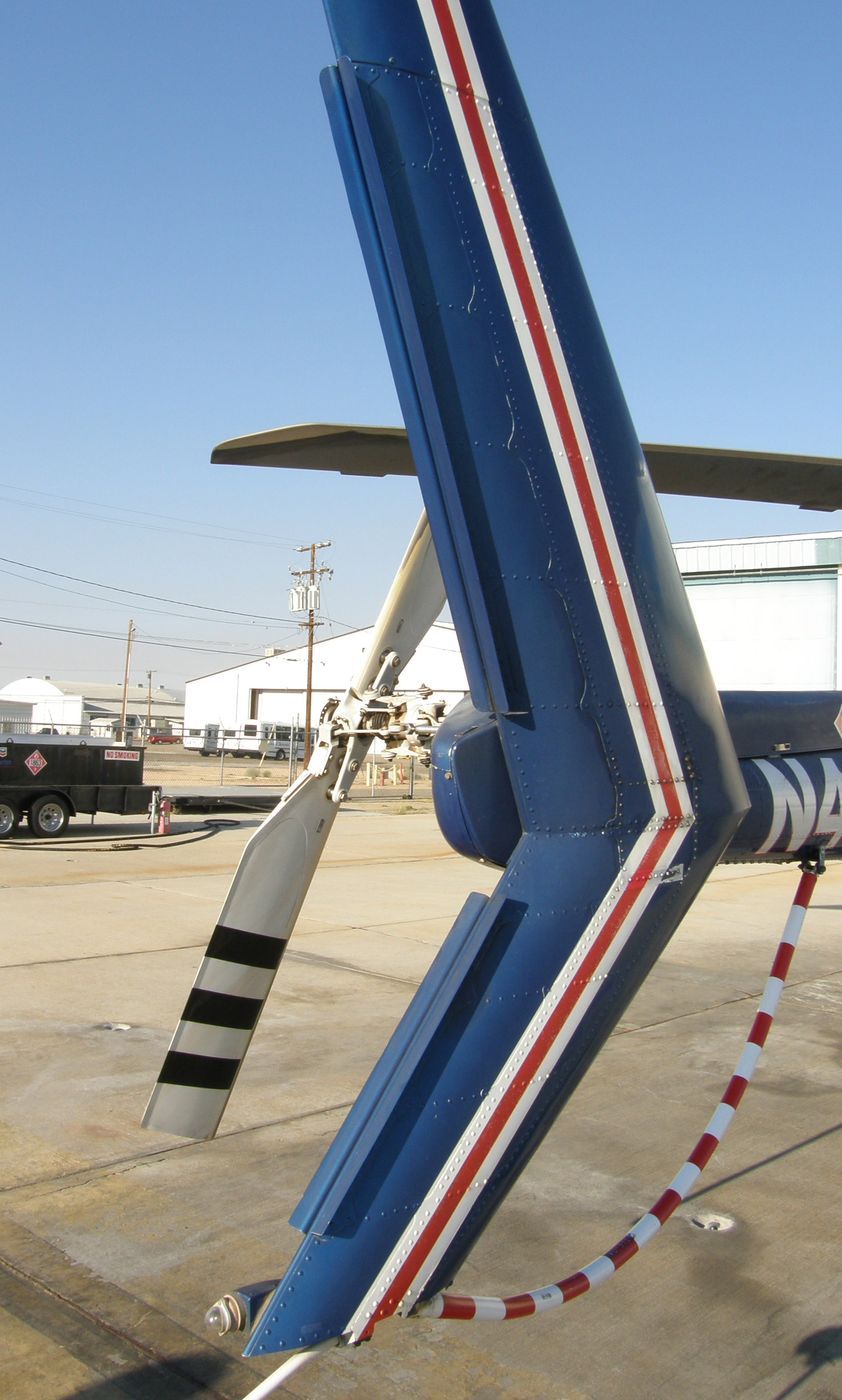
Double Gurney flaps on a Bell 222U helicopter

Gurney flaps have found wide application on helicopter horizontal stabilizers, because they operate over a very wide range of both positive and negative angles of attack. At one extreme, in a high-powered climb, the negative angle of attack of the horizontal stabilizer can be as high as −25°; at the other extreme, in autorotation, it may be +15°. As a result, at least half of all modern helicopters built in the West have them in one form or another.

The Gurney flap was first applied to the Sikorsky S-76B variant, when flight testing revealed the horizontal stabilizer from the original S-76 not providing sufficient lift. Engineers fitted a Gurney flap to the NACA 2412 inverted airfoil to resolve the problem without redesigning the stabilizer from scratch. A Gurney flap was also fitted to the Bell JetRanger to correct an angle of incidence problem in the design that was too difficult to correct directly.

The Eurocopter AS355 TwinStar helicopter uses a double Gurney flap that projects from both surfaces of the vertical stabilizer. This is used to correct a problem with lift reversal in thick airfoil sections at low angles of attack. The double Gurney flap reduces the control input required to make the transition from hover to forward flight.

== See also ==
- Lift (force)
