= Spoiler (car) =

Device for reducing aerodynamic drag

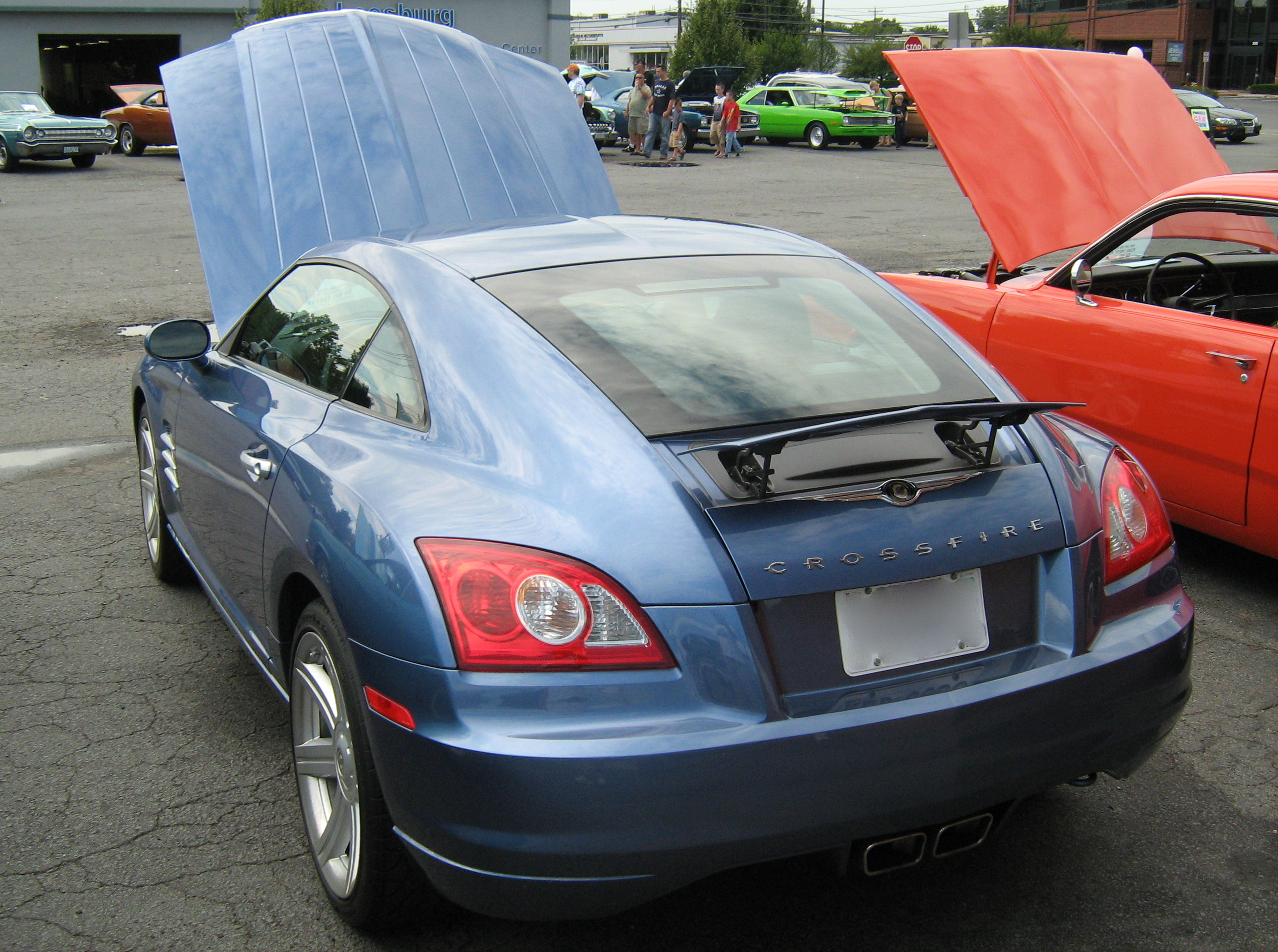
Retractable spoiler on a Chrysler Crossfire

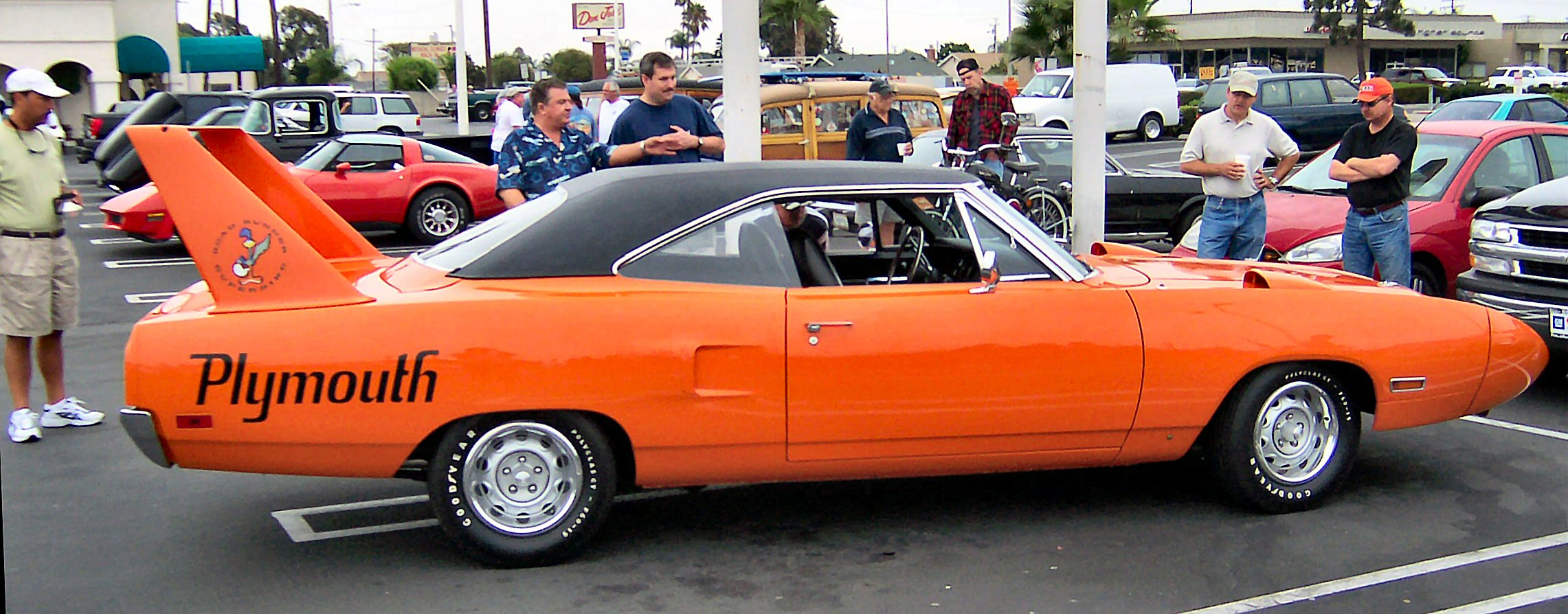
The Plymouth Superbird is famous for its high factory rear wing

A spoiler is an automotive aerodynamic device whose intended design function is to 'spoil' unfavorable air movement across the body of a vehicle in motion, usually manifested as lift, turbulence, or drag. Spoilers on the front of a vehicle are often called air dams and are positioned below the front of the vehicle.

Spoilers are frequently fitted to race and high-performance sports cars, although they have also become common on passenger vehicles. Spoilers are added to cars primarily for styling and either have little aerodynamic benefit or worsen the aerodynamics.

The term "spoiler" is often mistakenly used interchangeably with "wing". An automotive wing is designed to generate downforce as air passes around it, not simply to disrupt existing airflow patterns. Rather than decreasing drag, automotive wings actually increase drag.

== Operation ==
Aerodynamics plays a critical role in a car's behavior at high speeds. Vehicles must be stable and balanced first at lower speeds through their mechanical grip on the road via the chassis, suspension, and tires. Aerodynamic aids can then be used to provide the necessary balance and stability characteristics at higher speeds. Spoilers and wings on a vehicle have little effect at low speeds as improper designs may create undesirable responses and lower stability or efficiency for the car at high speeds.

Since "spoiler" is a term describing an application, the operation of a spoiler varies depending on the particular effect it is trying to spoil. Standard spoiler functions include disrupting airflow passing over and around a moving vehicle. A standard spoiler diffuses air by increasing turbulence flowing over the shape, "spoiling" the laminar flow and providing a cushion for the laminar boundary layer. However, other types of airflow may require the spoiler to operate differently and take on vastly different physical characteristics.

== In racing cars ==
While a mass travels at increasing speeds, the environment's air affects its movement. Spoilers in racing are combined with other features on the body or chassis of race cars to change the handling characteristics affected by the environment's air. Race tracks demand specific aerodynamic configurations due to the varying speeds and track layouts. Configurations and devices may also be tailored to suit the talents of a particular driver, with the overall goal of reaching faster times.

A car's performance is susceptible to the aerodynamic forces acting upon it because both drag and downforce increase proportionally by the square of velocity. This relationship has implications for vehicle setup. At speeds below about 120 mph (190 km/h), aerodynamics plays a role, though the emphasis shifts.

- On short oval track racing, maximizing downforce is crucial for enhancing grip and enabling higher cornering speeds. However, excessive drag can severely hinder acceleration out of corners and top speed on the straights. Teams often use relatively large rear wings and front splitters, but must balance downforce and drag.
- Road racing courses present a mix of high-speed straights, tight corners, and elevation changes. Aerodynamic setups must balance downforce for cornering and minimizing drag for straight-line speed. Teams often employ adjustable aerodynamic elements, like wings and flaps, to fine-tune the car's behavior for different track sections.
- In contrast, at speeds higher than 120 mph (190 km/h), such as those seen on superspeedways, even small changes in aerodynamic configuration can dramatically impact handling and performance.

== Passenger vehicles ==
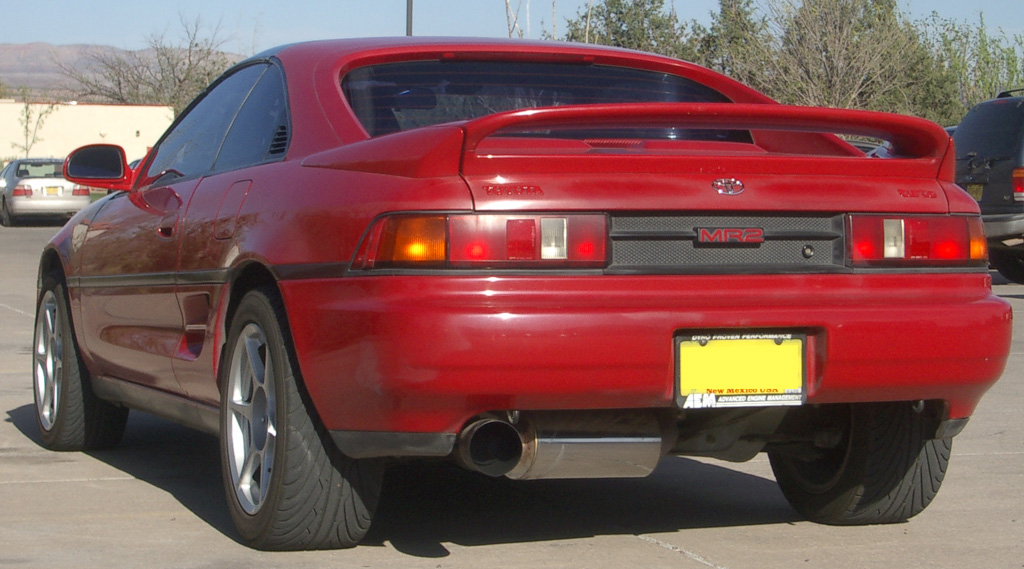
Toyota MR2 with a factory-installed rear spoiler

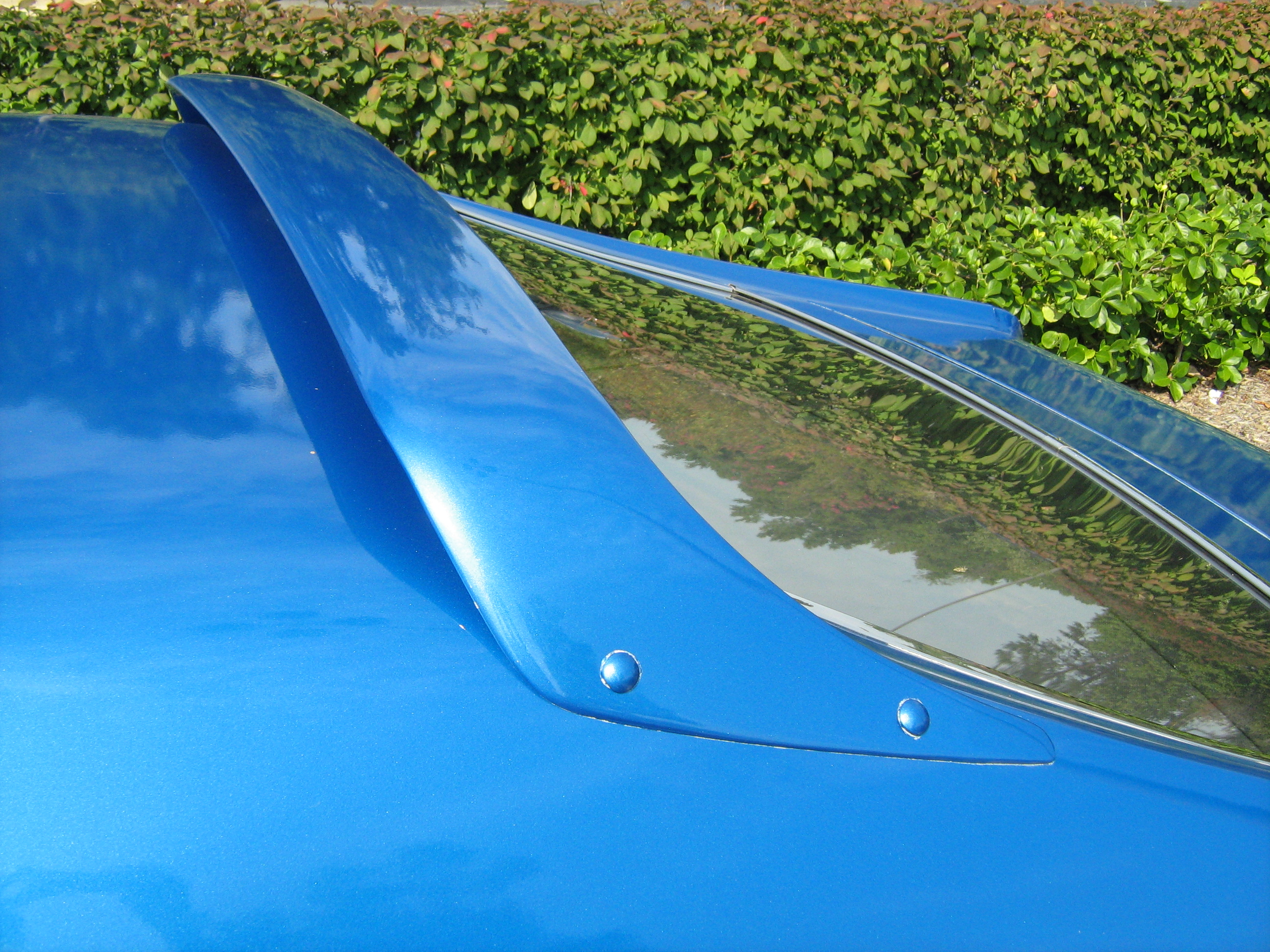
Optional "Breedlove" airfoil roof spoiler on a 1969 AMC Javelin

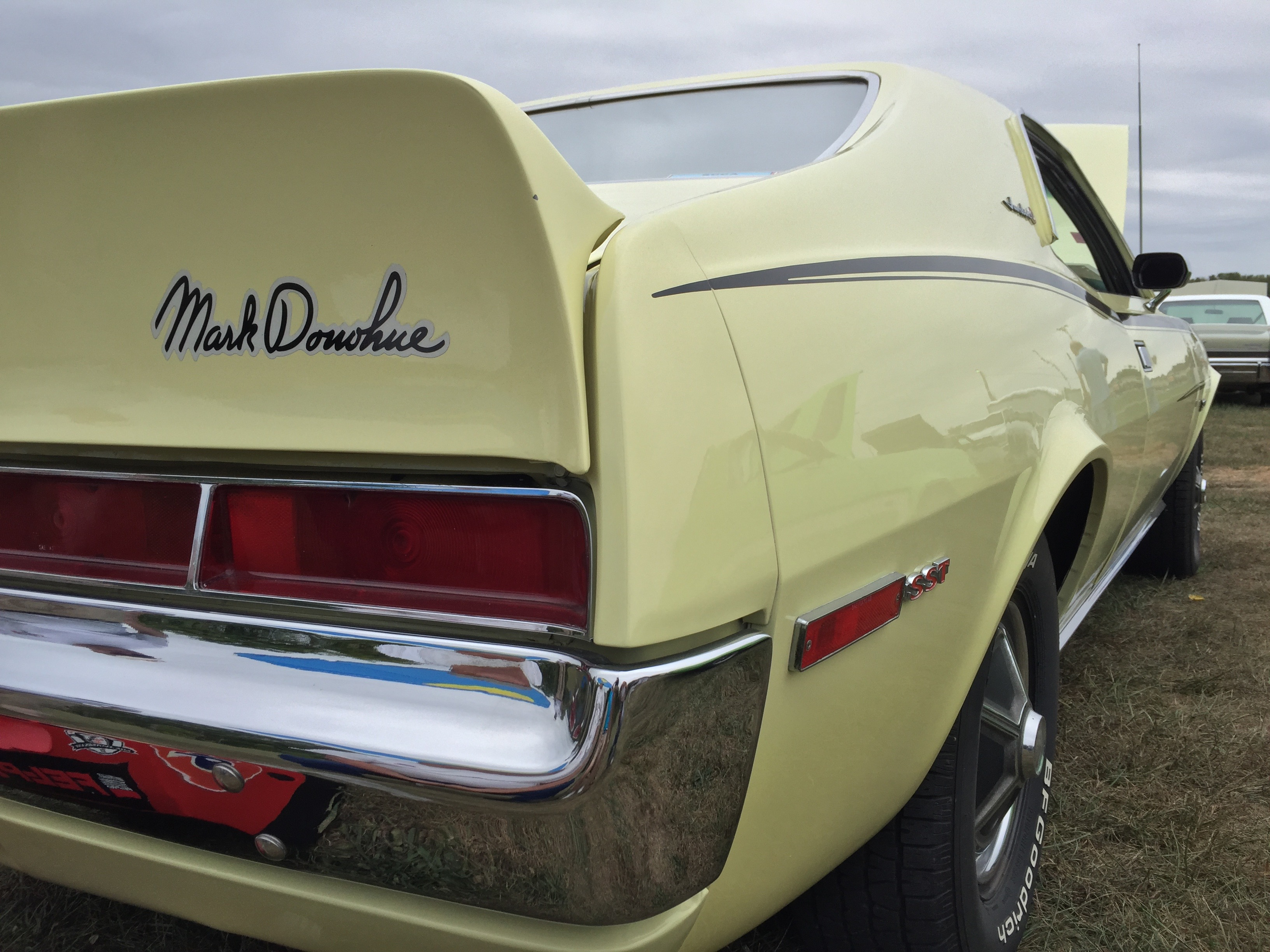
"Mark Donohue" ducktail rear spoiler on a 1970 AMC Javelin

The goal of many spoilers used in passenger vehicles is to reduce drag and increase fuel efficiency. Passenger vehicles can be equipped with front and rear spoilers. Front spoilers, found beneath the bumper, are mainly used to decrease the air underneath the vehicle to reduce the drag coefficient and lift.

Sports cars are most commonly seen with front and rear spoilers. Even though these vehicles typically have a more rigid chassis and a stiffer suspension to aid in high-speed maneuverability, a spoiler can still be beneficial. This is because many cars have a relatively steep downward angle going from the rear edge of the roof down to the vehicle's trunk or tail, which may cause airflow separation. The airflow becomes turbulent, creating a low-pressure zone, increasing drag and instability (see Bernoulli effect). Adding a rear spoiler could be considered to make the air "see" a more extended, gentler slope from the roof to the spoiler, which helps to delay flow separation, and the higher pressure in front of the spoiler can help reduce the lift on the car by creating downforce. This may reduce drag in certain instances and generally increase high-speed stability due to the reduced rear lift.

Due to their association with racing, spoilers are often viewed as "sporty" by consumers. In 1968, Craig Breedlove set a flying mile record of 161.7335 miles per hour (260.28 km/h) at the Bonneville Salt Flats with a prepared production 304 cu in (5.0 L) V8 AMC Javelin featuring Breedlove's unique roof-mounted spoiler. Stylists at AMC later made a streamlined fiberglass airfoil above the rear window that became a factory option on the 1969 Javelins. Testing by Car Life magazine indicated no improvement in reducing lift at speeds below 115 mph (185 km/h). This feature was replaced and homologated in 1970 by AMC with a trunk lid-mounted oversized ducktail spoiler designed by Mark Donohue and Roger Penske. This race-proven feature became standard equipment on every 1971 through 1974 AMC Javelin AMX model.

However, "the spoilers that feature on more upmarket models rarely provide further aerodynamic benefit." The vast majority of the designs do not do anything, except the factory units on competition and high-end sports cars, while some manufacturers disclose that their "spoilers are for looks only". Moreover, "attention must also be paid to the sides of the car" to achieve drag reduction such as techniques to reduce the cross-sectional area at the rear of the car to reduce the volume within the wake as in the case of a boat-tail design that extends back to a fine point.

=== Material types ===
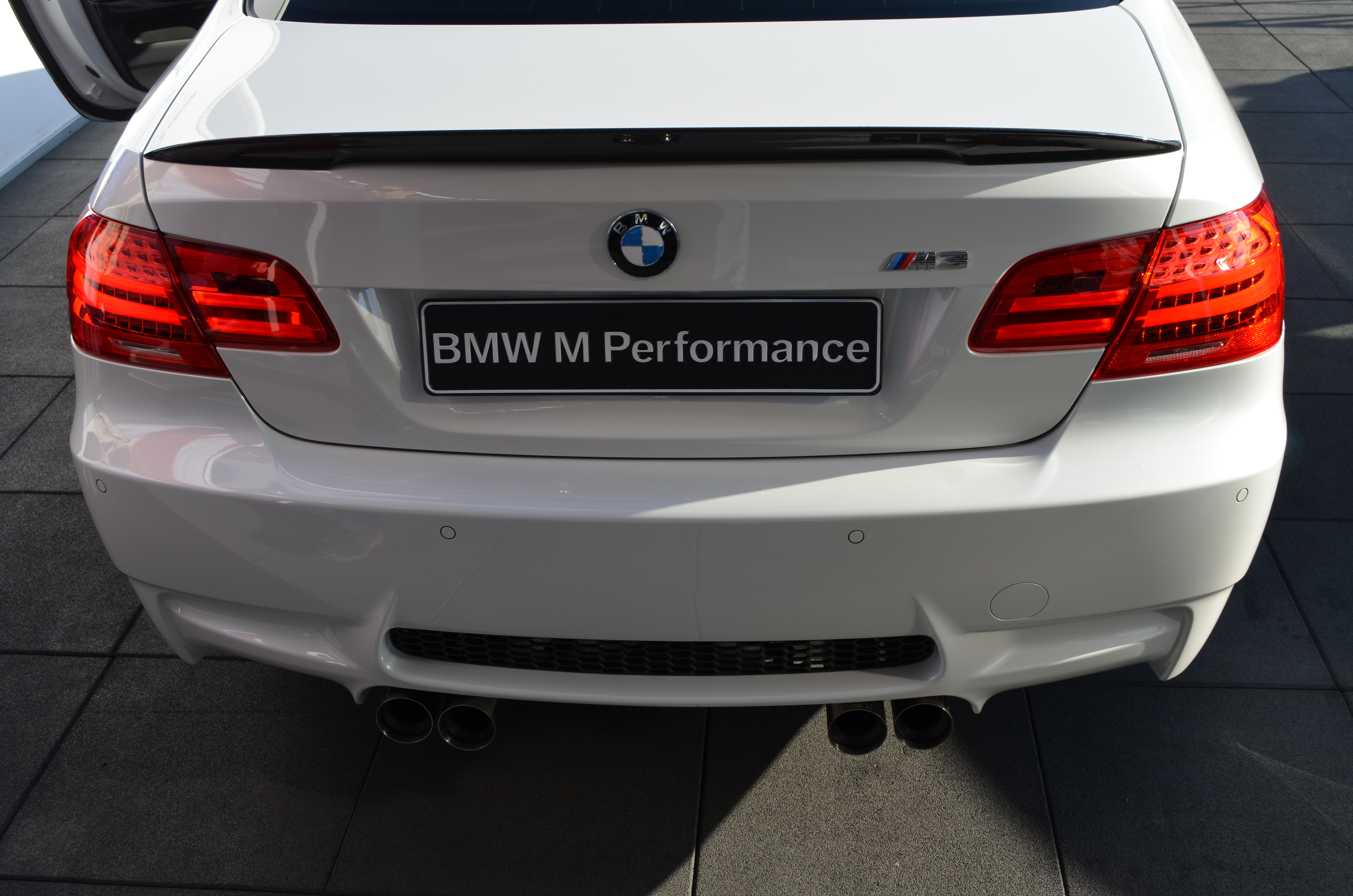
BMW E92 M3 Coupé with rear spoiler (black) made of carbon fiber

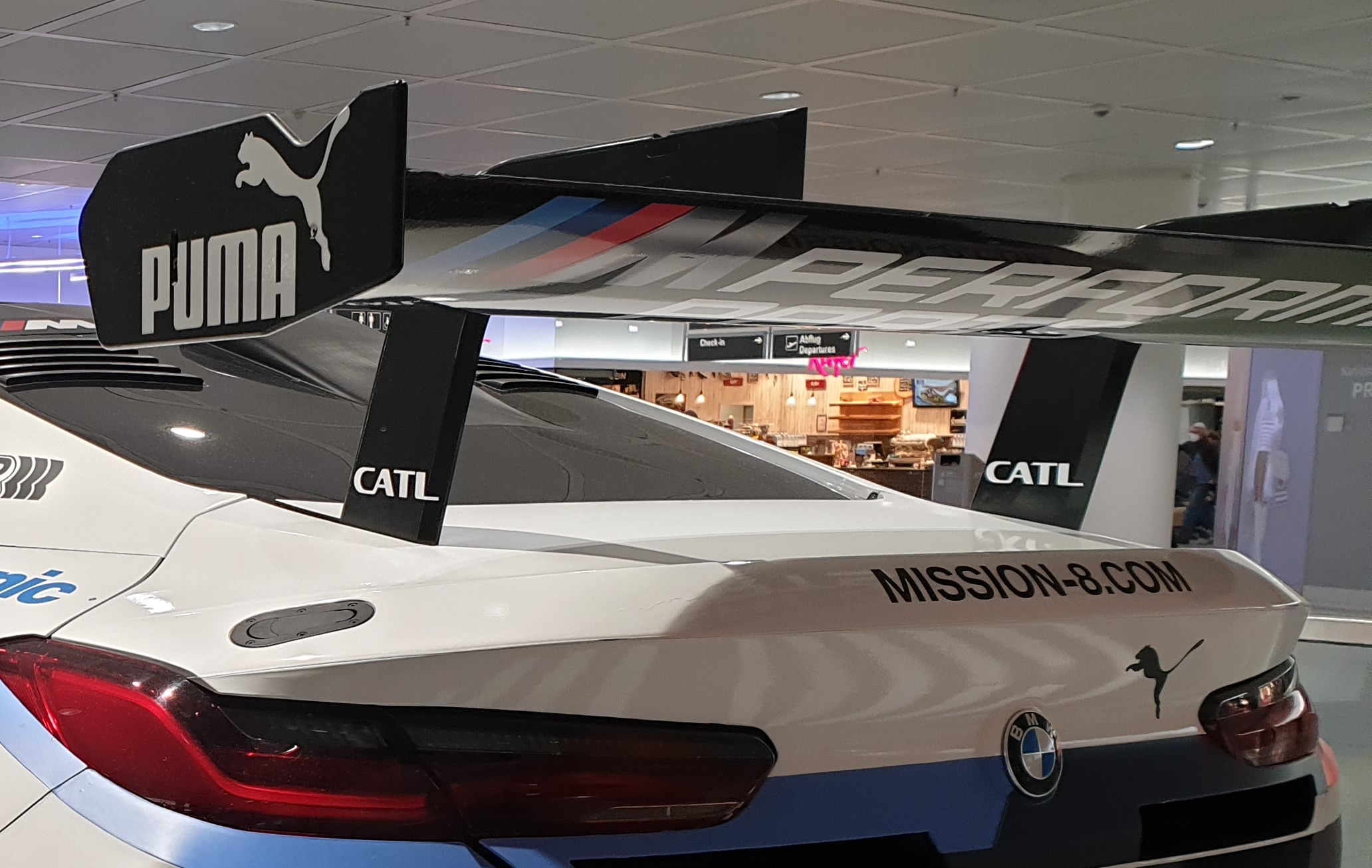
Rear wing on an endurance race car BMW M8 GTE made from carbon

Spoilers are usually made of lightweight polymer-based materials, including:

- ABS plastic: Most original equipment manufacturers produce spoilers by casting ABS plastic with various admixtures, typically granular fillers, which introduce stiffness to this inexpensive material. Frailness is the main disadvantage of plastic, which increases with product age and is caused by the evaporation of volatile phenols.
- Fiberglass: Used in car parts production due to the low cost of the materials. Fiberglass spoilers consist of fiberglass cloth infiltrated with a thermosetting resin, such as epoxy. Fiberglass is sufficiently durable and workable, but has become unprofitable for large-scale production because of the labor involved.
- Silicone: Some auto accessory manufacturers have recently used silicon-organic polymers. The main benefit of this material is its phenomenal plasticity. Silicone possesses extra high thermal characteristics and provides a longer product lifetime.
- Carbon fiber: Carbon fiber is lightweight, durable, and expensive. Due to a large amount of manual labor, large-scale production cannot widely use carbon fiber in automobile parts currently.

=== Other common spoiler types ===
- Front spoilers: A front spoiler (air dam) is positioned under or integrated with the front bumper. In racing, this spoiler controls the dynamics of handling related to the air in front of the vehicle. This can be to improve the drag coefficient of the vehicle's body at speed or generate downforce. In passenger vehicles, the focus shifts to directing the airflow into the engine bay for cooling purposes.
- Pickup truck bed spoiler: This attaches only to the top of the truck bed rails near the rear. Used with a bed cover, this spoiler is intended to reduce the air profile of the steep drop-off from the tailgate.
- Pickup truck cab spoiler: This works the same as above, except focusing on the drop-off from the truck's cab to the cargo bed.

== Active spoilers ==
An active spoiler dynamically adjusts while the vehicle operates based on the conditions presented, changing the spoiling effect, intensity, or other performance attributes. Found most often on sports cars and other passenger cars, the most common form is a rear spoiler that retracts and hides partially or entirely into the rear of the vehicle, then extends upwards when the vehicle exceeds a specific speed, such as the active spoiler in the Bugatti Veyron. Active front spoilers have also been implemented on specific models, in which the front spoiler or air dam extends further toward the road below to reduce drag at high speed. In most cases, the spoiler deployment is achieved with an electric motor controlled automatically by the onboard computer or other electronics, usually based on vehicle speed, driver setting, or other inputs. Often, the driver can manually deploy the spoiler if desired, but may not be able to retract the spoiler above a certain speed because doing so could dangerously diminish the high-speed handling qualities of the vehicle.

Active spoilers can offer additional benefits over fixed spoilers. Cosmetically, they can allow a cleaner or less cluttered appearance when the vehicle is parked or traveling at low speeds when it is most likely to be observed. A spoiler that hides may be appealing to vehicle designers who are seeking to improve high-speed aerodynamics (for example, the Porsche 911 or Audi TT) without drastically changing its appearance. Hiding a spoiler at low speeds can improve aerodynamics as well. At low speeds, a fixed spoiler may increase drag and does little to improve the vehicle's handling due to having little airflow over it. A retractable front spoiler can reduce the scraping of the car on curbs or other road imperfections, while still reducing drag at high speeds.

Powered fans, such as in the Chaparral 2J, do the equivalent of spoilers and increase the downforce, hence the traction and handling of the vehicle (See ground effect). Research continues on the use of fans to alter the aerodynamics of vehicles.

== Other vehicles ==
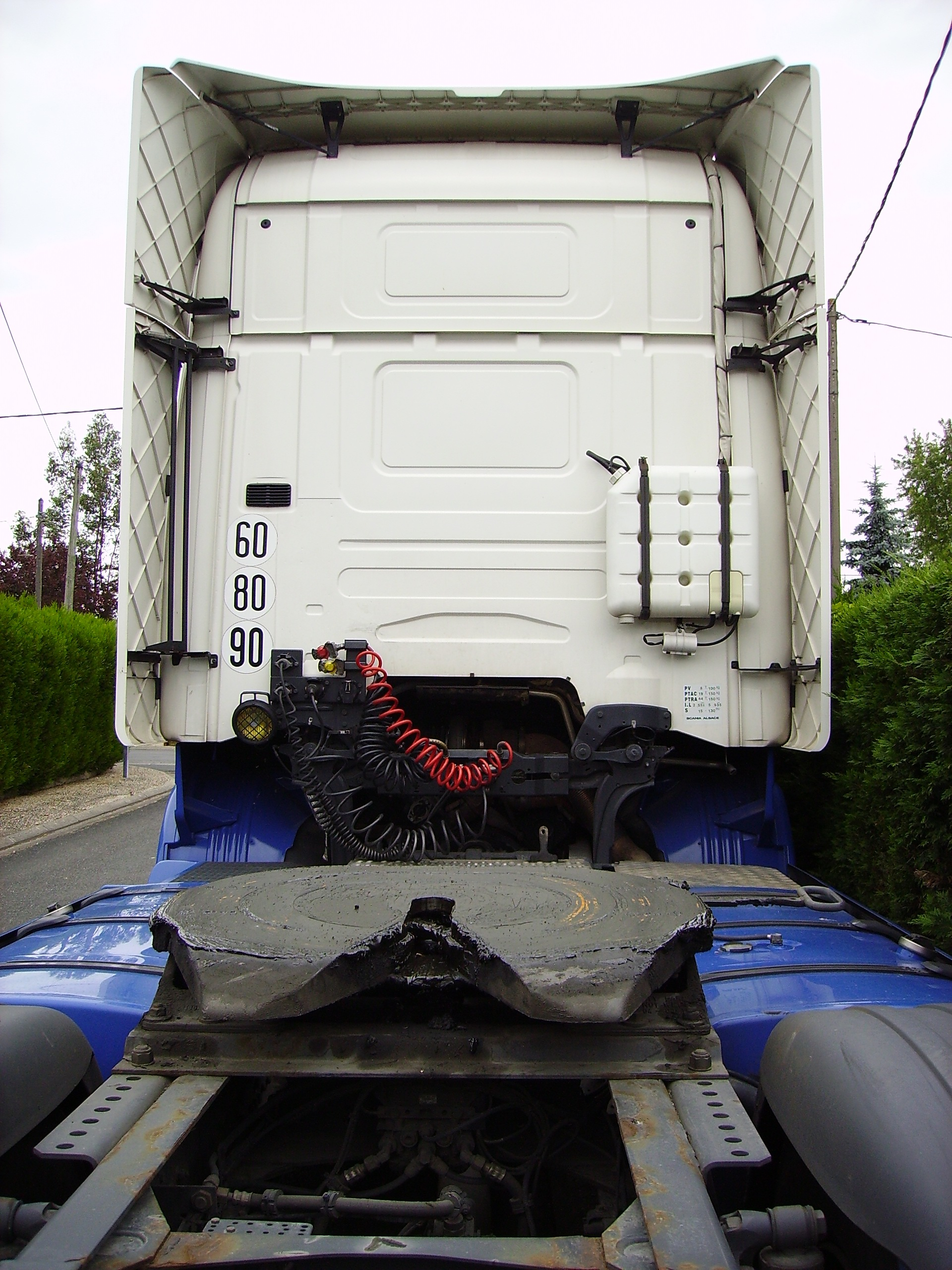
A Scania semi-trailer truck seen from behind. The spoilers attached to the top and sides of the cab are visible.

Heavy trucks, like long haul tractors, may also have a spoiler on the top and sides of the cab to lessen drag caused by air resistance from the trailer it is towing, which may be taller than the cab and reduce the aerodynamics of the vehicle dramatically without the use of this spoiler. The trailers they pull can also be fitted with under-side spoilers that angle outward to deflect passing air from the rear axle's wheels.

Trains may use spoilers to induce drag (like an air brake). A prototype Japanese high-speed train, the Fastech 360, is designed to reach speeds of 400 km/h (250 mph). Its nose is specifically designed to spoil a wind effect associated with passing through tunnels, and it can deploy 'ears' that slow the train in case of emergency by increasing its drag.

Some modern race cars employ a passive situational spoiler called a roof flap. The body of the car is designed to generate downforce while driving forward. These roof flaps deploy when the car's body is rotated to travel in reverse, a condition where the body generates lift instead. The roof flaps deploy because they are recessed into a pocket in the roof. The low pressure above this pocket will cause the flaps to deploy, and counteract some of the lift generated by the car, making it more resistant to coming out of contact with the ground. These devices were introduced in 1994 in NASCAR following Rusty Wallace's crash at Talladega.

== Whale tail ==
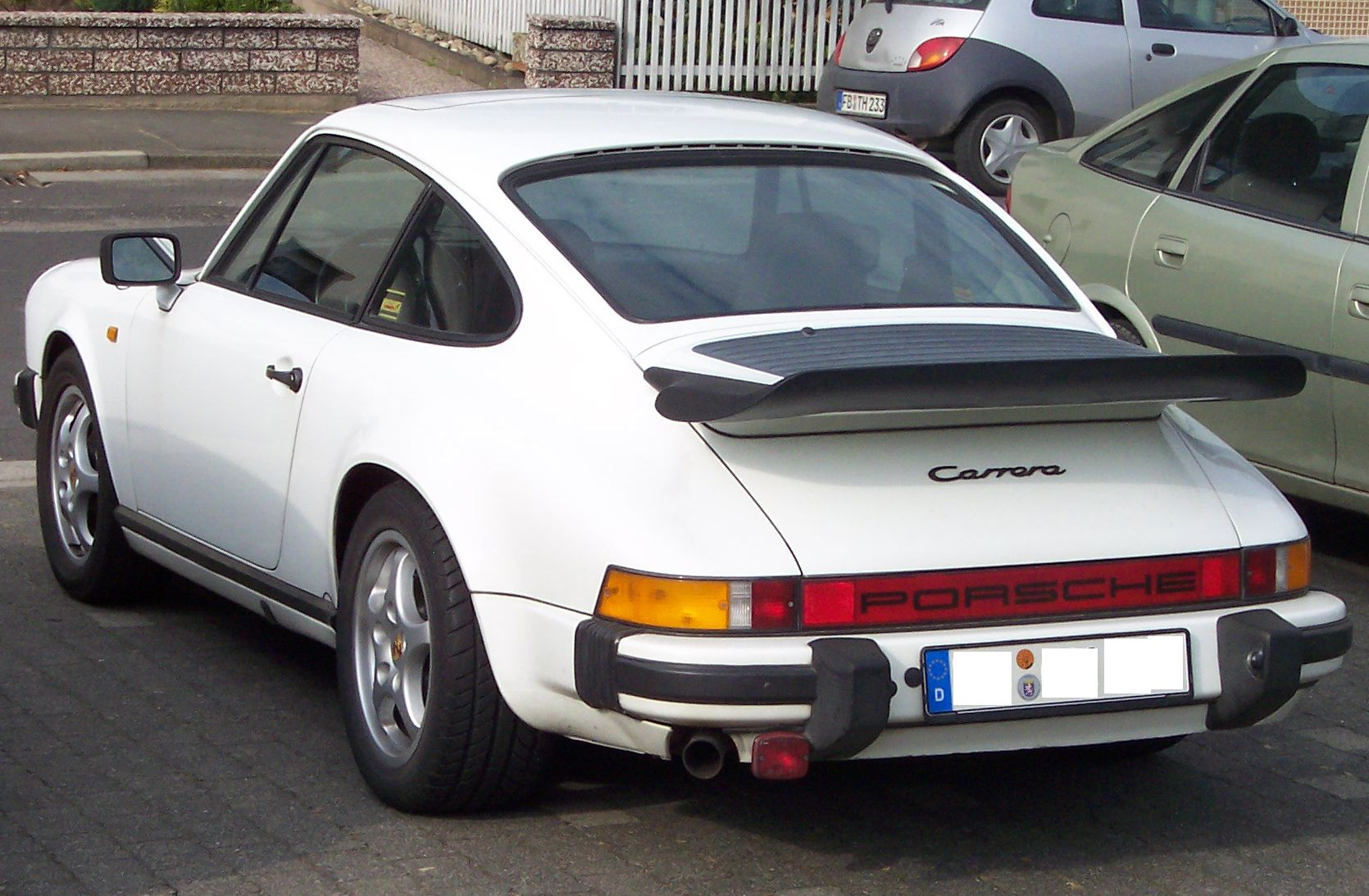
Original whale tail as introduced on the 1975 3.0 litre Porsche 911 Turbo

When the Porsche 911 Turbo debuted in August 1974, with large, flared, rear spoilers, they were immediately dubbed whale tails. Designed to reduce rear-end lift and so keep the car from oversteering at high speeds, the rubber edges of the whale tail spoilers were thought to be "pedestrian friendly". The Turbo with its whale tail became recognizable. From 1978, the rear spoiler was redesigned and dubbed 'tea tray' because of its raised sides. The Porsche 911 whale tails were used in conjunction with a chin spoiler attached to the front valence panel, which, according to some sources, did not enhance aerodynamic stability. It is less effective in multiplying downforce than newer technologies like an airfoil, "rear wing running across the base of the tailgate window", or "an electronically controlled wing that deploys at about 50 mph (80 km/h)"

=== History ===
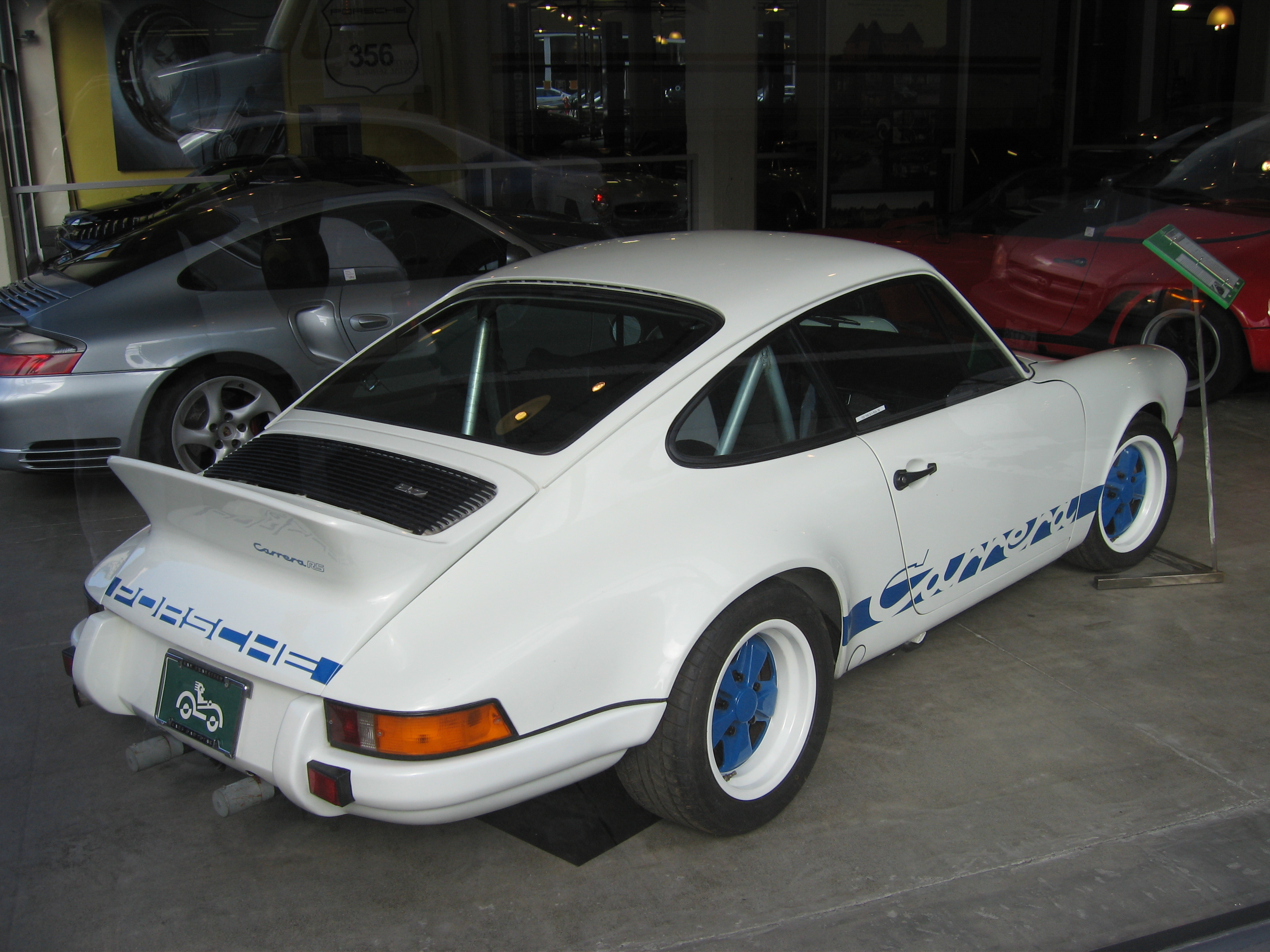
Duck tail on a 1973 Porsche 911 Carrera RS

The whale tail came on the heels of the 1973 "duck tail" or Bürzel in German (as a part of the E-program), a smaller and less flared rear-spoiler fitted to 911 Carrera RS (meaning Rennsport or race sport in German), optional outside Germany. The whale tail was originally designed for Porsche 930 and Porsche 935 race cars in 1973, and introduced to the Turbo in 1974 (as a part of the H-program); it was also an option on non-turbo Carreras from 1975. Both types of spoilers were designed while Ernst Fuhrmann was serving as the Technical Director of Porsche AG. In 1976, a rubber front chin spoiler was also introduced to offset the more effective spoiler. By 1978, Porsche introduced another design for the rear spoiler, the "teatray", a boxier enclosure which accommodated the intercooler, and was also an option for the 911SC.

=== Other vehicles ===
The whale tail car spoilers of the Porsche 911 caught on as a fashion statement, and the term has been used to refer to large rear spoilers on a number of automobiles, including Ford Sierra RS Cosworth, Chevrolet Camaro, and Saab 900. Whale tail spoilers also appear at the rear of tricycles, trucks, boats, and other vehicles.

== Gallery ==
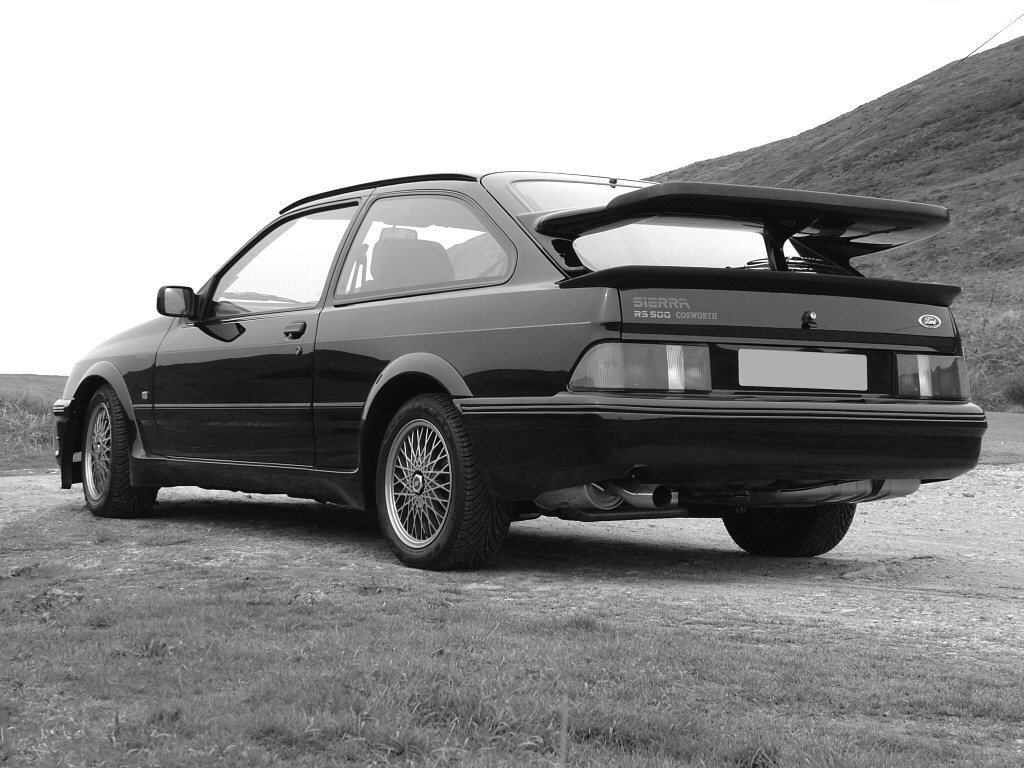
Ford Sierra RS Cosworth factory-installed rear spoiler

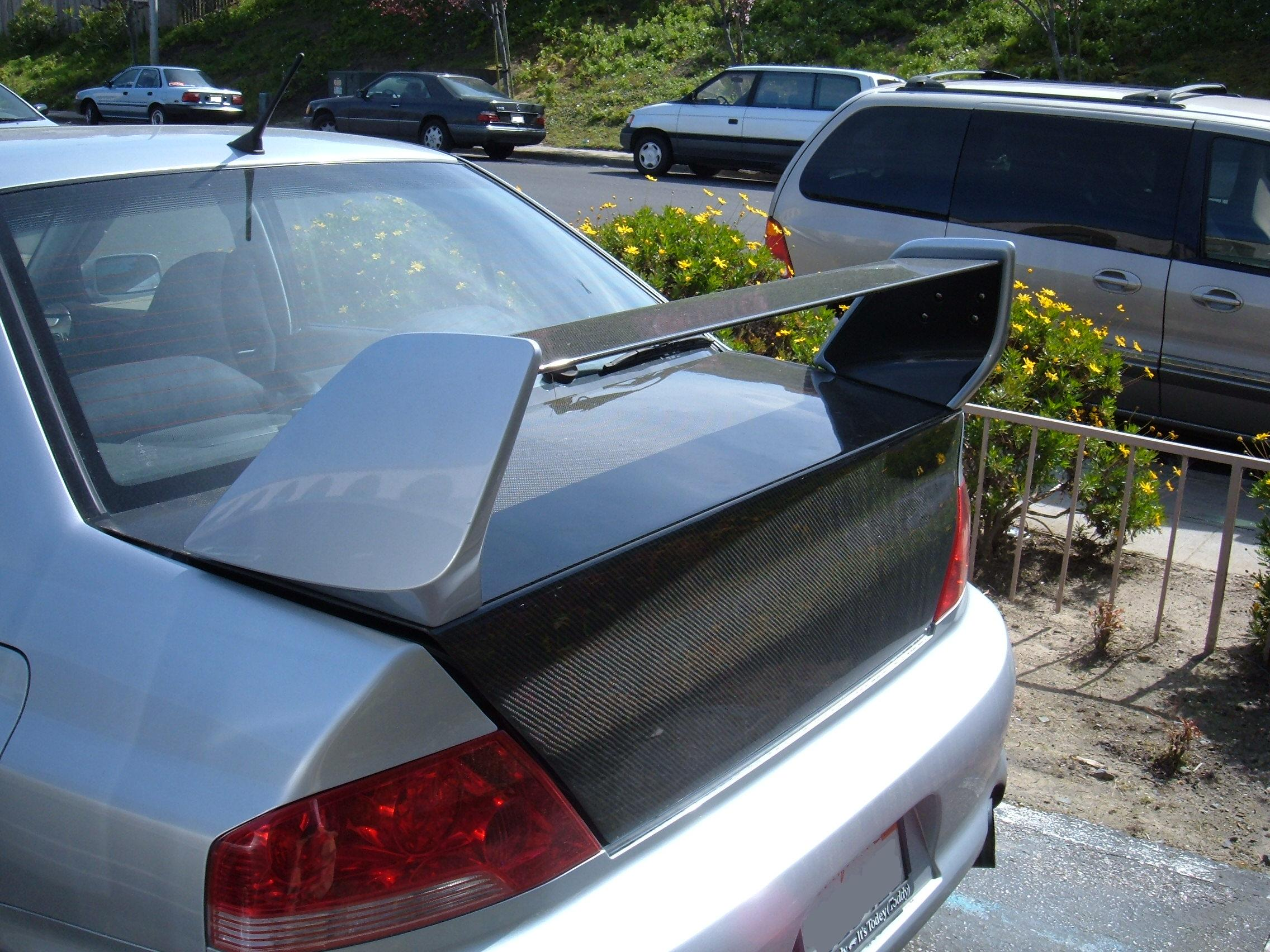
Mitsubishi Lancer Evolution spoiler

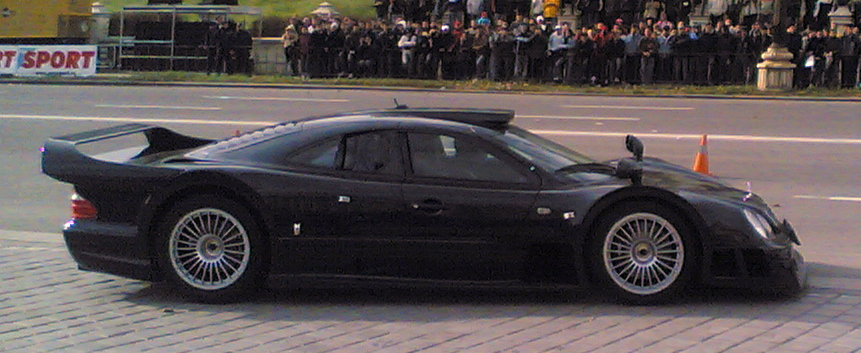
Mercedes-Benz CLK GTR

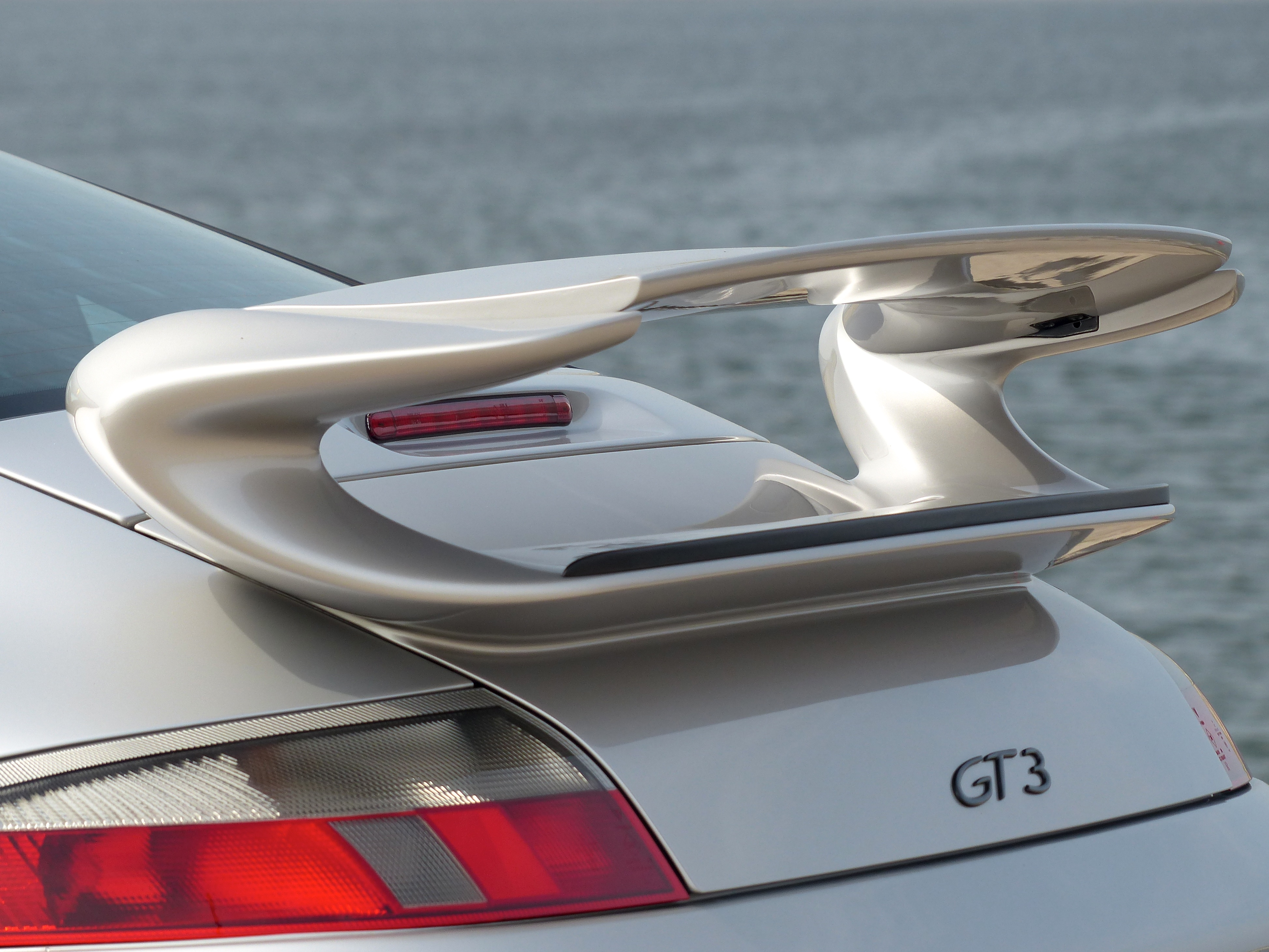
Porsche 996 GT3

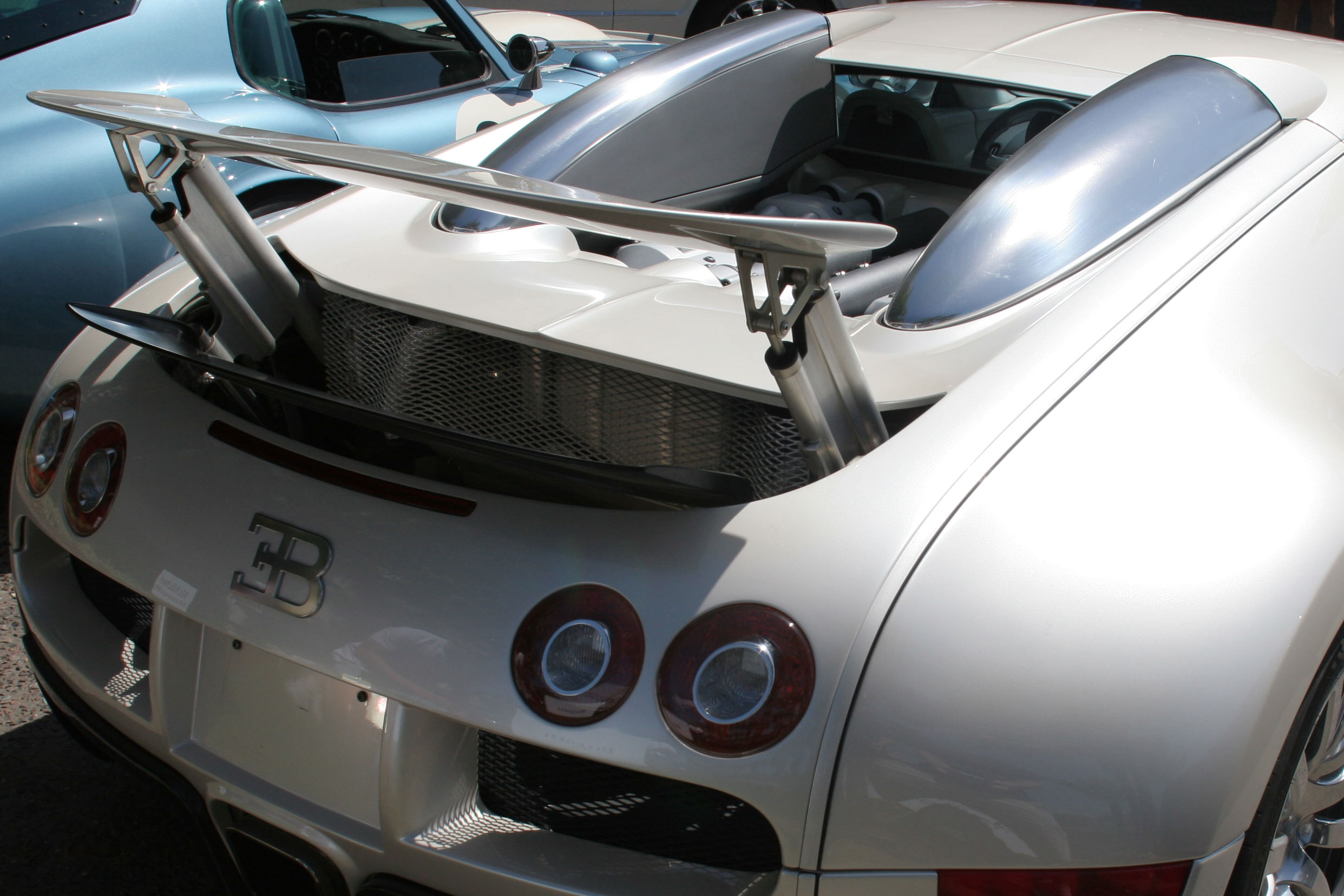
Retractable Spoiler on a Bugatti Veyron

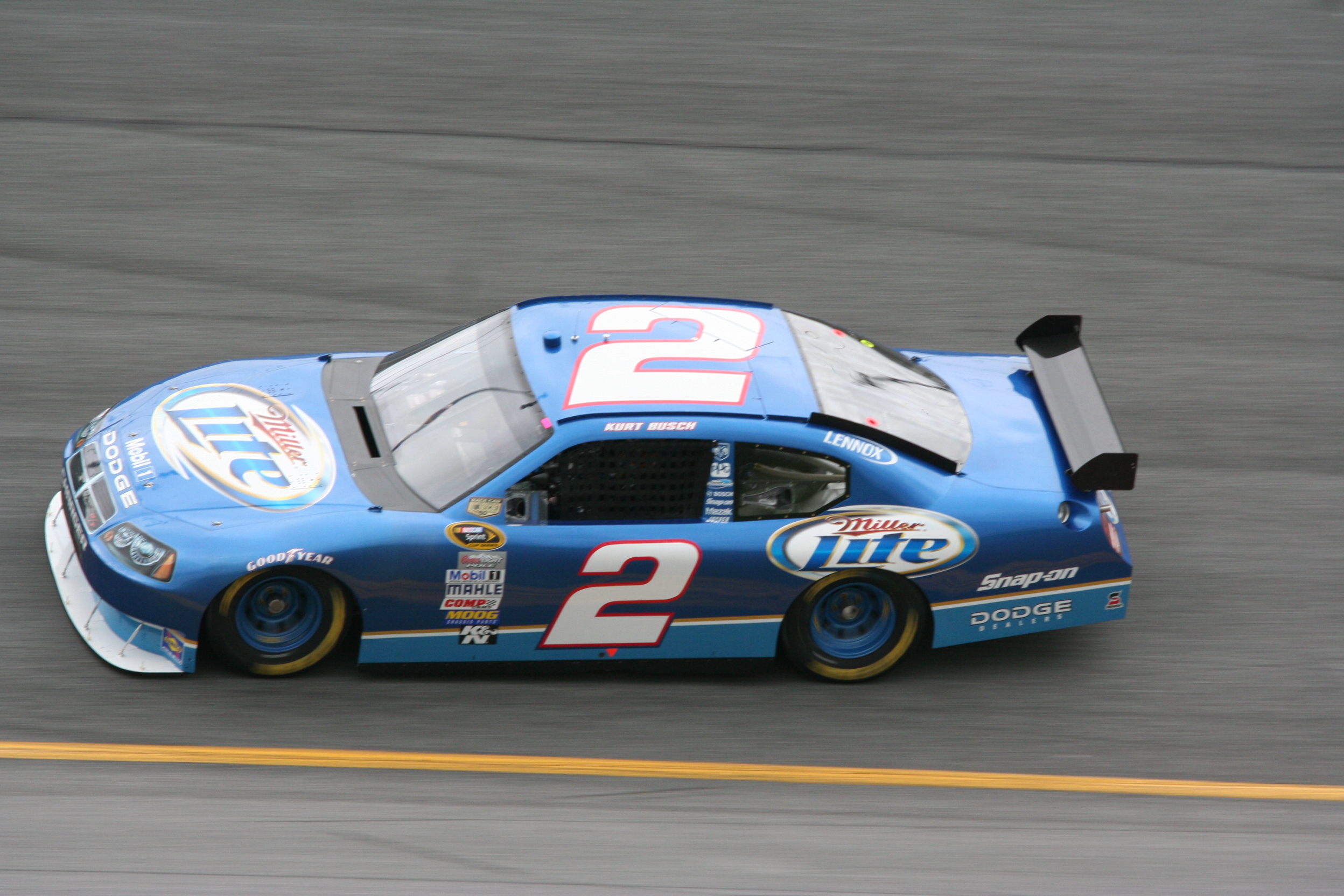
NASCAR Dodge Charger

== See also ==
- Aerofoil
- Car tailfin
- Diffuser
- Gurney flap
- List of auto parts
