= Robert H. Liebeck =

American aerospace engineer (1938–2026)

- Born: February 1, 1938; Chicago, Illinois, U.S.
- Died: January 12, 2026 (aged 87)
- Education: University of Illinois at Urbana–Champaign
- Occupation: Aircraft engineer
- Employer(s): Boeing, University of California, Irvine, Massachusetts Institute of Technology, University of Southern California
- Known for: Aircraft designs Liebeck airfoils

Robert Hauschild Liebeck (February 1, 1938 – January 12, 2026) was an American aerodynamicist, professor and aerospace engineer. Until retiring from his position as senior fellow at the Boeing Company in 2020, he oversaw their Blended Wing Body ("BWB") program. He was a member of the National Academy of Engineering since 1992, where he was an AIAA Honorary Fellow, the organization’s highest distinction. He is best known for his contributions to aircraft design and his pioneering airfoil designs known as the "Liebeck Airfoil". After retirement he remained active in the aviation industry, most recently at the BWB startup JetZero where he served as a technical advisor, and continued to teach aerospace courses at University of California, Irvine.

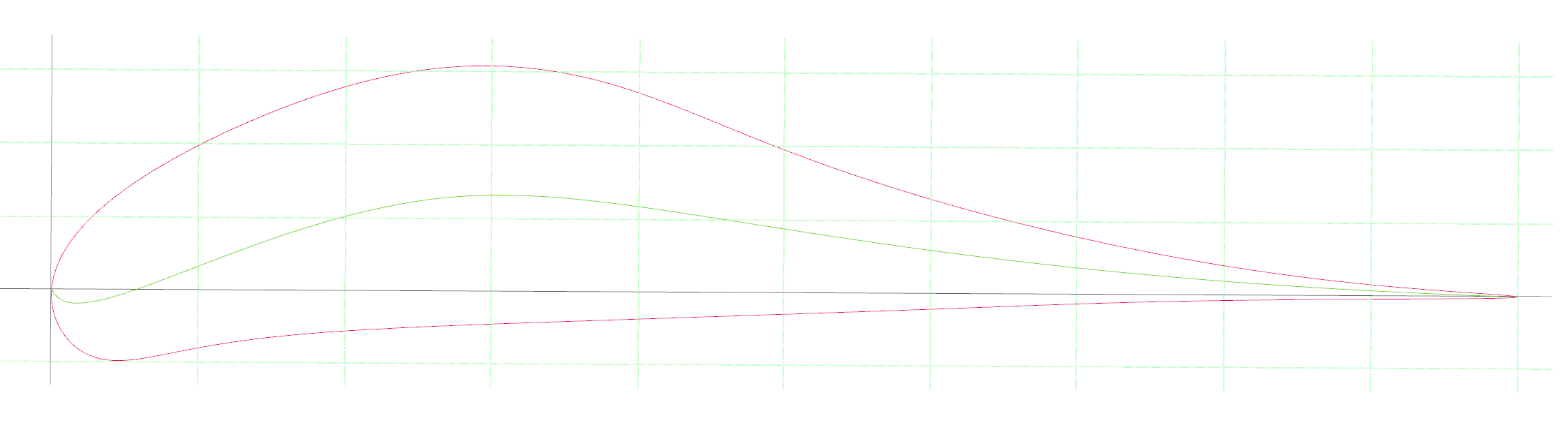
A CAD rendering of the Liebeck airfoil.

== Education ==
Liebeck pursued studies in aerospace engineering at the University of Illinois at Urbana–Champaign. He graduated with a Bachelor of Science in 1961, a Master of Science in 1962 and a PhD in 1968. It was while pursuing his PhD that he produced the first airfoil designs that would come to be known as the "Liebeck Airfoil".

== Career ==
Liebeck worked summers at the Douglas Aircraft Company, located in Santa Monica, California, until he joined the permanent staff in 1968. He remained with the company after its merger with McDonnell Douglas, which later merged with Boeing in 1997. He managed several of Boeing's airplane programs through which several advanced-concept aircraft were designed. As Senior Technical Fellow of the Boeing Company, he served as program manager of the company's blended wing body program. Liebeck was one of the first Senior Technical Advisors to the startup JetZero in Long Beach, CA, co-founded by one of Dr. Liebeck's early Blended Wing disciple, Mark Page.

== Designs ==
=== Liebeck airfoils ===
Designs made by Liebeck during research for his doctoral thesis "Optimization of Airfoils for Maximum Lift", have been applied to the design of high-altitude aircraft. This class of airfoils has been used by NASCAR in its Car of Tomorrow which debuted in 2007.

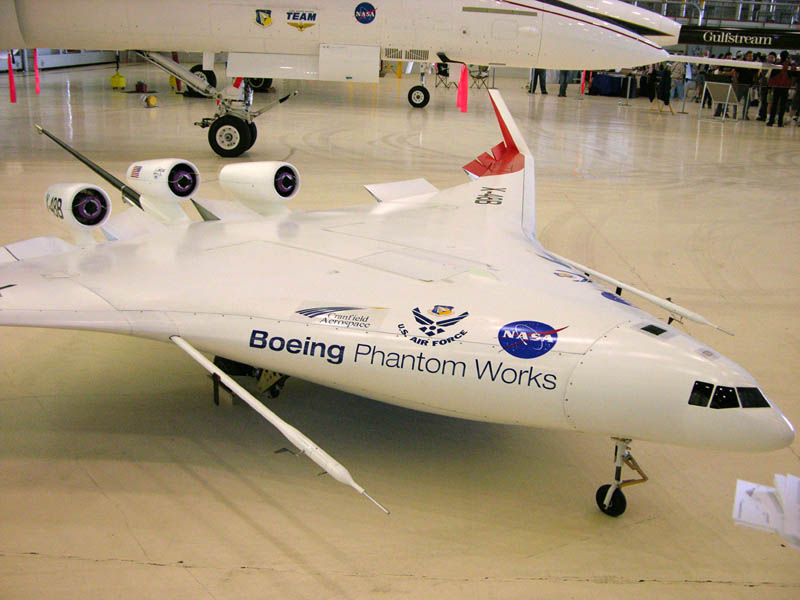
Boeing X-48 test model

=== Blended wing body ===
Boeing has invested in a blended wing body airplane program since 1993, a program which Liebeck managed. Run through Boeing's Phantom Works division, the program researched, designed and prototyped new aircraft designs which would reduce energy consumption and noise production. Initially funded by a grant from NASA of $90,000, the aircraft design moves away from the usual tube-and-wing design and instead has the wings blended into the body. This design was developed by Liebeck, in conjunction with other members of the research team. Liebeck's team released a remote-driven model, the X-48, in 1997, flight tested a three-engine version, the X-48B, in 2008-9 and a two-engine version, the X-48C in 2013.

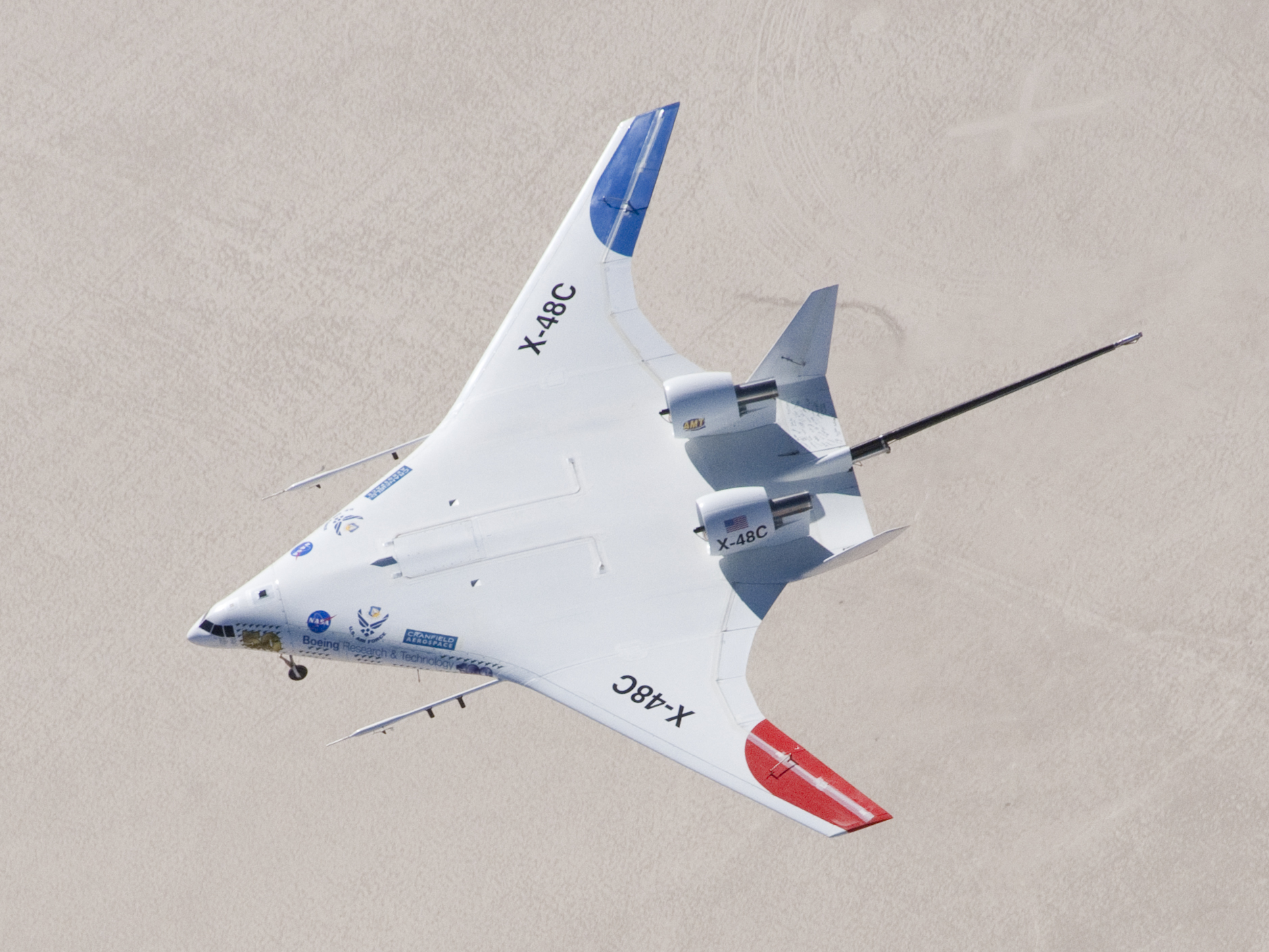
The NASA X48C, the culmination of Liebeck's work on Blended Wing Body aircraft.

=== Other designs ===
Liebeck's designs include propellers, wind turbines, wings for racing cars that have won the Indianapolis 500 and the Formula One World Championship, the wing for NASCAR's "Car of Tomorrow," the keel for the America³ yacht which won the 1992 America's Cup, and the wing for a World Championship aerobatic airplane.

== Teaching career ==
Liebeck lectured in aerodynamics and aircraft design courses at several universities. Since 1995 he was a Professor of the Practice of Aerodynamics at the Massachusetts Institute of Technology where he lectured in aeronautics.. Liebeck was also an adjunct professor at the University of California, Irvine from 2000 to 2025, where he taught aerospace engineering courses. He was also an adjunct professor teaching aerodynamics, flight mechanics and airplane design at the University of Southern California from 1977 to 2000.

== Death ==
Liebeck died on January 12, 2026, at the age of 87.

== Awards and recognition ==
Liebeck was presented with the Brigadier General Charles E. "Chuck" Yeager International Aeronautical Achievement Award in 2012. In 2011 Liebeck was inducted into the Hall of Fame at the College of Engineering at Illinois, an honor which "recognizes Illinois engineering alumni, and others affiliated with the college, who have made significant achievements in leadership, entrepreneurship, and innovation of great impact to society". That same year he was presented with "Engineering the Future" award from the Henry Samueli School of Engineering for his work in aeronautics and contributions to the school.

Liebeck's awards and honors include:

- 2010 AIAA Honorary Fellow
- 2010 Daniel Guggenheim Medal for "distinguished engineering as evidenced by the conception and development of Liebeck airfoils and blended wing body aircraft."
- 1992 Member of the National Academy of Engineering for the development of high-lift, high-performance airfoils.
- Royal Aeronautical Society Fellow
- ASME Spirit of St. Louis Medal
- ICAS Innovation in Aerodynamics Award
- AIAA Wright Brothers Lecture
- AIAA Aircraft Design Award
- AIAA Aerodynamics Award

== Publications ==
- Liebeck, R. H. (2004). "Design of the Blended Wing Body Subsonic Transport". Journal of Aircraft. 41 (1): 10–25. doi:10.2514/1.9084.
- Liebeck, Robert H. (1995). "Advanced Subsonic Airplane: Design and Economic Studies". NASA Contractor Report. 195443.
- Adkins, Charles N.; Liebeck, Robert H. (1994). "Design of optimum propellers". Journal of Propulsion and Power. 10 (5): 676–682. doi:10.2514/3.23779.
- Callaghan, J.; Liebeck, R. (1990). "Some Thoughts on the Design of Subsonic Transport Aircraft for the 21st Century". SAE Technical Paper 901987. SAE Technical Paper Series. 1. doi:10.4271/901987.
- Liebeck, Robert H. (1989). "Low Reynolds Number Airfoil Design for Subsonic Compressible Flow". Low Reynolds Number Aerodynamics. Lecture Notes in Engineering. Vol. 54. Springer Berlin Heidelberg. pp. 314–330. doi:10.1007/978-3-642-84010-4_23. ISBN 978-3-540-51884-6.
- Liebeck, Robert H. (1978). "Design of Subsonic Airfoils for High Lift". Journal of Aircraft. 15 (9, number 9): 547–561. doi:10.2514/3.58406. S2CID 110168194.
- Liebeck, Robert H. (1973). "A Class of Airfoils Designed for High Lift in Incompressible Flow". Journal of Aircraft. 10 (10): 610–617. doi:10.2514/3.60268.
- Liebeck, Robert H.; Douglas Aircraft Co. (1971). Theoretical Studies on the Aerodynamics of Slat-Airfoil Combinations. Long Beach, California: Defense Technical Information Center.
- Liebeck, R. H.; Ormsbee, A.I. (1970). "Optimization of airfoils for maximum lift". Journal of Aircraft. 7 (5): 409–416. doi:10.2514/3.44192. S2CID 108529998.
