= JetZero =

American aviation company

- Industry: Aerospace
- Founded: 2021; 5 years ago in Long Beach, California
- Founders: Tom O’Leary (CEO); Mark Page (CTO)
- Headquarters: Long Beach, California, U.S.
- Website: www.jetzero.aero

JetZero is an American startup company in the aviation industry founded in Long Beach, California, in 2021. It focuses on blended wing body aircraft. The company announced it will build its first manufacturing plant near Piedmont Triad International Airport in Guilford County, North Carolina, which will produce its next-generation aircraft.

== History ==
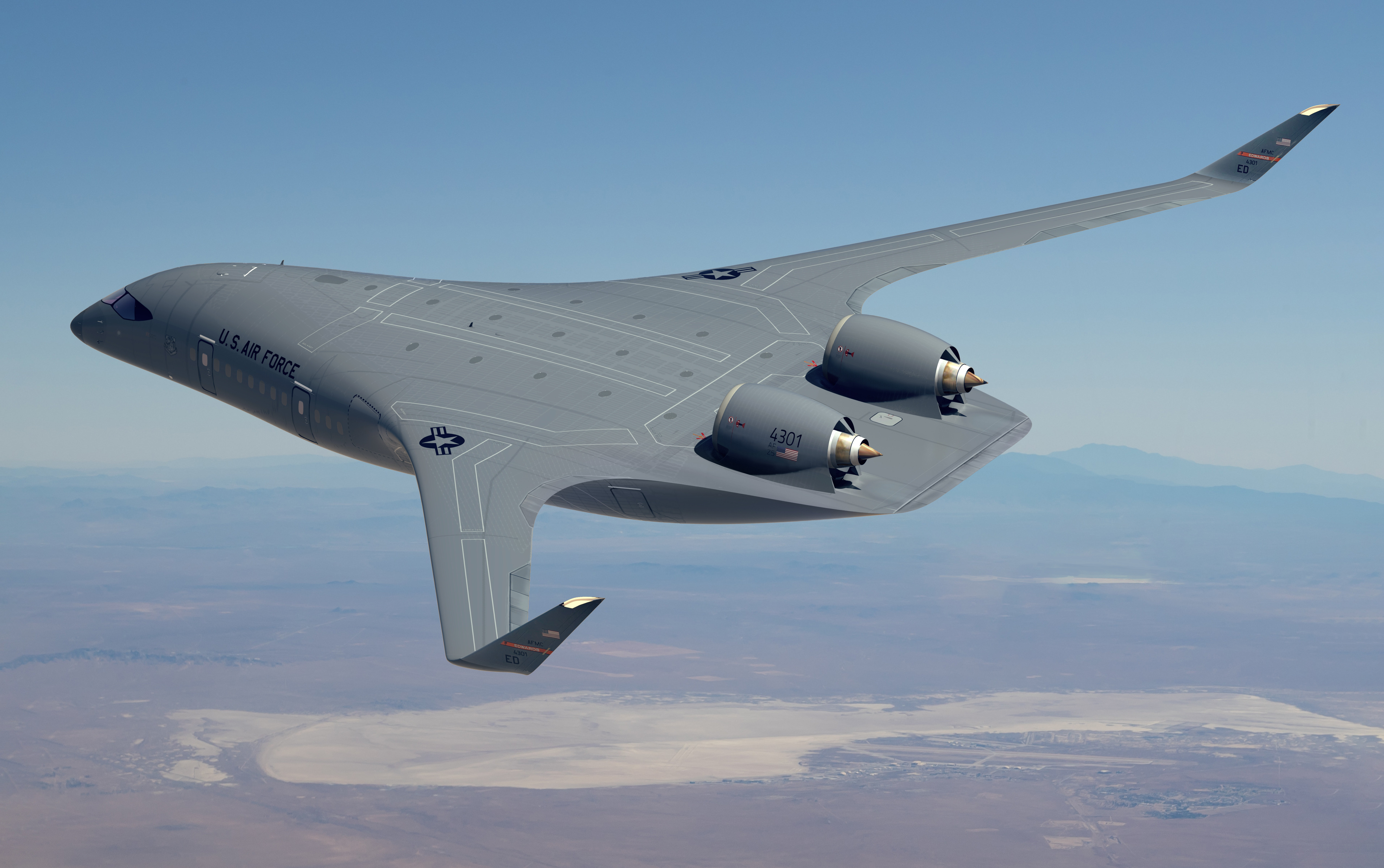
A rendering of the JetZero blended wing body aircraft prototype for the US Air Force

In 2023, JetZero announced its Z4 project, designed to carry 250 passengers, targeting the middle-of-the-market category, to use existing Pratt & Whitney PW2040 43,000 lbf (190 kN) engines. In August 2023, the U.S. Air Force announced a $235-million contract awarded over a four-year period to JetZero, culminating in first flight of the full-scale demonstrator by the first quarter of 2027. The goal of the contract is to demonstrate the capabilities of BWB technology, giving the Department of Defense and commercial industry more options for their future air platforms. In January 2024 the company began moving into a 275,000 sq ft (25,500 m^{2}) space at Long Beach Airport formerly occupied by Gulfstream. In March 2024 its Pathfinder 1:8 scale demonstrator received its airworthiness certificate from the U.S. Federal Aviation Administration (FAA), clearing the aircraft for test flights at Edwards Air Force Base in California.

The Demonstrator aircraft is being built in partnership with Scaled Composites (Northrop Grumman). It will use a Pratt and Whitney PW2040 engine, and nacelles built by Collins Aerospace

In 2025, JetZero continued development of its full-scale blended wing body (BWB) demonstrator, known as Jet1, with construction taking place at Scaled Composites' facility in Mojave, California. The program remained focused on achieving a first flight in 2027 under the U.S. Air Force contract. The company also continued flight testing of its Pathfinder series of subscale aircraft, using the data collected to refine flight-control software, aerodynamic models, and the configuration of the full-scale demonstrator.

== Programs ==
- Pathfinder;
- The Z4, which is V-shaped. According to the manufacturer, the aircraft will be able to carry 250 passengers over a distance of more than 9,000 kilometers.
