= Blended wing body =

Aircraft design with no clear divide between fuselage and wing

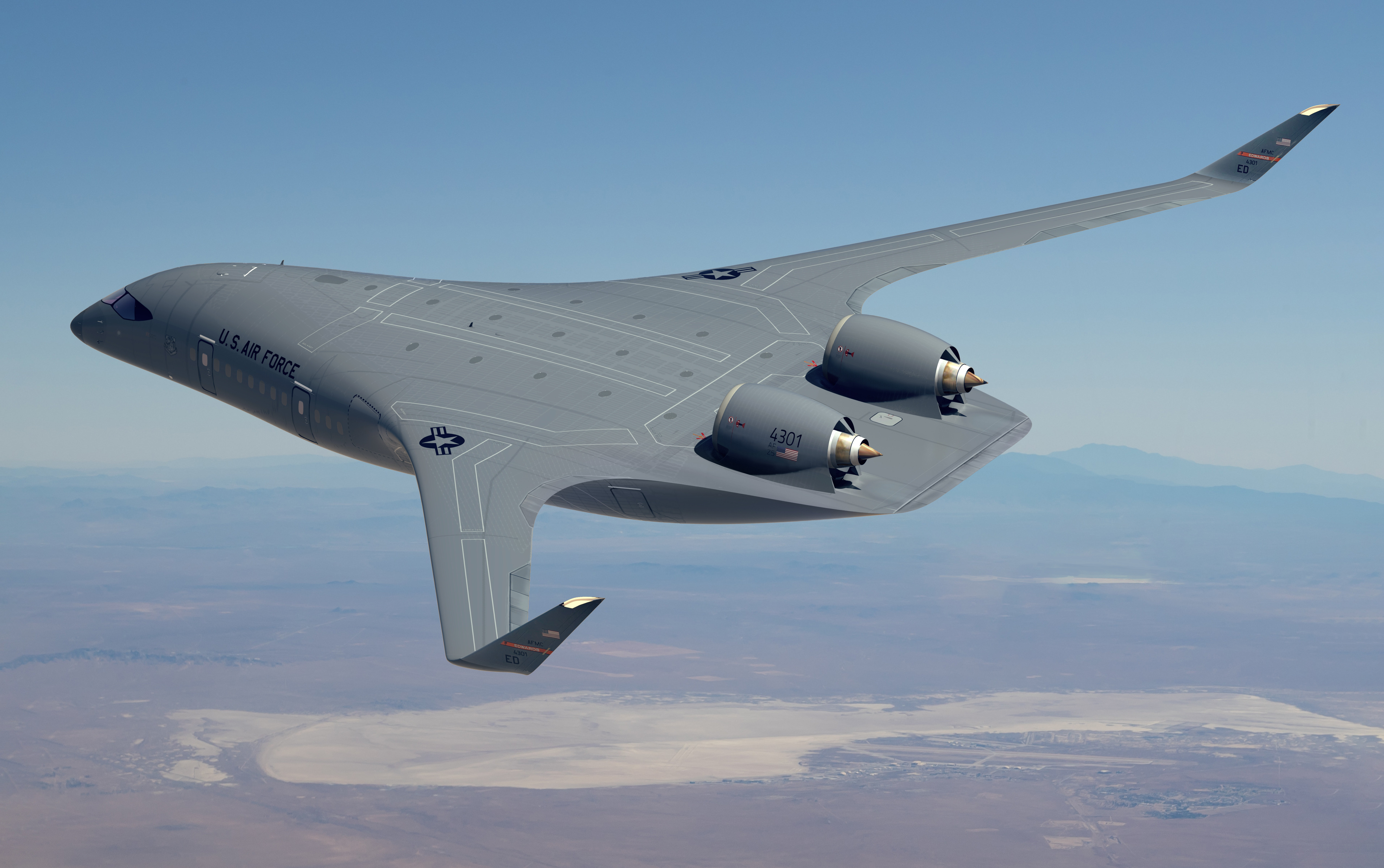
A rendering of the US Air Force blended wing body aircraft project

A blended wing body (BWB), also known as blended body, hybrid wing body (HWB) or a lifting aerofoil fuselage, is a fixed-wing aircraft having no clear dividing line between the wings and the main body of the craft. The aircraft has distinct wing and body structures, which are smoothly blended together with no clear dividing line. This contrasts with a flying wing, which has no distinct fuselage, and a lifting body, which has no distinct wings. A BWB design may or may not be tailless.

The main advantage of the BWB is to reduce wetted area and the accompanying form drag associated with a conventional wing-body junction. It may also be given a wide airfoil-shaped body, allowing the entire craft to generate lift, thus reducing the size and drag of the wings and potentially fuel consumption.

The BWB configuration is used for both aircraft and underwater gliders.

== History ==
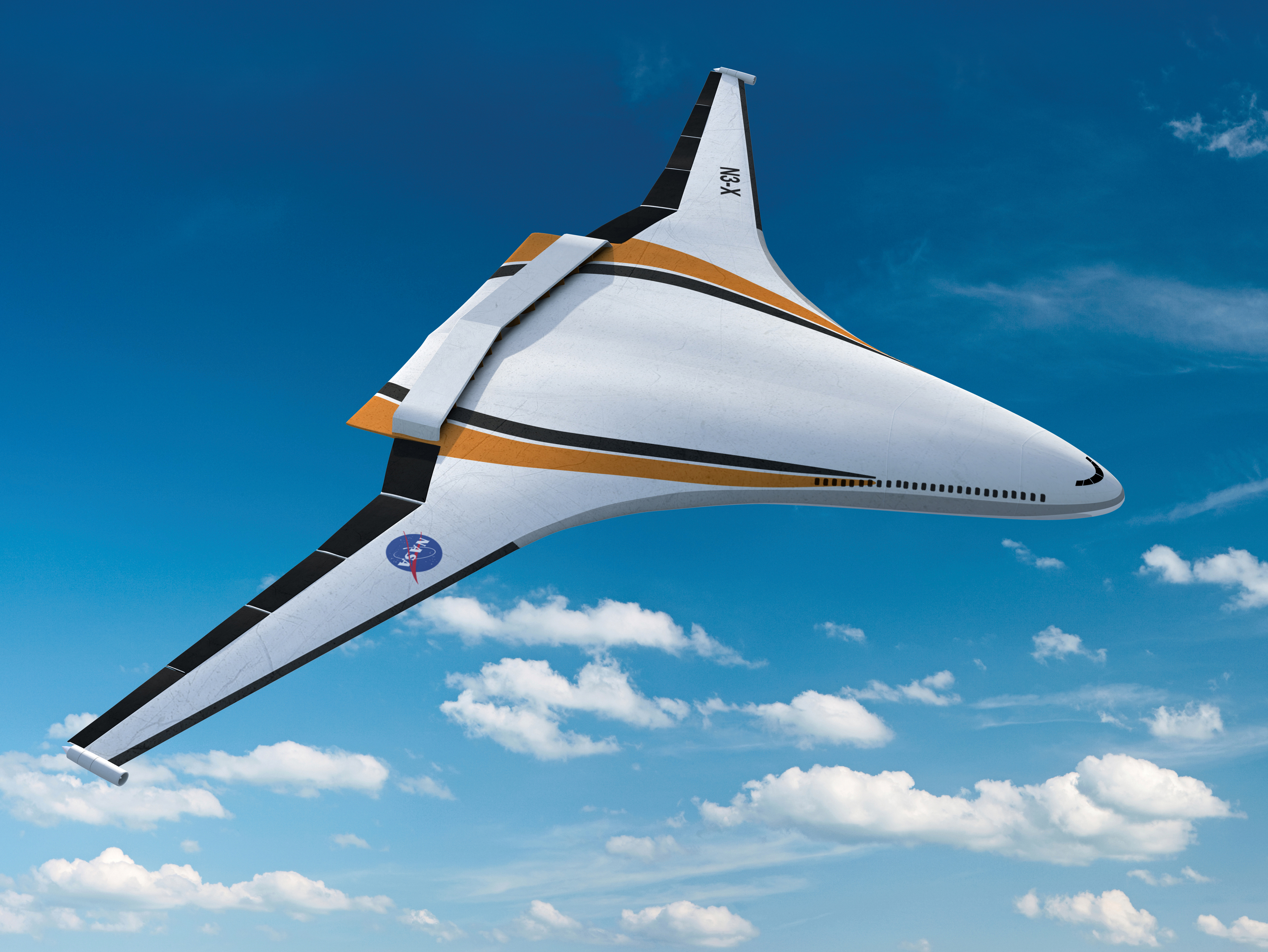
The N3-X NASA concept

The idea of the blended wing-body was conceived during the pioneer era, and was briefly flown on a full-size aircraft in 1924.

From 1911 to 1916, a group of Finnish students flew models of up to 3 m (10 ft) span, eventually arriving at a blended wing-body design which was inherently stable.

In the early 1920s Nicolas Woyevodsky developed a theory of the BWB and, following wind tunnel tests, the Westland Dreadnought was built. It stalled on its first flight in 1924, severely injuring the pilot, and the project was cancelled. The idea was proposed again in the early 1940s for a Miles M.26 airliner project and the Miles M.30 "X Minor" research prototype was built to investigate it. The McDonnell XP-67 prototype interceptor also flew in 1944 but did not meet expectations.

NASA and McDonnell Douglas returned to the concept in the 1990s with an artificially stabilized 17-foot (5.2 m) model (6% scale) called BWB-17, built by Stanford University, which was flown in 1997 and showed good handling qualities. From 2000 NASA went on to develop a remotely controlled research model with a 21-foot (6.4 m) wingspan.

NASA has also jointly explored BWB designs for the Boeing X-48 unmanned aerial vehicle. Studies suggested that a BWB airliner carrying from 450 to 800 passengers could achieve fuel savings of over 20 percent.

Airbus is studying a BWB design as a possible replacement for the A320neo family. A sub-scale model flew for the first time in June 2019 as part of the MAVERIC (Model Aircraft for Validation and Experimentation of Robust Innovative Controls) programme, which Airbus hopes will help it reduce CO_{2} emissions by up to 50% relative to 2005 levels.

The N3-X NASA concept uses a number of superconducting electric motors to drive the distributed fans to lower the fuel burn, emissions, and noise. The power to drive these electric fans is generated by two wingtip-mounted gas-turbine-driven superconducting electric generators. This idea for a possible future aircraft is called a "hybrid wing body" or sometimes a blended wing body. In this design, the wing blends seamlessly into the body of the aircraft, which makes it extremely aerodynamic and holds great promise for dramatic reductions in fuel consumption, noise and emissions. NASA develops concepts like these to test in computer simulations and as models in wind tunnels to prove whether the possible benefits would actually occur.

=== 2020s ===
In 2020, Airbus presented a BWB concept as part of its ZEROe initiative and demonstrated a small-scale aircraft. In 2022, Bombardier announced its EcoJet project. In 2023, California startup JetZero announced its Z4 project, designed to carry 250 passengers, targeting the New Midmarket Airplane category, expecting to use existing CFM International LEAP or Pratt & Whitney PW1000G 35,000 lbf (160 kN) engines. In August 2023, the U.S. Air Force announced a $235-million contract awarded over a four-year period to JetZero, culminating in first flight of the full-scale demonstrator by the first quarter of 2027. The goal of the contract is to demonstrate the capabilities of BWB technology, giving the Department of Defense and commercial industry more options for their future air platforms.

Following this development, JetZero has received FAA clearance for test flights of its Pathfinder, a 'blended-wing' demonstrator plane designed to significantly reduce drag and fuel consumption. This innovative design could potentially lower emissions by 50%. Scheduled for full-scale development by 2030, JetZero plans to create variants for passengers, cargo, and military use. The project faces challenges in certification and integration with current airport infrastructures.

California company Natilus announced the development of two BWB aircraft targeting the narrowbody market: a regional cargo aircraft, KONA, which can carry a payload of 3.8 metric tons and has a range of 900 nautical miles. Made of carbon fibre and fibreglass composites, KONA can be optionally piloted and is powered by jet engines developed by Pratt & Whitney. Natilus's first passenger aircraft, the HORIZON, can carry a payload of 25 tons with a range of 3,500 nautical miles. The aircraft can carry up to 200 passengers. Natilus's innovative BWB design is expected to lower carbon emissions by 50%, increase payload by 40% and reduce fuel consumption by 30% compared to tube-and-wing aircraft today.

== Characteristics ==
The wide interior spaces created by the blending pose novel structural challenges. NASA has been studying foam-clad stitched-fabric carbon fiber composite skinning to create uninterrupted cabin space.

The BWB form minimizes the total wetted area – the surface area of the aircraft skin – thus reducing skin drag to a minimum. It also creates a thickening of the wing root area, allowing a more efficient structure and reduced weight compared to a conventional craft. NASA also plans to integrate Ultra High Bypass (UHB) ratio jet engines with the hybrid wing body.

A conventional tubular fuselage carries 12–13% of the total lift compared to 31–43% carried by the centerbody in a BWB, where an intermediate lifting-fuselage configuration better suited to narrowbody-sized airliners would carry 25–32% for a 6.1–8.2% increase in fuel efficiency.

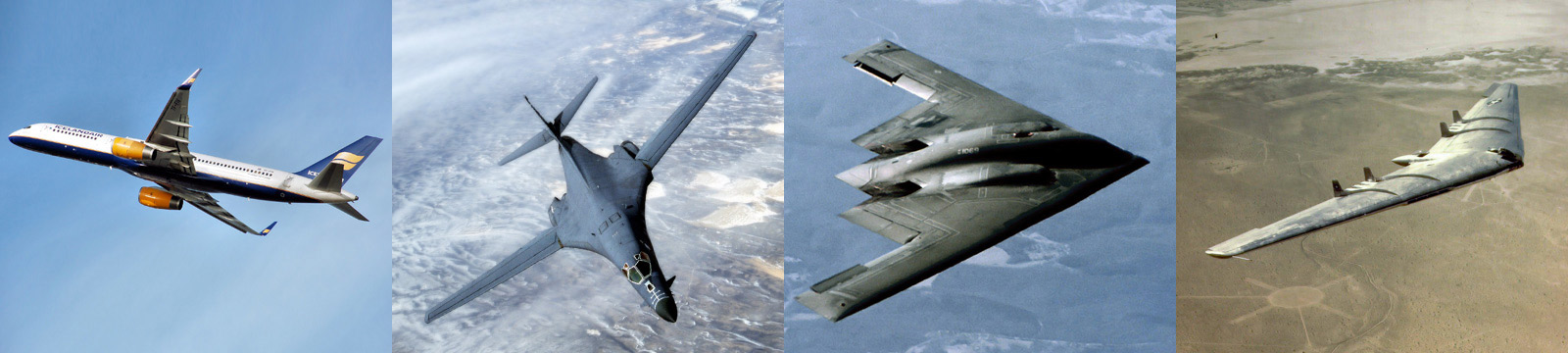
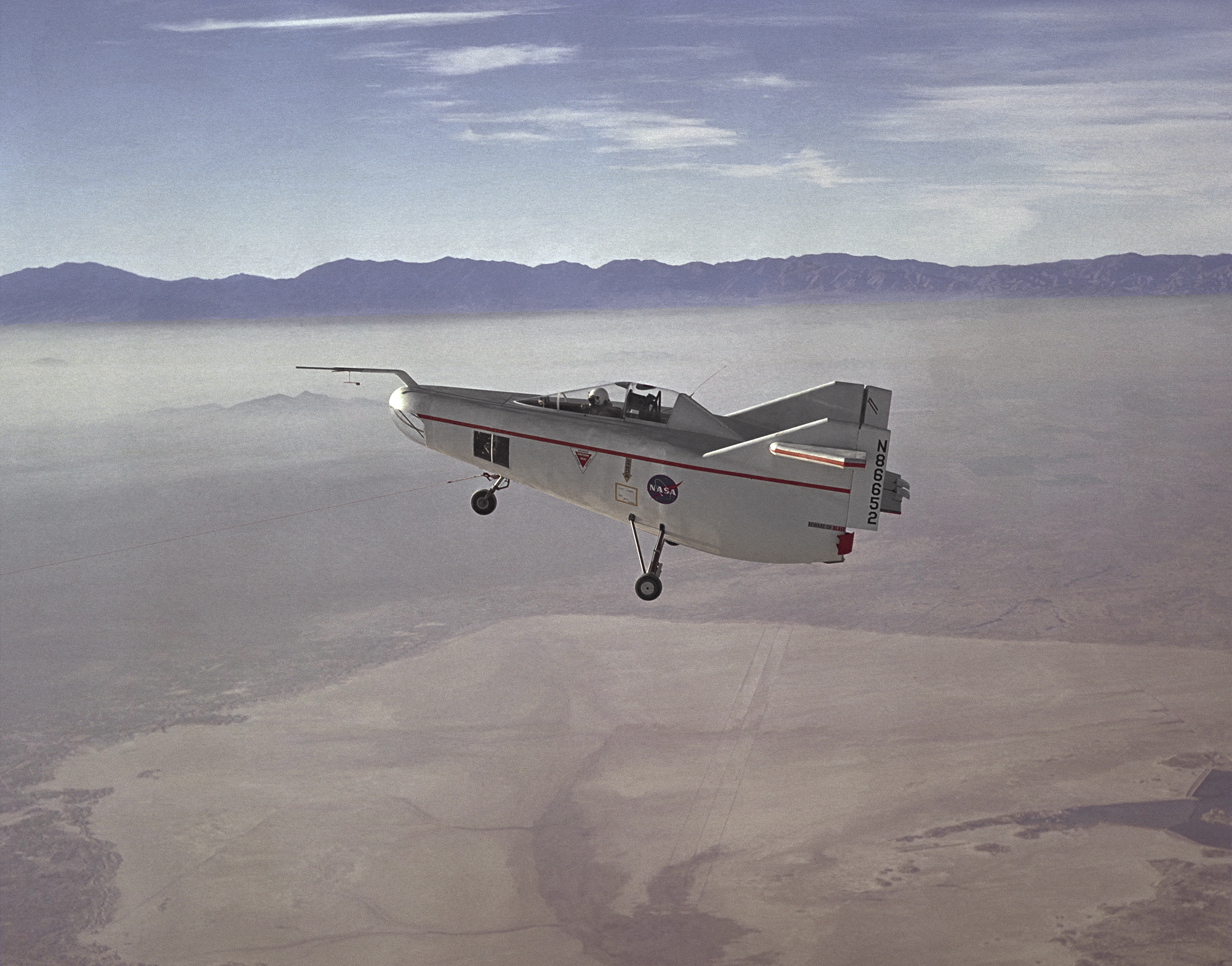
Spectrum of aircraft design concepts. From left to right: conventional airliner (Boeing 757), blended wing body (B-1 Lancer), flying wing with bulged fairings (B-2 Spirit), almost clean flying wing (Northrop YB-49), and lifting body (M2-F1).

=== Potential advantages ===
- Significant payload advantages in strategic airlift, air freight, and aerial refueling roles
- Increased fuel efficiency — 10.9% better than a conventional widebody, to over 20% than a comparable conventional aircraft. A 2022 US Air Force report shows a BWB "increases aerodynamic efficiency by at least 30% over current air force tanker and mobility aircraft".
- Lower noise — NASA audio simulations show a 15 dB reduction of Boeing 777-class aircraft, while other studies show 22–42 dB reduction below Stage 4 level, depending on configuration.

=== Potential disadvantages ===
- Evacuating within regulatory time limits in an emergency could be a challenge. Because of the aircraft's broad shape, the seating layout would be more theater than coach style, which limits the number of exit doors.
- The passenger cabin would likely be windowless, although natural light could be obtained through skylights in the cabin ceilings.
- Passengers at the edges of the cabin may feel uncomfortable during banking manoeuvres. However, passengers in wide-body conventional aircraft like the Airbus A380 may be equally susceptible.
- The center wingbox needs to be tall to be used as a passenger cabin, requiring a larger wing span to balance out.
- A BWB has more empty weight for a given payload, and may not be economical for short missions of around four or fewer hours.
- A larger wing span may be incompatible with some airport infrastructure, requiring folding wings similar to the Boeing 777X.
- It is more expensive to modify the design to create differently-sized variants compared to a conventional fuselage and wing which can be stretched or shortened easily.
- Pitch control and lift capability at low speed have presented challenges for blended-wing designs. JetZero has proposed a novel landing gear design to address these issues for its Z-5 BWB concept.

== List of blended wing body aircraft ==
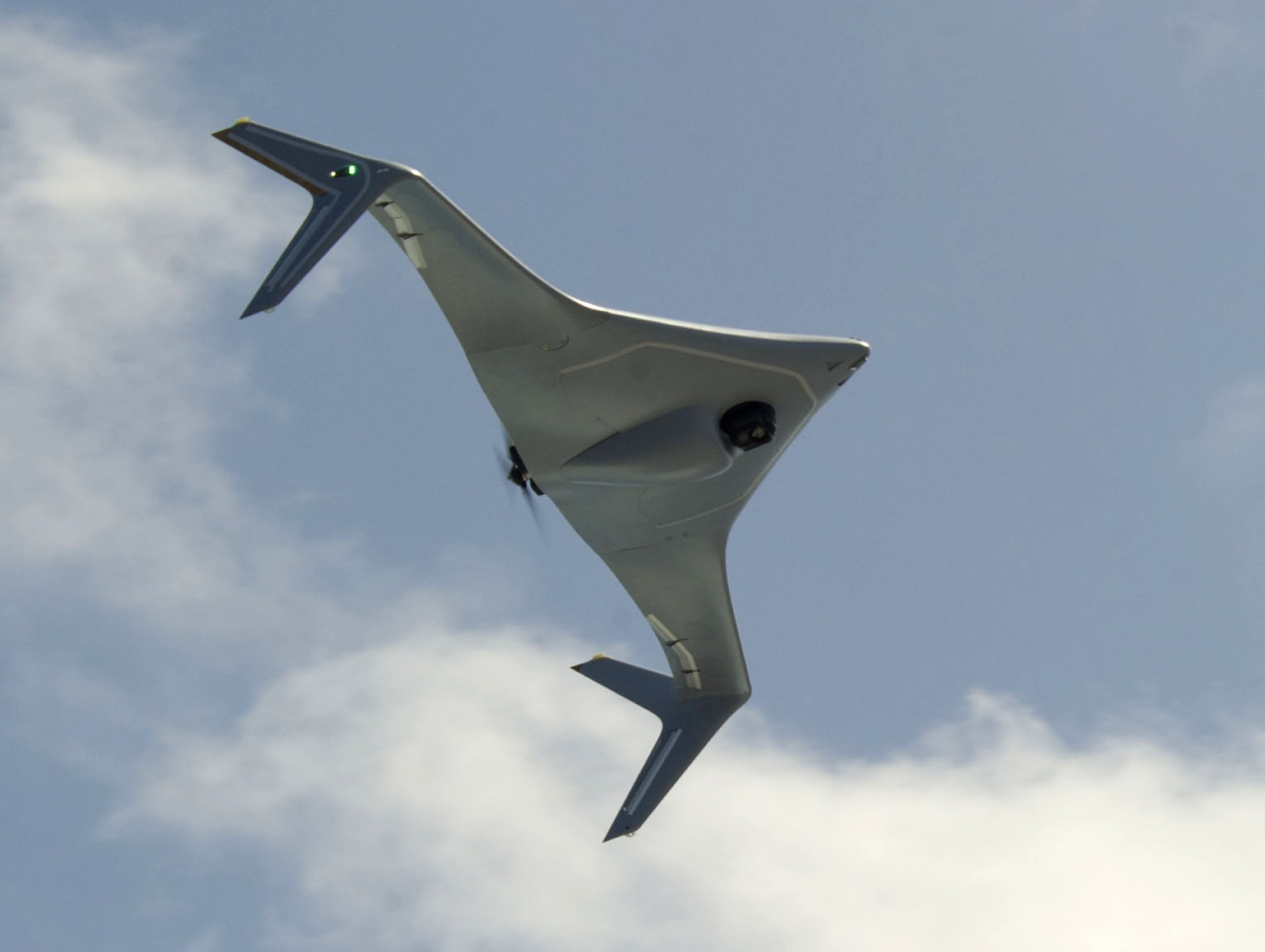
The Northrop BAT UAV in flight from below

Type	Country	Class	Role	Date	Status	No.	Notes
Airbus Maveric	Multinational	UAV	Experimental	2019	Prototype	1	
Boeing X-45	US	UAV	Experimental	2002	Prototype	2	
Boeing X-48 (C)	US	UAV	Experimental	2013	Prototype	2	Two engine
Boeing X-48 (B)	US	UAV	Experimental	2007	Prototype	2	Three engine
Lockheed A-12, M-21 and YF-12	US	Jet	Reconnaissance	1962	Production	18	YF-12 was a prototype interceptor
Lockheed SR-71 Blackbird	US	Jet	Reconnaissance	1964	Production	32	
McDonnell XP-67	US	Propeller	Fighter	1944	Prototype	1	Aerofoil profile maintained throughout.
McDonnell / NASA BWB-17	US	UAV	Experimental	1997	Prototype	1	
Miles M.30	UK	Propeller	Experimental	1942	Prototype	1	
Natilus HORIZON	US	Jet	Transport	2024	Project	0	
Natilus KONA	US	Propeller	Transport	2019	Project	0	
Northrop Grumman Bat	US	Prop/electric	Reconnaissance	2006	Production	10	
Rockwell B-1 Lancer	US	Jet	Bomber	1974	Production	104	Variable-sweep wing
Tupolev Tu-160	USSR	Jet	Bomber	1981	Production	36	Variable-sweep wing
Tupolev Tu-404	Russia	Propeller	Airliner	1991	Project	0	One of two alternatives studied
Westland Dreadnought	UK	Propeller	Transport	1924	Prototype	1	Mail plane. Aerofoil profile maintained throughout.

== In popular culture ==
=== Popular Science concept art ===
Image of the "Boeing 797" from Popular Science, 2003

A concept photo of a blended wing body commercial aircraft appeared in the November 2003 issue of Popular Science magazine. Artists Neill Blomkamp and Simon van de Lagemaat from The Embassy Visual Effects created the photo for the magazine using computer graphics software to depict the future of aviation and air travel. In 2006 the image was used in an email hoax claiming that Boeing had developed a 1000-passenger jetliner (the "Boeing 797") with a "radical Blended Wing design" and Boeing refuted the claim.

== See also ==
- Aurora D8
- Flying-V jet
- List of flying wings
- Lifting body
- Silent Aircraft Initiative, a BWB study
