= Maverick (name) =

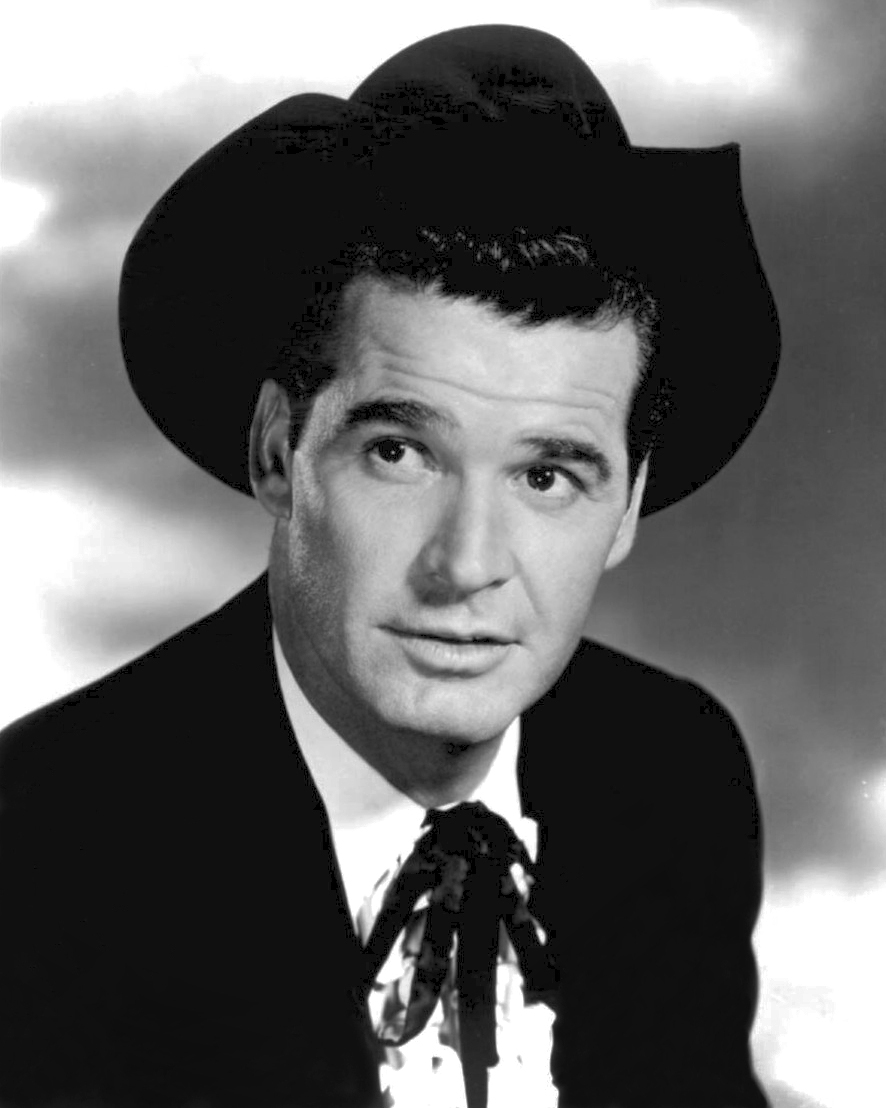
- Actor James Garner portrayed Bret Maverick in the television series Maverick.
- Gender: Unisex

Origin
- Meaning: Transferred use of British surname

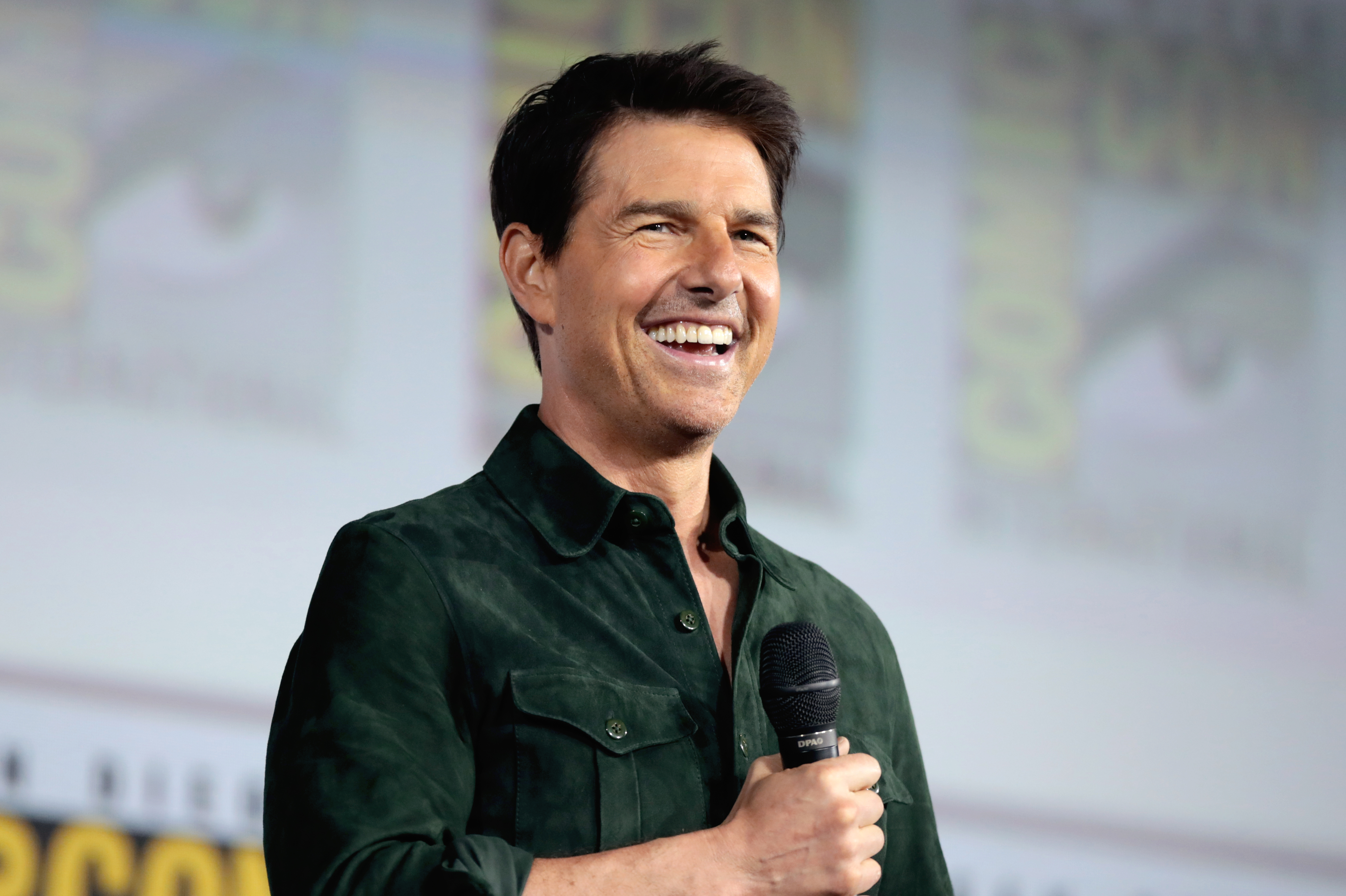
Actor Tom Cruise portrayed Pete "Maverick" Mitchell from the 1986 movie Top Gun and its 2022 sequel Top Gun: Maverick.

Maverick is both a surname and a given name that is a transferred use of the British surname. It has connotations of individuality and stubborn independence and has been popularized due to its use for movie characters such as Pete "Maverick" Mitchell from the 1986 movie Top Gun and its 2022 sequel Top Gun: Maverick, and television characters such as Bret Maverick from the 1957–1962 television series Maverick, and sports teams. A maverick is a term used for an unbranded range animal that reportedly originated with Texas financier Samuel Maverick, who neglected to brand cattle he received as repayment for a debt.

== Usage ==
The name has been among the 1,000 most-used names for boys in the United States since 1994 and among the 50 most popular names for American boys since 2020. The name is also in use for girls in the United States, though it is in greater use for boys. There were 6,962 American boys named Maverick in 2024 compared with 88 American girls. In 2022, it was the 39th most popular name given to boys in Canada.

Notable people with the name include:

== Surname ==
- Ed Maverick (born 2001), Mexican singer-songwriter
- John Maverick (1578–1636), English priest and colonist in Massachusetts
- Kurd Maverick (born Cihan Ötün), German DJ and music producer
- Mary Maverick (1818–1898), Texas pioneer and diarist
- Maury Maverick (1895–1954), US Congressman from Texas, who coined the word "gobbledygook"
- Maury Maverick Jr. (1921–2003), Texas attorney, activist, and columnist
- Moses Maverick (1611–1686), English colonist in Massachusetts
- Samuel Maverick (1803–1870), Texas pioneer and land baron from whom the term maverick originated
- Samuel Maverick Jr. (1837–1936), Texas soldier, businessman, and Alamo preservationist
- Samuel Maverick (apprentice) (died 1770), a young man killed in the Boston Massacre
- Samuel Maverick (colonist) (c. 1602 – c. 1670), English colonist in Massachusetts

== Given name ==
- Maverick Ahanmisi (born 1991), Filipino-American basketball player
- Maverick Antcliff (born 1993), Australian professional golfer
- Maverick Banes (born 1992), Australian tennis player
- Maverick Carter (born 1980), American businessman
- Maverick Eoe (born 1987), Nauruan politician
- Maverick McIvor (born 2000), American football player
- Maverick McNealy (born 1995), American professional golfer
- Maverick Morgan (born 1994), American basketball player
- Maverick Rowan (born 1996), American basketball player
- Maverick Sabre (born 1990), English singer-songwriter and rapper
- Maverick Viñales (born 1995), Spanish motorcycle racer
- Maverick Weller (born 1992), Australian rules footballer
