= Maverick =

Maverick or Maveric may refer to:

== Brands ==
- Maverick (chocolate), a discontinued chocolate bar manufactured by Nestle in the UK
- Maverick (cigarette), a brand of cigarettes manufactured by Lorillard Tobacco Company
- Mossberg Maverick, a shotgun model
- Maverick, a brand of jeans owned by VF Corporation
- Maverick REV-6, a 2005 Nerf blaster released under the N-Strike series
- Maverick, a clothing brand by Logan Paul

== Arts and media ==
=== Film and television ===
- The Maverick, a 1952 Western film starring Wild Bill Elliott
- Maverick (TV series), an American western series starring James Garner and Jack Kelly
  - Maverick (film), a 1994 film based on the television series, starring Mel Gibson, Jodie Foster, and James Garner
- Pete Mitchell (callsign "Maverick") in the Top Gun film series, played by Tom Cruise
  - Top Gun: Maverick, a 2022 sequel to the film Top Gun
- "Maverick", a 2020 episode of L.A.'s Finest, named after the 1994 film

=== Literature ===
- Maverick! (book), an autobiography by Ricardo Semler
- Maverick (comics), a comic-book imprint, series, and several characters
- Maverick (Dark Horse), a defunct imprint of Dark Horse Comics
- Maverick (magazine), a defunct South African business magazine
- Maverick, a 1990 science fiction novel by Bruce Bethke in the Isaac Asimov's Robots and Aliens series
- Maverick: Extraordinary Women from South Africa's Past, a 2005 book by Lauren Beukes
- Maverick: A Biography of Thomas Sowell, a 2021 book by Jason L. Riley

=== Music ===
==== Albums ====
- Maverick (George Thorogood and the Destroyers album), 1985
- Maverick (Hank Williams, Jr. album), 1992
- Maverick (Kizz Daniel album), 2023
- Maverick (Meg album) or the title song, 2010
- Maverick (single album), by the Boyz, or the title song, 2021
- Maverick (soundtrack), from the 1994 film
- Mavericks (Peter Holsapple and Chris Stamey album), 1991
- Mavericks, by Johnossi, 2010
- The Mavericks (1990 album), by the Mavericks
- The Mavericks (2003 album), by the Mavericks

==== Songs ====
- "Maverick" (song), by D'espairsRay, 2003
- "Mavericks", by Ubiquitous Synergy Seeker, 2010

==== Other uses in music ====
- The Mavericks, an American country music band
- Anders Lundström or Maverick, Swedish record producer and songwriter
- Fender Maverick, a guitar

=== Other uses in arts and media ===
- Maverick (Mega Man), a term to describe irregular behavior of robots in the Mega Man X video game series
- Maverick (pinball), a game based on the 1994 film
- Miss Behave's Mavericks, a Las Vegas variety show

== Organizations ==
- Maverick (company), an American entertainment company with several divisions, including Maverick Records and Maverick Films
- Maverick (management), an American music management group
- Maverick Entertainment Group, a film distributor
- Maverick Entertainment, a UK company whose productions include Snailsbury Tales
- Maverick Technologies, an American industrial automation company

== People ==
- Maverick (name), surname or given name
- Matt Bentley (born 1979), "Maverick Matt", American professional wrestler
- Smedley Butler (1881–1940), the "Maverick Marine", US Marine Corps officer
- Hossein Khalatbari (1949–1985), "Hossein the Maverick", Iranian air force pilot

== Places ==
- Maverick (MBTA station), a subway station in Boston, Massachusetts, U.S.
- Maverick County, Texas, U.S.
- Maverick Stadium, at the University of Texas at Arlington, U.S.
- Maverick Theater, a storefront theater in Fullerton, California, U.S.
- Mavericks, California, U.S., coastal location of the Mavericks surfing contest

== Sports ==
=== United States ===
==== Baseball ====
- Clermont Mavericks, a wood bat collegiate summer baseball league team in Clermont, Florida
- High Desert Mavericks, a minor league baseball team in Adelanto, California
- Mid-Missouri Mavericks, a minor league baseball team from Columbia, Missouri
- Portland Mavericks, a defunct minor league baseball team in Portland, Oregon

==== Hockey ====
- Denver Mavericks, a defunct minor league ice hockey team in Denver, Colorado
- Missouri Mavericks, a Central Hockey League team from Independence, Missouri
- Tucson Mavericks, a defunct minor league ice hockey team in Tucson, Arizona

==== School sports ====
- Colorado Mesa Mavericks, the sports teams of Colorado Mesa University
- Minnesota State Mavericks, the sports teams of Minnesota State University, Mankato
- Omaha Mavericks, the sports teams of the University of Nebraska Omaha
- UT Arlington Mavericks, the sports teams of the University of Texas at Arlington
- Mavericks, the mascot of James Madison High School, in San Antonio, Texas
- Mavericks, the mascot of Mauldin High School
- Mavericks, the mascot of McNeil High School, in Austin, Texas
- Mavericks, the mascot of Mercy College, in Dobbs Ferry, New York
- Mavericks, the mascot of Moore Catholic High School, in Staten Island, New York
- Mavericks, the mascot of Montrose School, in Medfield, Massachusetts
- Mavericks, the mascot of Moses Montefiore Academy, Chicago, Illinois
- Mavericks, the mascot of Mountainside High School in Beaverton, Oregon

==== Other sports in the US ====
- Dallas Mavericks, an NBA basketball team from Dallas, Texas
- Houston Mavericks, a defunct American Basketball Association team in Houston, Texas
- Yakima Mavericks, a minor league football team from Yakima, Washington

=== Elsewhere ===
- Calgary Mavericks, a Canadian rugby union team from Calgary, Alberta, Canada
- East Kent Mavericks, an American football club from Canterbury, England
- Mönchengladbach Mavericks, an American football club from Mönchengladbach, Germany
- Saracens Mavericks, a netball team based in Hertfordshire, England

== Technology ==
=== Computing ===
- Maverick Framework, a model-view-controller framework for Java
- Maverick Meerkat, the version 10.10 of Ubuntu
- OS X Mavericks, the tenth major release of Apple's OS X operating system

=== Vehicles ===
==== Air ====
- AEA Maverick, an Australian single-seat sportsplane design
- General Aviation Design Bureau T-32 Maverick, a Ukrainian ultralight trike design
- I-Fly Maverick, a US powered-parachute flying vehicle under development by the Indigenous People's Technology and Education Center
- Murphy Maverick, a Canadian light aircraft design
- AGM-65 Maverick, a US guided air-to-surface missile
- Airbus MAVERIC, a European sub-scale blended wing body prototype

==== Other vehicles ====
- Maverick (armored vehicle), internal armed security vehicle for Peacekeeping forces
- Ford Maverick (disambiguation), the name of five different automobiles made by the Ford Motor Company
- SS Maverick, an American oil tanker

== Other uses ==
- Maverick (animal), an unbranded range animal, derived from U.S. cattleman Samuel Maverick
- Maverick (genetics), a type of transposable genetic element also known as a polinton
- Mustang (military officer), a commissioned officer in the US military who began their career as an enlisted service member
- Maverick (roller coaster), at Cedar Point amusement park in Sandusky, Ohio, U.S.

== See also ==
- Maverik (disambiguation)
