= List of Southern Illinois University Edwardsville alumni =

Southern Illinois University Edwardsville is a public university in Edwardsville, Illinois. Following are some of its notable alumni.

== Art ==
Name	Class year	Notability	Reference(s)
Gilbert "Gib" Singleton	1967 BA	Sculptor; Fulbright Scholar; among his works is the crosier carried by Popes John Paul II, Benedict XVI, and Francis	

== Business ==
Name	Class year	Notability	Reference(s)
Fernando Aguirre	1980 BS	Former president, Chiquita Brands International	
Paul J. Galeski	1983 BS	Chairman and CEO, Maverick Technologies	
Ralph Korte	1968 BS	Chairman and former president, The Korte Company	
L.Thomas Lakin	1964 BS	Founder of The Lakin Law Firm, P.C.; Co-founder of Argosy Gaming Company and Argosy Casino Alton	
Gail Lininger	1968 BS	Co-founder and Vice-Chairman of RE/MAX	

== Education ==
Name	Class year	Notability	Reference(s)
Thelma Mothershed-Wair	1970; 1972	Educator and civil rights figure; member of the Little Rock Nine; Congressional Gold Medal recipient	
Lori Patton Davis	1995 BS	Professor, author, administrator at Ohio State University	
Timothy Pauketat	1983 BS	Archeologist, anthropologist, author, Professor of Anthropology at University of Illinois, Cahokia Mounds investigator	
Daniel A. Vallero	1974 BA; 1977 MSCRP	Author, research scientist and adjunct professor of engineering, Duke University	

== Entertainment ==
Name	Class year	Notability	Reference(s)
Roger Boyd	1997/98 BS/MS	Founding member of the rock band Head East; retired professor, SIUE Department of Social Work	
Pete Delkus	1990 BS	Meteorologist, WFAA (Dallas-Fort Worth Metroplex)	
Kathleen Madigan	1988 BA	Professional comedian	
Dale Swann	1970 BA	Deceased character actor in movies and television	
Jeff Tweedy		Lead singer of the Chicago-based band Wilco	
Stephnie Weir		Comedian and actress	

== Military and government ==
Name	Class year	Notability	Reference(s)
Walter Kross	1974 MS	Retired General, USAF; former Commander of Scott Air Force Base	
Gary Schroen	1968 BA	Former CIA agent; stationed in Iran and Afghanistan; assigned to capture Osama bin Laden; author of First In	
David C. Williams	?	Inspector General for the U.S. Postal Service, Vice Chair on the Government Accountability and Transparency Board	

== Politics ==
Name	Class year	Notability	Reference(s)
William L. Enyart	1974 BS	Former U.S. Representative for Illinois's 12th congressional district, Major General, former Illinois Adjutant General (the senior officer in the Illinois Army and Air National Guard)	
Thomas Holbrook	1971 BA	Former Illinois State Representative, 113th District	
John W Hursey Jr	2014 BA	American Political Figure and Educator	
JD Leathers	2015 BS	Former Public Policy Advisor, Brentwood, MO; Former Traffic Commissioner, Webster Groves, MO; American Polymath; 2022 Democratic Candidate for Missouri's 4th congressional district	
Andy Manar	1997 BA	Illinois State Senate, 48th District	
Deborah Pauly	1988	Orange Country Republican politician, John Birch Society leader, and Tea Party personality	
Ed Schieffer	1977 MSEd	Member of the Missouri House of Representatives, 11th District	
John Shimkus	1997 MBA	R-IL 19th District, U.S. House of Representatives	
Mark Waller	1992 BS	Minority leader, Colorado House of Representatives representing District 15	

== Sports ==
Name	Class year	Notability	Reference(s)
Mike Banner		Central midfielder for the Finnish Premier League side FF Jaro	
Justin Bilyeu	2016 BS	Defender, New York Red Bulls; 18th pick, 2016 MLS SuperDraft	
Jenny Bindon		Goalkeeper for the New Zealand Women's Football Team at the 2007 & 2011 FIFA Women's World Cup and the 2008 Beijing & 2012 London Summer Olympics	
John Carenza		professional soccer player with the St. Louis Stars and member of the 1972 U.S. Olympic Team	
Alicia DeShasier	2007 BS	Won gold medal in javelin at the 2011 Pan American Games	
Juan Farrow		3-time NCAA Division II tennis singles champion; 2-time Division II doubles champion	
Ken Flach		2-time Wimbledon and US Open doubles winner; Olympic gold medalist; 3-time NCAA Division II tennis singles champion, Division I doubles finalist; 2-time Division II doubles champion	
Pat Healy		Professional mixed martial artist, formerly for the Ultimate Fighting Championship and Maximum Fighting Championship welterweight champion	
Darin Hendrickson	1992/95 BS/MA	College baseball coach at Fontbonne, Central Missouri, and Saint Louis	
Jalen Henry		Professional basketball player	
Edward E. "Ed" Hightower	1974/77/81 BS/MSEd/SD	Division I men's basketball referee, officiated 12 NCAA Final Four tournaments; Superintendent of Edwardsville School District 7; former member, SIU Board of Trustees	
Neil Magny		Professional mixed martial artist, current UFC Welterweight	
Ty Margenthaler	1997	Former head coach of the Southeast Missouri State University Redhawks women's basketball team	
Bill Plaschke	1980	Sports writer for the LA Times and a regular on ESPN's Around the Horn	
Matt Polster	2015 BS	Midfielder and defender, Chicago Fire and U.S. national soccer team; 7th pick, 2015 MLS SuperDraft; finalist, 2016 Major League Soccer Rookie of the Year	
Joe Reiniger	1994 BS	Retired St. Louis Steamers and Ambush soccer player	
Robert Seguso		2-time Wimbledon and US-Open doubles winner; Olympic gold medalist; NCAA Division II tennis doubles champion and Division I doubles finalist	
Dewayne Staats	1975 BA	Television sports commentator for the Tampa Bay Rays	
Dennis Werth		Former Major League Baseball first baseman and outfielder	
Paul Wight		Professional wrestler and actor, known as "The Big Show"	
Clay Zavada	2007	Major League Baseball Relief Pitcher and 2009 Robert Goulet Memorial Mustached American of the Year award from the American Mustache Institute	

== Writing and journalist ==
Name	Class year	Notability	Reference(s)
Gary W. Kronk	1981 BS	Noted amateur astronomer and journalist	
Paige St. John	1986 BS	Reporter for the Sarasota Herald-Tribune, won the 2011 Pulitzer Prize for Investigative Reporting	
Shelby Steele	1971 MA	Author and Research Fellow at the Hoover Institution of Stanford University; awarded the 2006 Bradley Prize and the 2004 National Humanities Medal; News & Documentary Emmy Award for documentary writing	
Kola Tubosun	2012 MA	Nigerian Linguist, writer, 2016 awardee of the Premio Ostana in Cuneo, Italy for work in indigenous language advocacy, and author of Edwardsville by Heart (2018).	
