= Process optimization =

Series of actions for bettering effective usage

Process optimization is the discipline of adjusting a process so as to make the best or most effective use of some specified set of parameters without violating some constraint. Common goals are minimizing cost and maximizing throughput and/or efficiency. Process optimization is one of the major quantitative tools in industrial decision making.

When optimizing a process, the goal is to maximize one or more of the process specifications, while keeping all others within their constraints. This can be done by using a process mining tool, discovering the critical activities and bottlenecks, and acting only on them.

== Areas ==
Fundamentally, there are three parameters that can be adjusted to affect optimal performance. They are:

- Equipment optimization

The first step is to verify that the existing equipment is being used to its fullest advantage by examining operating data to identify equipment bottlenecks.

- Operating procedures

Operating procedures may vary widely from person to person or from shift to shift. Automation of the plant can help significantly. But automation will be of no help if the operators take control and run the plant manually.

- Control optimization

In a typical processing plant, such as a chemical plant or oil refinery, there are hundreds or even thousands of control loops. Each control loop is responsible for controlling one part of the process, such as maintaining a temperature, level, or flow.

If the control loop is not properly designed and tuned, the process runs below its optimum. The process will be more expensive to operate, and equipment will wear out prematurely. For each control loop to run optimally, identification of sensor, valve, and tuning problems is important. It has been well documented that over 35% of control loops typically have problems.

The process of continuously monitoring and optimizing the entire plant is sometimes called performance supervision.

== Advanced control and real-time optimization ==
Advanced process control methods can effectively utilize multiple process variables and constraints rather than treating each control loop separately. Model predictive control, for example, uses a dynamic process model to predict process behavior and to determine optimized control actions within defined operating limits.

Real-time optimization generally operates above the basic regulatory control layer. It uses real-time process measurements, digital twin models, operating constraints and an economic objective to calculate improved operating targets. These targets may be then downloaded to advanced control system or presented to plant operators.

The accuracy of an optimization result depends on the quality of the measurements and on how closely the model represents the actual plant. Changes in feed composition, equipment condition, instrument performance or operating mode can cause differences between predicted and actual process behavior.

== Process measurements and online analysis ==
Process optimization commonly uses measurements such as temperature, pressure, flow, level, physical properties and chemical composition. In chemical plants and oil refineries, on-line process analyzers provide continuous real-time measurements of process streams, enabling physical properties and chemical composition parameters that are traditionally determined by laboratory analysis to be monitored continuously and used directly for process control and optimization.

Where a property cannot be measured continuously, a soft sensor may estimate it from other available process measurements. Soft sensors can use physical models, statistical relationships or machine-learning methods. Their accuracy may decrease when process conditions move outside the range, which was included in the mathematical model.

Online measurements can reduce the delay between a process change and the availability of quality information. Their usefulness depends on correct installation, calibration, maintenance, response time and whether the measured sample is truly representative.

== Crude distillation optimization ==
In oil refinery, process optimization may be effectively applied to atmospheric crude distillation unit to improve distillation performance by combining artificial intelligence, deep reinforcement learning and real-time crude oil analysis.. Changes in crude oil properties can affect furnace duty, column temperature profiles, product cut points and separation performance.

Process measurements, simulation models, and advanced control can be used together to adjust operating conditions as the feedstock quality and production requirements change. The economic optimum may reflect product yields, energy costs, equipment limitations, product quality specifications and environmental constraints.

Deep reinforcement learning can be applied to CDU optimization by allowing an AI agent to evaluate operating actions against defined performance goals. These goals may include increasing valuable distillate yield, reducing energy consumption, maintaining product specifications, improving crude switch stability or achieving the best overall economic operating point.

== See also ==
- Advanced process control
- Atmospheric distillation of crude oil
- Calculation of glass properties, optimization of several properties
- Deficit irrigation to optimize water productivity
- Industrial engineering
- Model predictive control
- Oil refinery
- Process control
- Process mining
- Process simulation
- Soft sensor
- Taguchi methods
- Workforce productivity
