= X48 =

X-48 may refer to:

- Boeing X-48, an experimental unmanned aerial vehicle
- Intel X48, a chipset for Intel Core 2 processors
- x48, hexadecimal value for the ASCII character 'H' (Numeric character reference)
