= Maverick (comics) =

In comic books, Maverick may refer to:

- Maverick (Dark Horse), a comics imprint of Dark Horse Comics
- Maverick (G.I. Joe), a fictional character in the G.I. Joe universe
- Maverick (Marvel Comics), a fictional character who appeared in the X-Men comics
- An alias of the fictional character Chris Bradley (comics) in the X-Men comics
- The Mavericks (comics), the New Mexico team of the Fifty State Initiative in Marvel Comics
- Maverick, a 1959 Dell Comics series based on the Maverick TV series

== See also ==
- Maverick (disambiguation)
