= Maverik =

Maverik may refer to:

- Maverik, Inc., a convenience store chain owned by FJ Management
- Maverik Lacrosse, an American lacrosse equipment and apparel company
- Maverik Center, indoor arena in West Valley City, Utah, U.S., named for Maverik, Inc.
- Maverik Stadium, stadium at Utah State University in Logan, Utah, U.S., also named for Maverik, Inc.

== See also ==
- Maverick (disambiguation)
