= Maury Maverick =

American politician (1895–1954)

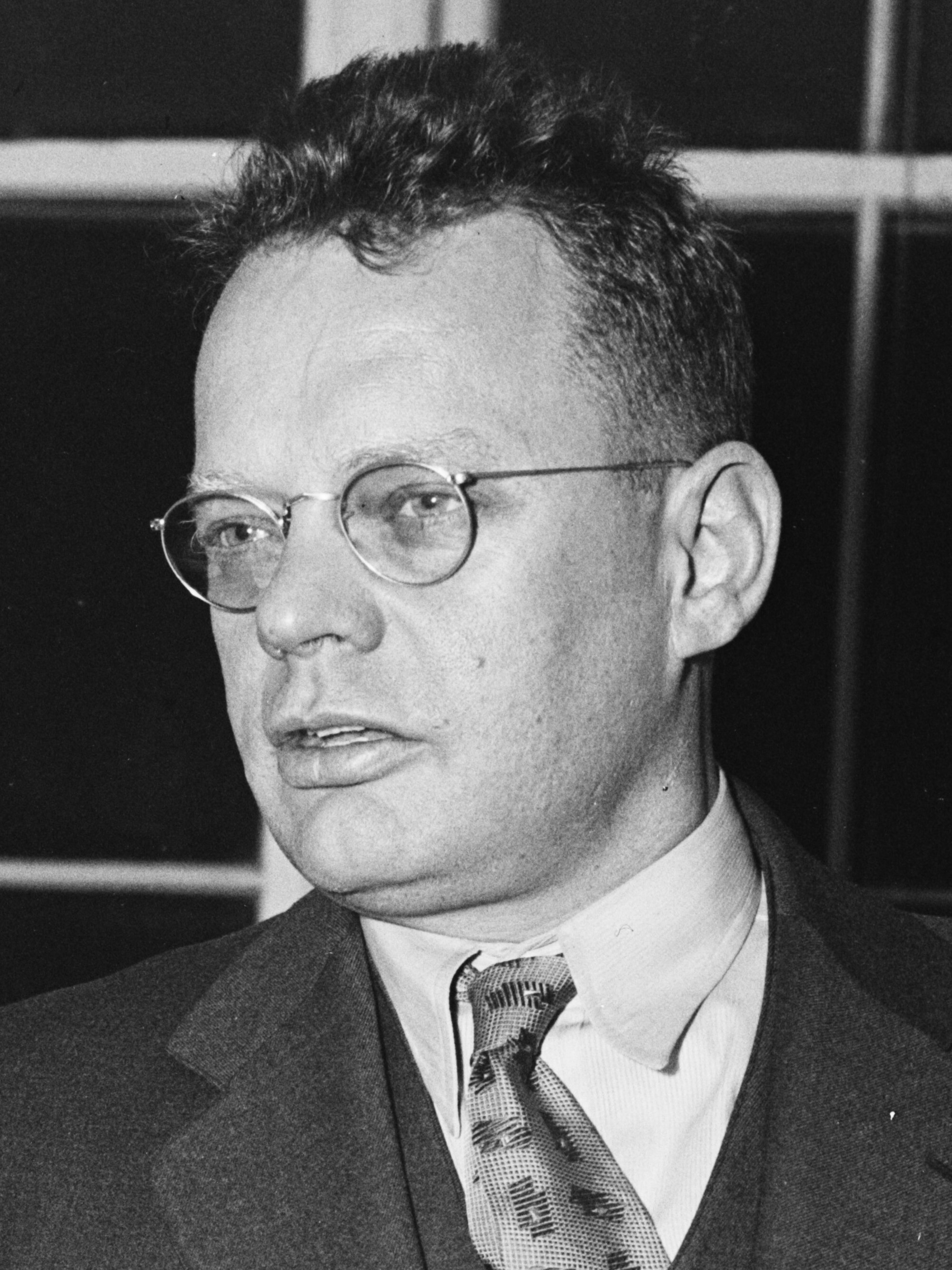
- Maverick in 1936

159th Mayor of San Antonio
- In office 1939–1941
- Preceded by: C. K. Quin
- Succeeded by: C. K. Quin

Member of the U.S. House of Representatives from Texas's 20th district
- In office January 3, 1935 – January 3, 1939
- Preceded by: District created
- Succeeded by: Paul J. Kilday

Personal details
- Born: Fontaine Maury Maverick; October 23, 1895 San Antonio, Texas, U.S.
- Died: June 7, 1954 (aged 58)
- Party: Democratic
- Children: Maury Jr.Terrell Fontaine
- Relatives: Samuel Maverick (grandfather); Mary Adams (grandmother)
- Education: University of Texas, Austin
- Occupation: Attorney

Military service
- Allegiance: United States
- Branch/service: United States Army
- Years of service: 1917–1919
- Rank: First Lieutenant
- Unit: Infantry Branch
- Battles/wars: World War I

Fontaine Maury Maverick Sr. (October 23, 1895 – June 7, 1954) was an American politician. A member of the Democratic Party, he served in the United States House of Representatives for Texas's 20th congressional district from 1935 to 1939. He is best remembered for his independence from the party and for coining the term "gobbledygook" for obscure and euphemistic bureaucratic language.

== Background ==
Maverick was born in San Antonio, Texas, the son of Albert and Jane Lewis (Maury) Maverick. His paternal grandparents were Samuel Maverick, one of the signers of the Texas Declaration of Independence and the source of the word maverick, and Mary Ann Adams Maverick. He studied at Texas Military Institute, the Virginia Military Institute, and the University of Texas. Maverick was a descendent of Samuel Maverick, one of the earliest settlers of Massachusetts, one of the largest original land owners, and the first to bring slaves to Massachusetts.

== Career ==
=== Early years ===
Maverick was admitted to the bar in 1916 and practiced law in San Antonio. He was a first lieutenant in the infantry in World War I and earned the Silver Star and the Purple Heart. He served with the 28th Infantry Regiment, part of the 1st Division, and was involved in the Meuse–Argonne offensive.

In the 1920s, he was involved in the lumber and mortgage businesses.

=== Government service ===
From 1929 to 1931, he was the elected tax collector for Bexar County.

He was elected to the Seventy-fourth Congress in 1934, with support from the Hispanic population of his district, and re-elected in 1936 to the Seventy-fifth. During his 1934 campaign, Maverick enlisted Lyndon Johnson, a then little-known congressional secretary, to work for him during the Democratic primary. In the House, he was an ardent champion of Franklin Delano Roosevelt's New Deal. He angered the conservative Democrats running the party back in Texas, including John Nance Garner.

Maverick was the sole Texas Democrat to vote for the Anti-Lynching Bill of 1937.

A split between FDR and Vice President John Nance Garner over Supreme Court reorganization put Congressman Maverick in an extremely weakened position, leaving him unable to fund his reelection, which led to his defeat in the primary for a third term in 1938. This was primarily accomplished at the direction of Garner's conservative allies in the district. Maverick returned to Texas where he was elected Mayor of San Antonio, again with support from minority voters, serving from 1939 to 1941. In the subsequent election, he was labeled a Communist and defeated. Lyndon Johnson, future President, was running for the Senate and secretly made a pact with Maverick's enemies: Johnson would help defeat Maverick if Maverick's enemies would back Johnson for Senate. During World War II, he worked for the Office of Price Administration and the Office of Personnel Management, and served on the War Production Board and the Smaller War Plants Corporation.

While serving at the Smaller War Plants Corporation he sent a message to his staff telling them

Memoranda should be as short as clearness will allow ... Put the subject matter—the point—and even the conclusion in the opening paragraph and the whole story on one page ... Stay off the gobbledygook language. It only fouls people up ...

=== Later years ===
After the war, he practiced law in San Antonio.

== Personal life, and death ==
Maverick was a cousin of congressmen Abram Poindexter Maury and John W. Fishburne of Virginia and nephew of congressman James Luther Slayden of Texas, who married Ellen (Maury) at a Maury home called Piedmont in Charlottesville, Virginia, now part of the University of Virginia. They are related to Matthew Fontaine Maury, Dabney Herndon Maury, and the early and prominent Fontaine, Dabney, Brooke, Minor, Mercer, Herndon, Slaughter, and Slayden families of Virginia, Tennessee, and Texas.

He married Terrell Louise Dobbs and had a daughter and a son, San Antonio newspaper editorialist Maury Maverick, Jr. (who died in 2003 at the age of 82). Terrell Fontaine "Terrellita" Maverick who died in 2021 at the age of 95.

Maverick died on June 7, 1954. His widow later married the distinguished Texas author and historian Walter Prescott Webb.

== Notes ==
U.S. House of Representatives
Preceded by District created	Member of the U.S. House of Representatives from Texas's 20th congressional district 1935–1939	Succeeded by Paul J. Kilday
Political offices
Preceded by C.K. Quin	Mayor of San Antonio, Texas; 1939–1941	Succeeded by C.K. Quin
