= Paul J. Kilday =

American judge and congressman (1900–1968)

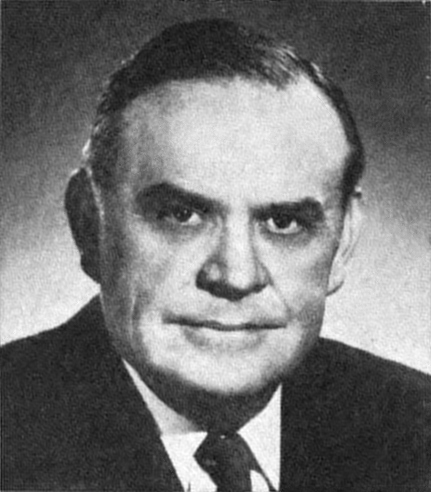
- Kilday, c. 1961

Member of the U.S. House of Representatives from Texas's 20th district
- In office January 3, 1939 – September 24, 1961
- Preceded by: Maury Maverick
- Succeeded by: Henry B. González

Judge of the United States Court of Military Appeals
- In office September 24, 1961 – October 12, 1968
- Preceded by: George W. Latimer
- Succeeded by: William H. Darden

Personal details
- Born: March 29, 1900 Sabinal, Texas, U.S.
- Died: October 12, 1968 (aged 68) Washington, D.C., U.S.
- Party: Democratic
- Spouse: Cecile Newton (m. 1932)
- Children: 2
- Parents: Patrick Kilday (father); Mary Tallant (mother)
- Education: St. Mary's University, Texas
- Occupation: Lawyer; politician

Paul Joseph Kilday (March 29, 1900 – October 12, 1968) was a Democratic member of the United States House of Representatives from Texas, representing the 20th district from January 3, 1939, to September 24, 1961, before serving as a Judge of the United States Court of Military Appeals.

== Early life and education ==
Born in Sabinal, Texas, Kilday was the sixth child of Patrick Kilday, an immigrant from Ireland who was established as a merchant, and his Texas-born wife, Mary Tallant Kilday.

Kilday moved with his parents and siblings to San Antonio in 1904. He attended public and parochial schools there, graduating in 1918, and then went on to St. Mary's University in the same city.

While attending law school, Kilday was employed as a clerk for the United States Air Force in Washington, D.C. from 1918 to 1921 and as a law clerk for United States Shipping Board Emergency Fleet Corporation, in 1921 and 1922. He graduated with an LL.B. degree from the law department of Georgetown University, Washington, D.C., in 1922. He was admitted to the bar the same year and commenced practice in San Antonio, Texas. At one point, he went into practice with Harry Howard, who later became a judge and president of the San Antonio Bar Association.

Kilday himself served as first assistant district attorney of Bexar County, Texas from 1935 to 1938. He was elected by the Twentieth District of Texas as a Democrat to the Seventy-sixth and to the eleven succeeding Congresses and served from January 3, 1939, until his resignation September 24, 1961, having been appointed a judge of the United States Court of Military Appeals by President John F. Kennedy. He served in this capacity until his death, in Washington, D.C. He was succeeded in Congress by Henry Barbosa Gonzalez. He was buried at Arlington National Cemetery, in Arlington, Virginia.

He was one of the majority of the Texan delegation to decline to sign the 1956 Southern Manifesto opposing the desegregation of public schools ordered by the Supreme Court in Brown v. Board of Education. Kilday voted against the Civil Rights Act of 1957 but in favor of the Civil Rights Act of 1960.

== Family ==
Kilday wed Cecile Newton on August 9, 1932. He died on October 12, 1968, at Washington Hospital Center, apparently of a heart attack. His widow survived him, as did two daughters, Mary Catherine Kilday and Betty Ann Kilday Drogula, and two granddaughters, Cynthia L. Drogula and Jennifer M. Drogula. Two additional grandchildren followed his death, Fred K. Drogula and Elizabeth A. Drogula.

== Sources ==
=== General resource ===
- United States Congress. "Paul J. Kilday (id: K000171)". Biographical Directory of the United States Congress.

U.S. House of Representatives
Preceded by Maury Maverick	Member of the U.S. House of Representatives from Texas's 20th congressional district January 3, 1939 – September 24, 1961	Succeeded by Henry B. González
