= Maury Maverick Jr. =

American politician (1921–2003)

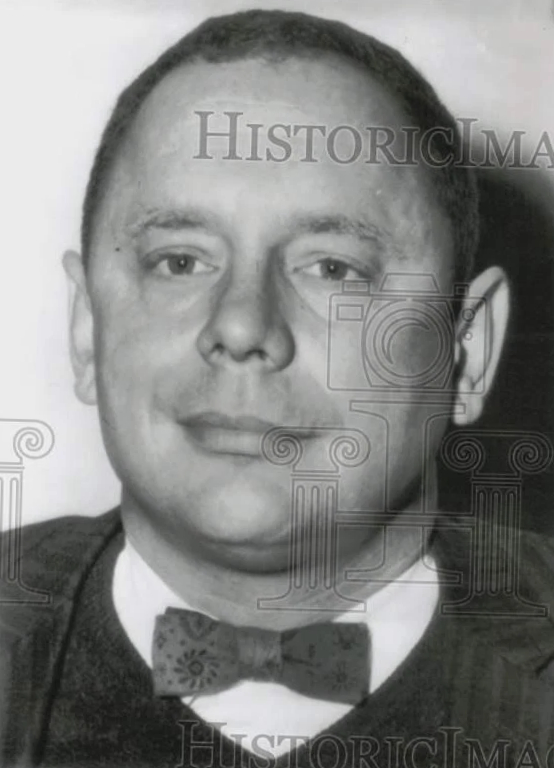
- Maverick in 1960

Member of the Texas House of Representatives
- In office January 9, 1951 – January 8, 1957
- Preceded by: Constituency established
- Succeeded by: Joe Lee Hensley
- Constituency: District 78–2 (1951–53); District 68-2 (1953–57)

Personal details
- Born: Fontaine Maury Maverick Jr. January 3, 1921
- Died: January 28, 2003 (aged 82)
- Party: Democratic
- Spouse: Julia Orynski Maverick
- Parent: Maury Maverick (father)

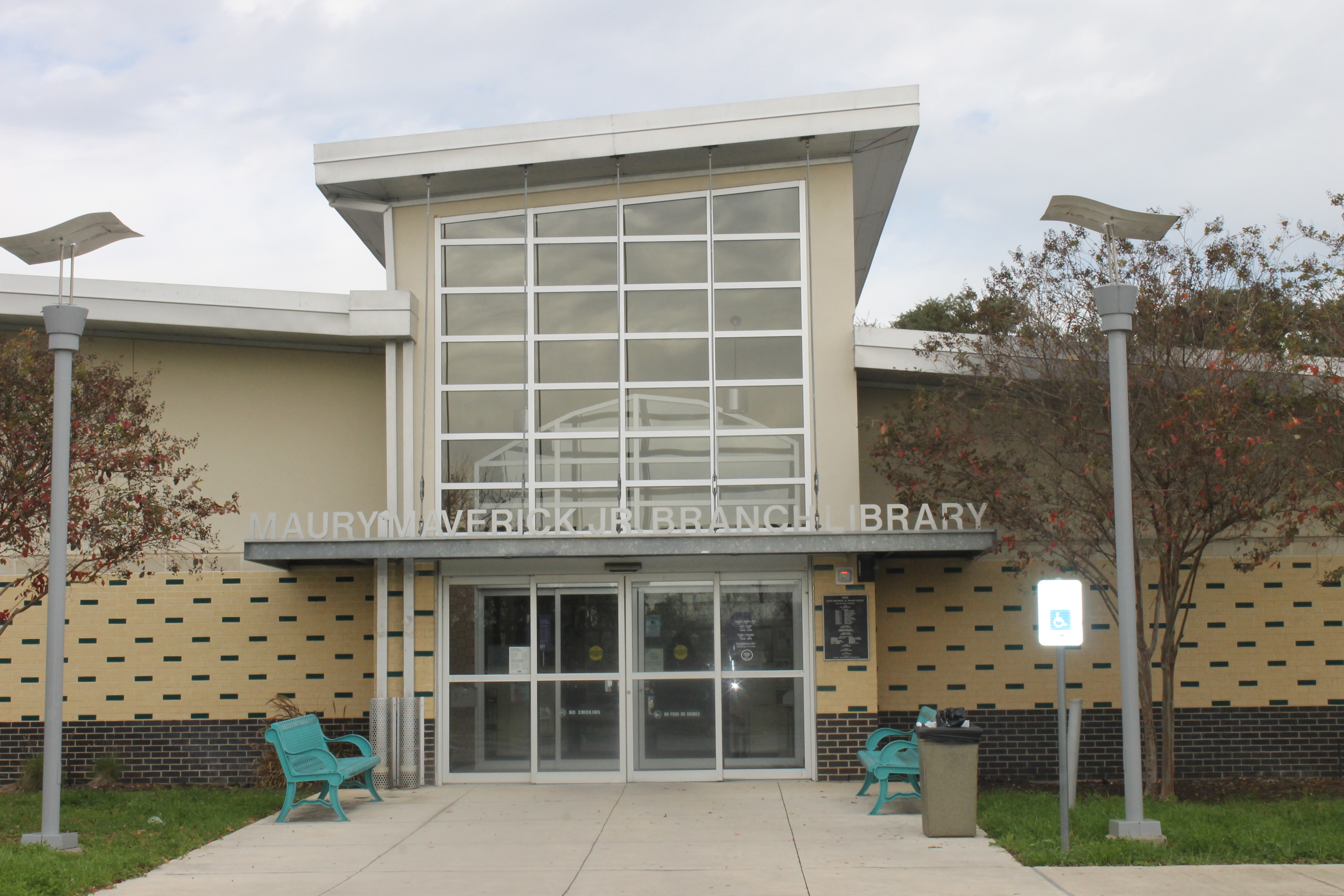
The Maury Maverick Jr. Library at 8700 Mystic Park in San Antonio, Texas, opened in 2006. It is accessible from Bandera Road.

Fontaine Maury Maverick Jr. (January 3, 1921 – January 28, 2003) was an American lawyer, politician, activist, and columnist from the U.S. state of Texas. A member of the prominent Maverick family, he was the great-grandson of Samuel Maverick, the rancher who signed the Texas Declaration of Independence and famously refused to brand his cattle, and the son of Maury Maverick Sr., a two-term member of the United States House of Representatives.

== Career ==
After graduating from the Texas Military Institute in 1938 and receiving a bachelor's degree in economics in 1942 from another institution, he served in the Marine Corps during World War II, serving in the Quartermaster Corps and eventually seeing action in the Pacific Theater of Operations. At the end of the war, Maverick returned to San Antonio, where he earned a law degree at St. Mary's University in 1949.

The next year, Maverick was elected to the Texas House of Representatives as a Democrat. A committed liberal, he became well known during his term in office as a supporter of organized labor and civil rights for African Americans and an opponent of the persecution of suspected communists during the Red Scare. In one incident, he killed a bill to sentence convicted communists to the death penalty by inserting a poison pill amendment to sentence those who were only suspected of communism to life imprisonment. In 1956, he chose not to run for a fourth term.

In 1961, Maverick made his last run for elective office, campaigning (along with seventy other Democrats) in a special election for the United States Senate seat vacated by Vice President Lyndon B. Johnson. With the support of the Texas AFL-CIO, he ran fourth out of the five major Democratic candidates, with 10 percent of the vote, behind appointee Senator William Blakley (18 percent), future House Speaker Jim Wright (16 percent), and State Attorney General Will Wilson (11.5 percent), but ahead of State Senator Henry B. Gonzalez (9 percent). Having split the liberal vote, thus allowing the conservative Blakley to make the runoff against Republican John Tower (who received 31 percent in the initial round and was narrowly elected in the runoff), Maverick and Gonzalez, a friend and fellow San Antonian, stopped speaking to one another for almost the next twenty years.

After leaving the House, Maverick became an attorney for the American Civil Liberties Union, representing civil rights protestors, atheists, communists, and, during the Vietnam War, conscientious objectors and draft protestors. In 1964, in Stanford v. Texas, he represented John W. Stanford Jr., a bookstore owner and Communist Party USA member convicted of sedition for selling books authored by Karl Marx, Jean-Paul Sartre, Pope John XXIII, and Supreme Court Associate Justice Hugo Black. The case was eventually heard before the Supreme Court (including Black) and became a landmark free speech case. Another notable Maverick client was world-famous atheist Madalyn Murray O'Hair.

After marrying painter Julia Orynski in 1966, Maverick began to ease himself away from the active practice of law and began to support himself by writing editorials for various newspapers. In 1980, he gave up law completely and began writing a regular Sunday column for the San Antonio Express-News. He continued writing the column for the next twenty-three years. He focused on a variety of subjects, most of which generated considerable controversy, such as his advocacy for the Palestinian people in the Israeli–Palestinian conflict and his tribute to Montana Congresswoman Jeannette Rankin, the only member of Congress to vote against entry into both World War I and World War II. His friend and occasional column subject, former state senator A.R. Schwartz, called him "one of the last of the red-hot liberals." In 1991, the American Bar Association awarded him the John Minor Wisdom Public Interest and Professional Award for his handling of more than 300 pro bono legal clients during his career. (Wisdom was a liberal Republican from New Orleans who was appointed to the federal bench by U.S. President Dwight D. Eisenhower.) In 1997, a selection of some of Maverick's more than one thousand columns was published in a book titled Texas Iconoclast.

== Death and legacy ==
In mid-January 2003, Maverick filed his last column, which condemned the imminent Iraq War as "unjust," and entered a local hospital to be treated for kidney disease. He died there on January 28, at the age of 82. A public library in his hometown of San Antonio is named for him.

Preceded by Eugene C. Williams	Member of the Texas House of Representatives from District 78-2 (San Antonio); 1951–1953	Succeeded by Obsolete district
Preceded by New district	Member of the Texas House of Representatives from District 68-2 (San Antonio); 1953–1957	Succeeded by Joe Lee Hensley
