= Boeing X-48 =

Airplane

X-48
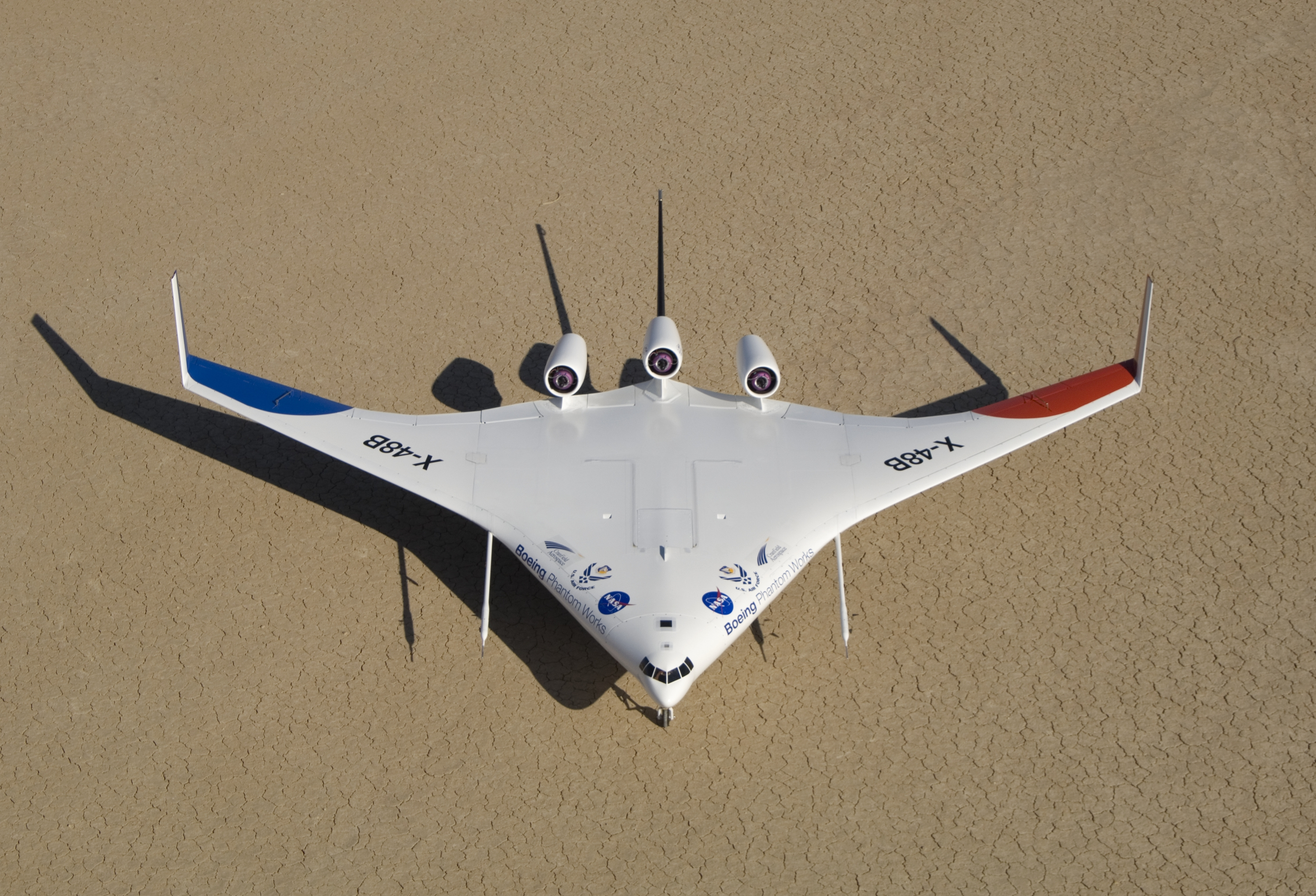
- X-48B

General information
- Type: Experimental unmanned aerial vehicle
- Manufacturer: Boeing
- Status: Retired

History
- Manufactured: 2
- First flight: July 20, 2007

The Boeing X-48 is an American experimental unmanned aerial vehicle (UAV) built to investigate the characteristics of blended wing body (BWB) aircraft. Boeing designed the X-48 and two examples were built by Cranfield Aerospace in the UK. Boeing began flight testing the X-48B version for NASA in 2007. The X-48B was later modified into the X-48C version, which was flight tested from August 2012 to April 2013. Boeing and NASA planned to develop a larger BWB demonstrator, although no updates have been provided since 2013.

== Design and development ==
=== Background ===
Boeing had in the past studied a blended wing body design, but found that passengers did not like the theater-like configuration of the mock-up; the design was dropped for passenger airliners, but retained for military aircraft such as aerial refueling tankers. (Note: Quote: Boeing once toyed with a blended wing-body, a sort of flying wing, to produce significantly better aerodynamics and fuel efficiency. Passengers would have sat in a wide cabin, rather like a small amphitheater. But tests with a mock-up produced such a negative reaction that the company dropped the technology, except for military refueling aircraft.)

McDonnell Douglas developed the blended wing concept in the late 1990s, and Boeing presented it during an annual Joint AIAA/ASME/SAE/ASEA Propulsion Conference in 2004. The McDonnell Douglas engineers believed their design had several advantages, but their concept, code named "Project Redwood", found little favor at Boeing after their 1997 merger. The most difficult problem they solved was that of ensuring passengers a safe and fast escape in case of an accident, since emergency door locations were completely different from those in a conventional aircraft.

The blended wing body (BWB) concept offers advantages in structural, aerodynamic and operating efficiencies over today's more conventional fuselage-and-wing designs. These features translate into greater range, fuel economy, reliability and life cycle savings, as well as lower manufacturing costs. They also allow for a wide variety of potential military and commercial applications. These advantages are achieved at the expense of a multitude of disadvantages that make the concept impractical for airline use.

=== X-48 ===
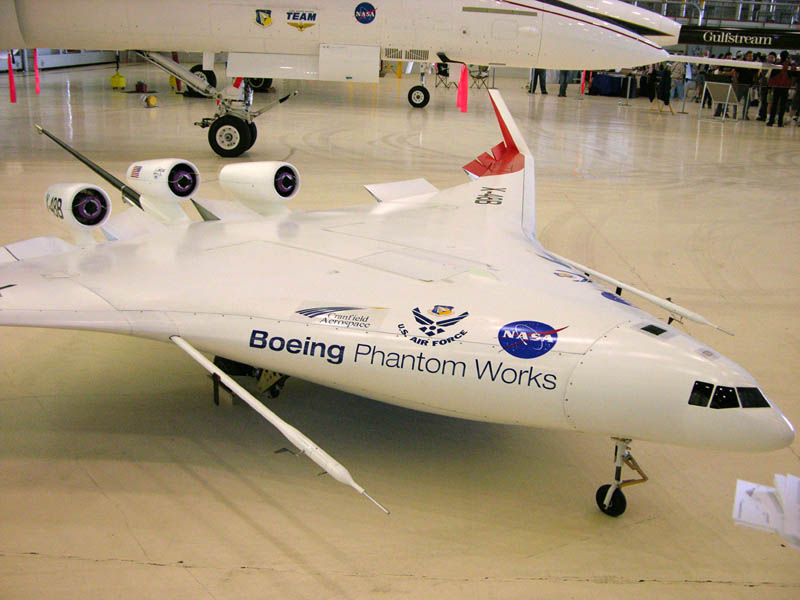
X-48B on static display at the 2006 Edwards Airshow

Boeing Phantom Works developed the blended wing body (BWB) aircraft concept in cooperation with the NASA Langley Research Center. In an initial effort to study the flight characteristics of the BWB design, a remote-controlled propeller-driven blended wing body model with a 17 ft (5.2 m) wingspan was flown in 1997. The next step was to fly the 35 ft (10.7 m) wide X-48A in 2004, but the program was canceled before manufacturing.

Research at Phantom Works then focused on a new model, designated X-48B, two examples were built by United Kingdom-based Cranfield Aerospace, a division of Cranfield University. Norman Princen, Boeing's chief engineer for the project, stated in 2006: "Earlier wind-tunnel testing and the upcoming flight testing are focused on learning more about the BWB's low-speed flight-control characteristics, especially during takeoffs and landings. Knowing how accurately our models predict these characteristics is an important step in the further development of this concept."

The X-48B had a 21-foot (6.4 m) wingspan, weighs 392 pounds (178 kg), and was built from composite materials. It was powered by three small turbojet engines and was expected to fly at up to 120 kn (220 km/h) and reach an altitude of 10,000 feet (3,000 m). The X-48B was an 8.5% scaled version of a conceptual 240 feet (73 m) span design. Though passenger versions of the X-48B have been proposed, the design has a higher probability of first being used for a military transport.

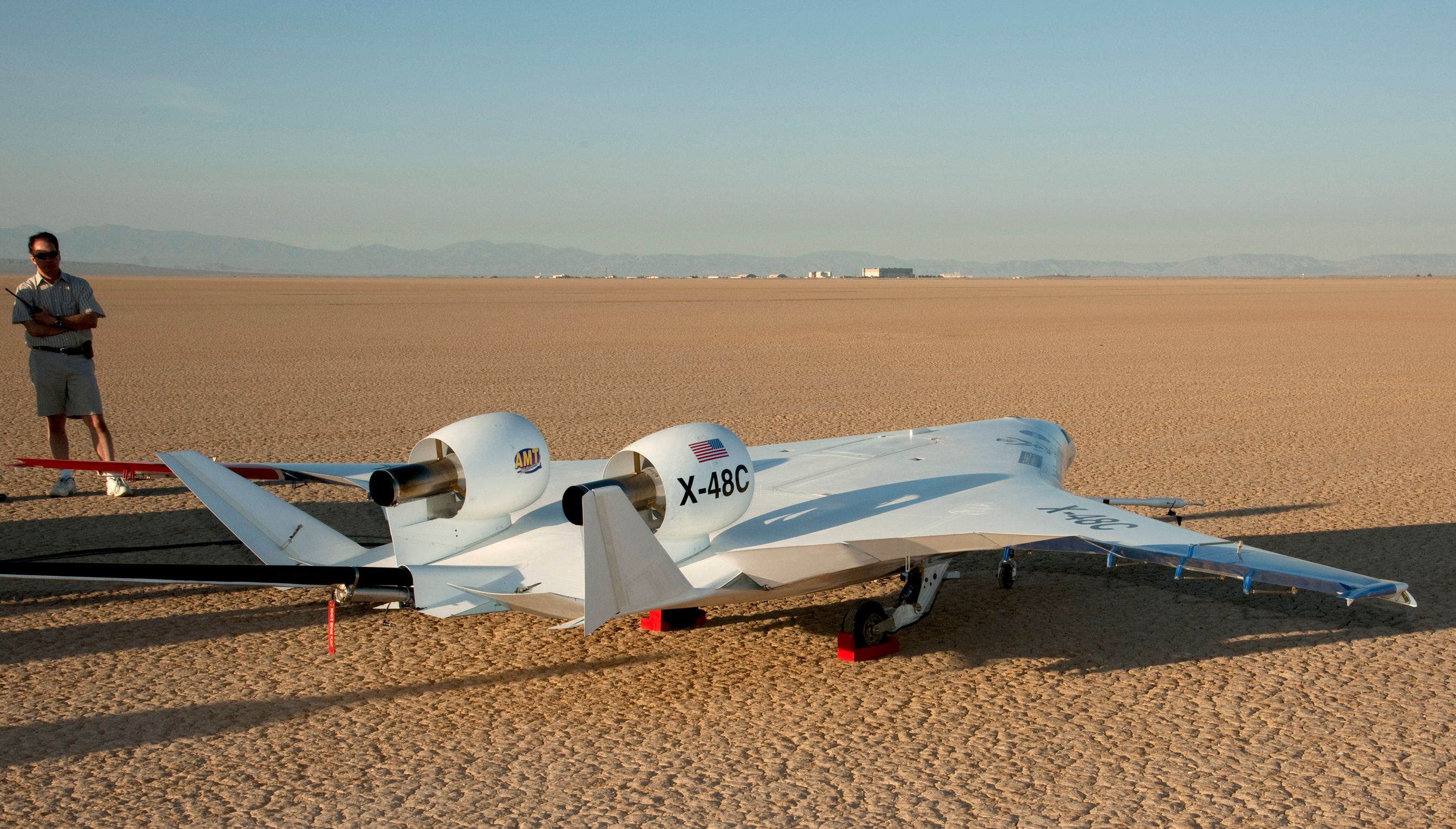
The X-48C featuring two engines and inboard vertical stabilizers

Wind tunnel testing on a 12 feet (3.7 m) wide blended wing body model was completed in September 2005. During April and May 2006, NASA performed wind tunnel tests on X-48B Ship 1 at a facility shared by Langley and Old Dominion University. After the wind tunnel testing, the vehicle was shipped to NASA's Dryden Flight Research Center at Edwards Air Force Base to serve as a backup to X-48B Ship 2 for flight testing. X-48B Ship 2 then conducted ground tests and taxi testing in preparation for flight. In November 2006, ground testing began at Dryden, to validate the aircraft's systems integrity, telemetry and communications links, flight-control software and taxi and takeoff characteristics.

The second X-48B was modified into the X-48C starting in 2010 for further flight tests. The X-48C has its vertical stabilizers moved inboard on either side of the engines, and its fuselage extended aft, both to reduce the aircraft's noise profile; it was to be powered by two JetCat turbines, each producing 80 pounds-force (360 N) of thrust. The X-48C was instead modified to use two Advanced Micro Turbo (AMT) turbojet engines in 2012.

Following flight testing of the X-48C in April 2013, Boeing and NASA announced future plans to develop a larger BWB demonstrator capable of transonic flight.

== Operational history ==
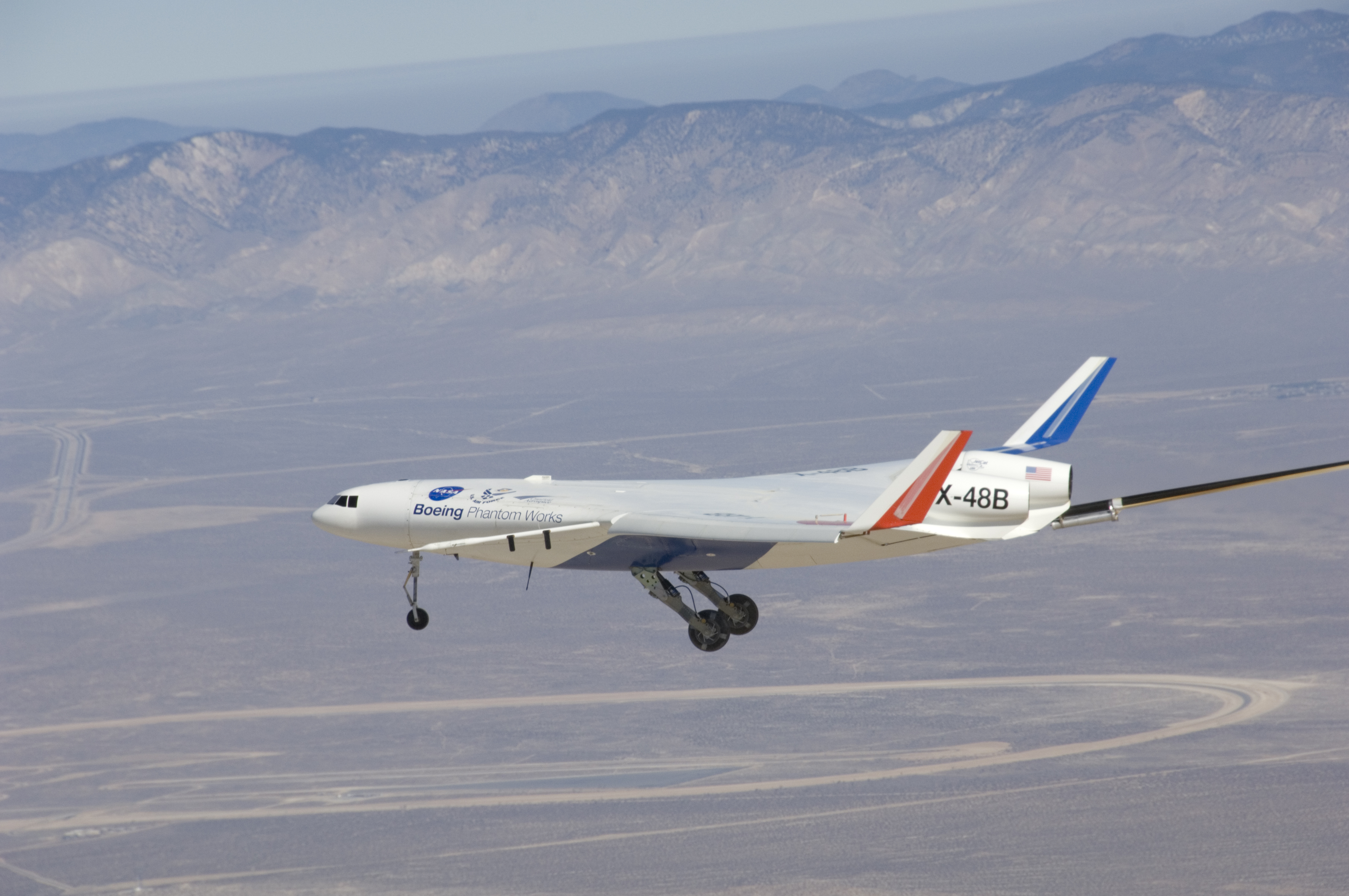
X-48B on its first flight

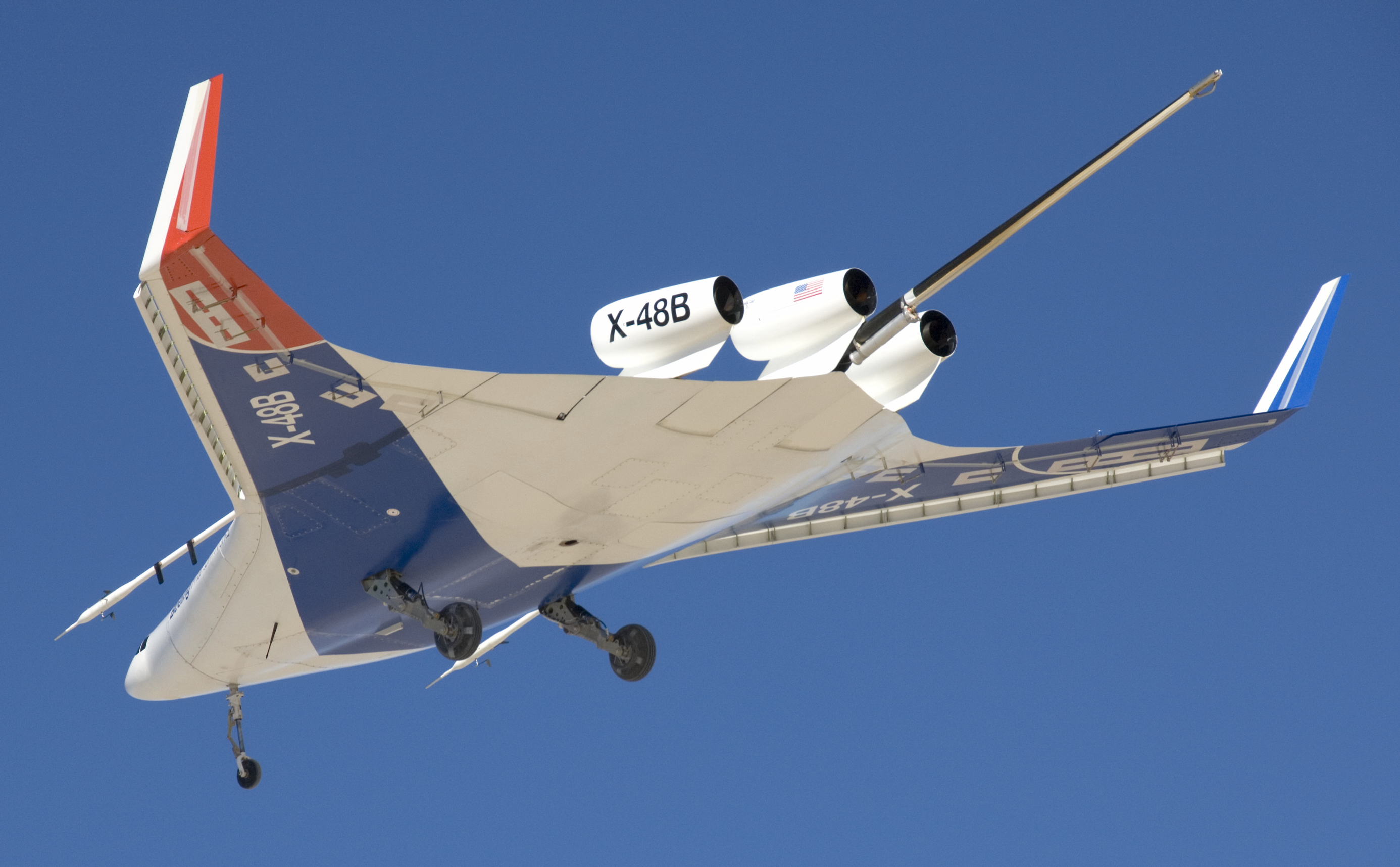
X-48B at first flight as seen from below

The X-48B first flew on July 20, 2007, reaching an altitude of 7,500 ft (2,286 m); the flight lasting 31 minutes. The remotely piloted aircraft was successfully stalled for the first time on September 4, 2008, with fixed leading edge slats, a forward center of gravity, and 23-degree angle of attack (2° beyond the maximum coefficient of lift). Stall testing was repeated on September 11 with a NASA pilot at the console.

On March 19, 2010, NASA and Boeing successfully completed the initial flight testing phase of the X-48B. Fay Collier, manager of the ERA Project in NASA's Aeronautics Research Mission Directorate commented on the completion of the first phase of testing saying, "This project is a huge success. Bottom line: the team has proven the ability to fly tailless aircraft to the edge of the low-speed envelope safely."

Following the installation of a new flight computer in 2010, the X-48B was to continue a new phase of flight tests to investigate controllability aspects. The second phase of flight tests with the X-48B began in September 2010.

The X-48C first flew on August 7, 2012. Engine yaw control was among the aspects to be studied. The X-48C completed its 8-month flight test program with its 30th flight on 9 April 2013.

== Variants ==
X-48A
The initial planned 35 ft (10.7 m) wide version. It was canceled before manufacture.
X-48B
Two 8.5% scale aircraft that have been used for flight testing.
X-48C
A modified, two-engine version of the X-48B intended to test a low-noise design.

== Specifications (X-48B) ==
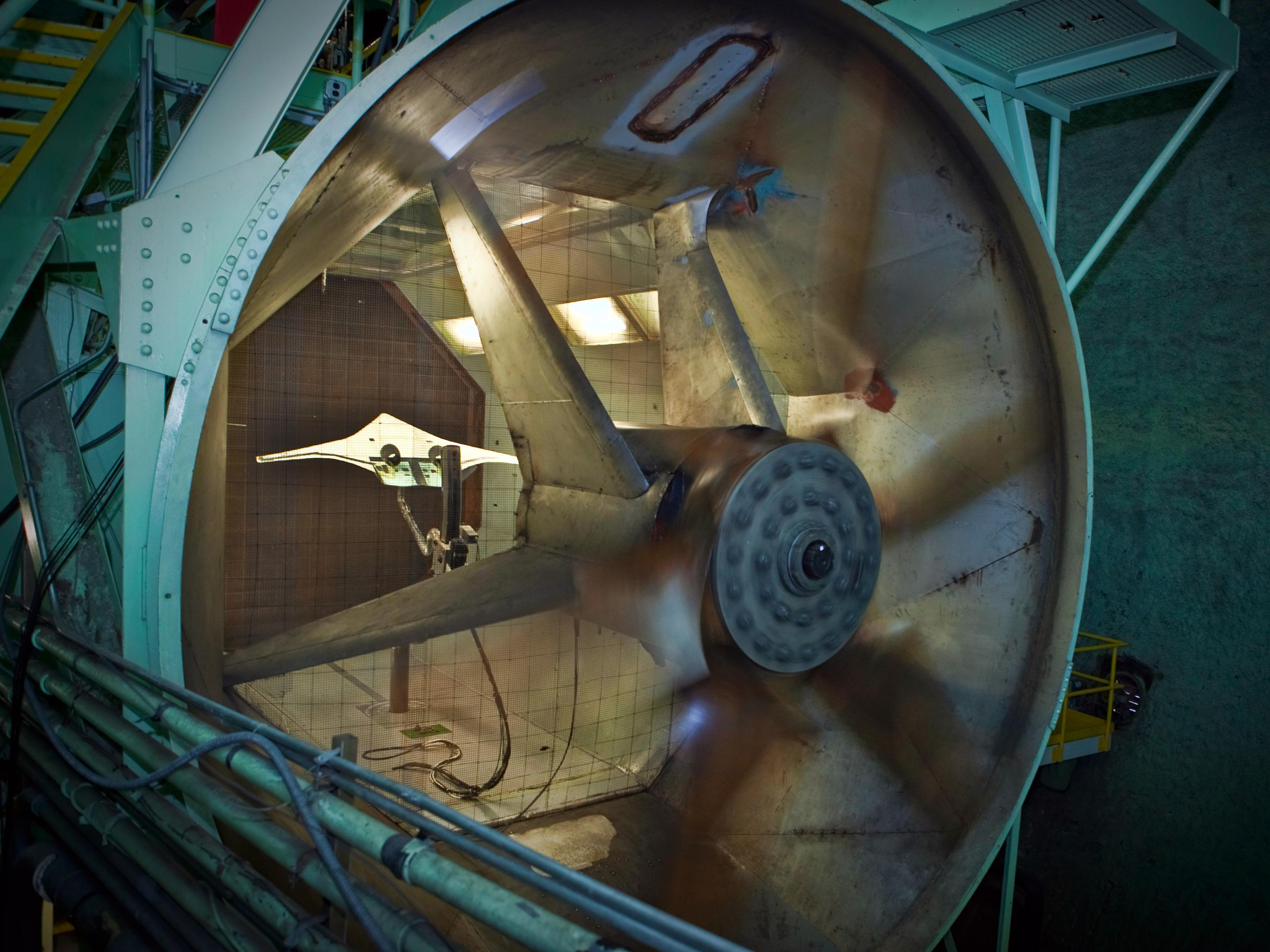
A three percent scale model of the X-48C in NASA Langley's 12 ft (3.7 m) Low-Speed Tunnel

Data from Designation-systems.net, NASA

General characteristics

- Crew: None (onboard)
- Wingspan: 21 ft (6.4 m)
- Wing area: 100.5 sq ft (9.34 m^{2})
- Aspect ratio: 4:1
- Empty weight: 392 lb (178 kg)
- Gross weight: 500 lb (227 kg)
- Powerplant: 3 × JetCat P200 turbojet, 52 lbf (0.23 kN) thrust each

Performance

- Maximum speed: 136 mph (219 km/h, 118 kn)
- Endurance: 40 minutes
- Service ceiling: 10,000 ft (3,000 m)

== See also ==
- Popular Science concept art (Boeing 797 hoax)

Aircraft of comparable role, configuration, and era

- Airbus MAVERIC

Related lists

- List of experimental aircraft
