= Samuel Maverick Jr. =

Texas soldier and businessman (1837–1936)

Samuel Augustus Maverick Jr.
- Born: May 14, 1837; Montpelier Plantation, near Pendleton, South Carolina, U.S.
- Died: February 27, 1936 (aged 98); Austin, Texas, U.S.
- Burial place: Mission Burial Park, San Antonio, Texas, U.S.
- Military career
- Branch: Confederate States Army
- Service years: 1861–1865
- Rank: Second Lieutenant
- Units: Company G, 8th Texas Infantry (Terry's Texas Rangers)
- Conflicts: American Civil War

Samuel Augustus Maverick Jr. (1837–1936) was a Texas soldier and businessman, born May 14, 1837, at Montpelier Plantation, near Pendleton, South Carolina, the first-born of Samuel Augustus Maverick and Mary Ann Adams. His parents brought him to Texas in June 1838 and he grew up in San Antonio during the Republic. In two volumes of memoirs, he recounted his memories of the Council House Fight in 1840 (in which the family's cook saved his life), the evacuation of the city during the incursion by Gen. Rafael Vásquez in 1842, and his father's return from the prison at Perote, Veracruz, in 1843.

Maverick's early education was provided by tutors, and he later attended several local private schools. In 1856, he traveled to Scotland to attend the University of Edinburgh, from which he graduated, probably in 1859.

At the outbreak of the Civil War in 1861, Maverick enlisted in Company B of the First Texas Mounted Rifles under Col. Henry E. McCulloch, but the unit saw insufficient action to satisfy him. In May 1862, he joined Company G of the 8th Texas Infantry, commanded by Col. Benjamin F. Terry and known as Terry's Texas Rangers, with whom he saw action throughout the South. At Fort Donelson, Tennessee, he swam the Cumberland River and set fire to a Union gunboat, for which feat he was commissioned a Second Lieutenant.

After the war, Maverick returned to San Antonio, where he farmed on the land that now makes up Brackenridge Park, north of downtown. In 1867, he passed the state bar examination. He subsequently ran a series of businesses, including a lumberyard and several stores. In 1884 he built the Maverick Bank at the corner of East Houston Street and Alamo Plaza, but the bank failed in 1892. He retired from active business in 1906.

He was long involved in preservation efforts at the Alamo, and in 1888, he contributed $10,000 toward the construction of the Alamo Monument. In 1889, he escorted the Belknap Rifles, a local volunteer military company, to New York to participate in the centennial of the founding of Manhattan. He also donated land to San Antonio which was named Maverick Park in his honor.

Samuel Maverick married Sallie Frost on May 14, 1871 in San Antonio and they had several children. He died in Austin February 27, 1936, at the age of ninety-eight, the last survivor of Terry's Texas Rangers, and was buried at Mission Burial Park in San Antonio.
