= Maverick Technologies =

American industrial automation company

Maverick Technologies Holdings, LLC
- Type: LLC
- Industry: Automation
- Founded: 1999
- Headquarters: Columbia, Illinois, United States,
- Area served: Worldwide
- Key people: Paul Galeski (CEO and founder)
- Number of employees: 500 +
- Website: www.mavtechglobal.com

Maverick Technologies is an industrial automation and enterprise integration company. It has over 500 employees and 18 U.S. locations and operations worldwide and is the largest independent systems integrator in North America.

== History ==
In 1989, Paul Galeski founded MAGNUM Technologies. In 1995, Inc. Magazine cited MAGNUM Technologies as one of the nation's fastest growing companies. In 1997, MAGNUM Technologies was sold to General Electric, where it became a GE Industrial Systems Division subsidiary. Paul Galeski continued to serve as President of the GE Industrial Systems Division until he left GE in early 1999.

Later that year, Paul Galeski founded MAVERICK Technologies and acquired Software Architects, also an Inc. 500 company. Between 2002 and 2004, MAVERICK Technologies acquired RHES Inc. and Professional Maintenance Consultants. In 2005, they acquired GEAS (General Electric Automation Services) and CF Picou, Inc. Between 2006 and 2009, MAVERICK Technologies acquired LaPlace Technologies, Mission Controls and Program4 Engineering.

MAVERICK Technologies partnered with MPE Industrial Automation Europe and MPE Industrial Automation Asia to form the Global System Integrators Alliance (GSIA), a partnership that connects its members to more than 30 locations and 700 professionals worldwide. MAVERICK began international operations in the Netherlands and Thailand in 2008 and Singapore in 2009.

As of 2011, MAVERICK Technologies had completed 10,000 projects in 45 countries on six continents, employed over 500 people globally and had been listed as one of the Inc. 500 fastest growing companies five times.

In 2016, MAVERICK Technologies was acquired by Rockwell Automation.

== Services ==
MAVERICK Technologies provides industrial automation, enterprise integration and manufacturing services to manufacturing and processing industries worldwide.

It serves biofuel, chemical and petrochemical, upstream and downstream oil and gas, bakery, beverage, confectionery, dairy, protein, consumer packaged goods, high-tech manufacturing, life sciences, and power and utilities industries through a network of employees and international partners.

=== Industrial automation ===
MAVERICK’s industrial automation services comprise automation solutions including automation engineering, process automation, industrial automation integration, regulatory-compliant systems and services and distributed control system migration; field services, which include construction management, technician/calibration, outage services and planning, maintenance and installation; and advanced process control services.

=== Enterprise integration ===
MAVERICK’s enterprise integration services comprise manufacturing IT services, including demand planning, production planning and scheduling, sourcing and procurement, logistics and distribution, manufacturing execution/production management, manufacturing intelligence and quality management; and business solutions, which include Microsoft Dynamics AX, customer relationship management (CRM), enterprise manufacturing intelligence (EMI) and enterprise application integration (EAI).

=== Strategic manufacturing solutions ===
MAVERICK’s strategic manufacturing solutions comprise sustaining services, including industrial security solutions; and offers operational consulting services, which include operational strategy, productivity improvements, energy optimization and safety.

== Paul Galeski ==
Paul Galeski, CEO and President of MAVERICK Technologies, was named one of Fast Forward's '40 under 40,' and St. Louis Business Journal ‘Who’s Who in Technology,’ a listing of top young St. Louis area executives. In 2002, Galeski was awarded the Illinois Entrepreneur of the Year and later elected to an International Society of Automation (ISA) Fellow appointment.

Galeski holds a bachelor's degree in electrical engineering from Southern Illinois University, where he is a member of the inaugural class of the SIUE Alumni Hall of Fame and sponsor of the MAVERICK Technologies LLC Scholarship in Engineering. He is a graduate of the GE executive management school and the Harvard Business School President's Program. He is also involved in expert witness testimony, and is a contributing author to Aspatore Books' Inside the Minds, a series of publications that examine C-level business intelligence.

== Awards ==
- 2001–2004, 2006, 2008 — St. Louis Technology Fast 50 Award
- 2002 — CEO Paul J. Galeski awarded Ernst & Young’s Illinois Emerging Entrepreneur of the Year Award
- 2002–2004, 2006, 2008 — Named to the Inc. 500
- 2003 — Achieved Microsoft® Business Solutions Partner status for Microsoft Dynamics™ AX
- 2006 — St. Louis Business Journal Top 50 “Best of Best”
- 2007 — Microsoft Gold Certified Partner for Microsoft Business Solutions
- 2007–2008, 2009 — Named to the Inc. 5000
- 2008 — Frost & Sullivan North American System Integrator of the Year
- 2009 — Control Engineering System Integrator of the Year Finalist
- 2011 — Control Engineering System Integrator of the Year
- 2012 — Control Engineering System Integrator Hall of Fame
- 2015 — Control Engineering System Integrator of the Year

== Acquisitions ==
- 1999 — Software Architects, Inc.
- 2002 — Reed Hannebaum Engineering Services Inc. (RHES)
- 2004 — Professional Maintenance Consultants (PMC)
- 2005 — General Electric Automation Services (GEAS)
- 2005 — CF Picou Inc.
- 2006 — LaPlace Technologies
- 2009 — Mission Controls
- 2009 — Program4 Engineering
- 2014 — CQS Innovation, Inc

== Partnerships ==
- ABB Group
- Emerson
- Honeywell
- Ilitha
- Insist Avtomatika LLC
- Mannai Technical Services
- MPE Industrial Automation
- Omnicon LTDA
- Pektek Industries
- Brian Maverick Waterfield
- Prime Sources Limited
- Profa
- Schneider Electric
- Siemens
- Wonderware
- Yokogawa

== Areas of focus ==
- Advanced process control (APC)
- Automation engineering
- Computerized maintenance management system (CMMS)
- Construction management
- Control systems integration
- Customer relationship management (CRM)
- DCS (Distributed Control System) migration
- Demand planning
- Energy optimization
- Enterprise application integration (EAI)
- Enterprise integration
- Enterprise manufacturing intelligence (EMI)
- Field Services
- Front end engineering and design (FEED)
- Human-machine interface (HMI)
- Industrial automation integration
- Industrial security
- Installation
- Instrument Diagnostics
- Laboratory information management systems (LIMS)
- Main Automation Contractor (MAC)
- Maintenance and support contracts
- Manufacturing execution systems (MES)
- Manufacturing process management (MPM)
- Microsoft Dynamics AX
- Operational Consulting
- Original equipment manufacturer (OEM)
- Process automation
- Programmable logic controller (PLC)
- Safety instrumented systems (SIS)
- Supervisory control and data acquisition (SCADA)
- System Diagnostics
- Technician services / calibration
