= Mary Maverick =

American memoirist and pioneer (1818–1898)

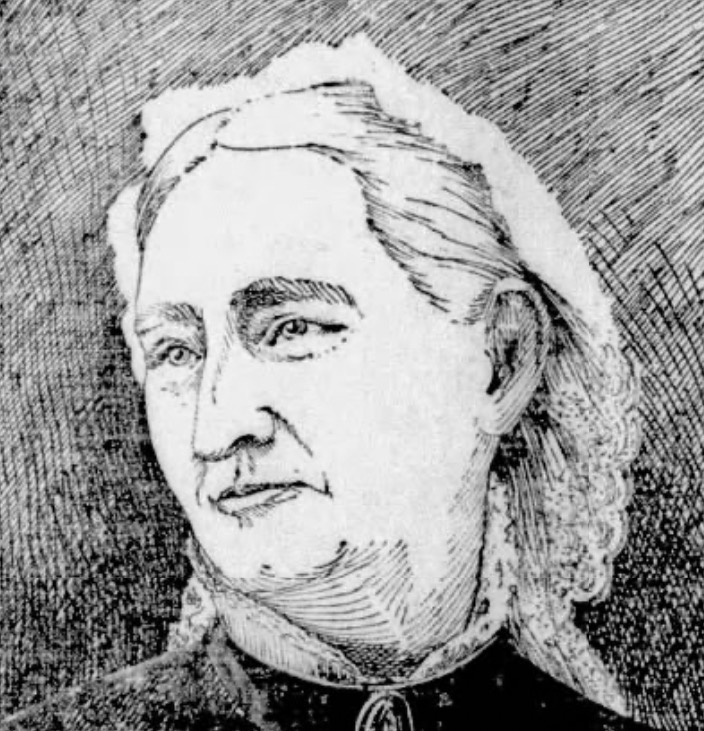
- Born: Mary Ann Adams Maverick; March 16, 1818; Tuscaloosa County, Alabama, US
- Died: February 24, 1898 (aged 79)
- Occupations: Memoirist, pioneer
- Spouse: Samuel Maverick (m. 1836)
- Children: Samuel Jr.
- Relatives: James Madison; Maury Maverick (grandson)

Mary Ann Adams Maverick (March 16, 1818 – February 24, 1898) was an American memoirist and early pioneer in Texas. Her memoirs form an important source of information about daily life in and around San Antonio during the Republic of Texas period through the American Civil War.

== Early life ==
Mary Ann Adams was born in Tuscaloosa County, Alabama, to lawyer William Lewis Adams and Agatha Strother (née Lewis) Adams. Her maternal grandmother was a cousin of James Madison, while her father's family had founded Lynchburg, Virginia. Her parents lived along the James River in Virginia, where her father exported flour and tobacco. During the War of 1812 her father left Virginia for what is now Alabama and bought a plantation near the site of Tuscaloosa. While purchasing supplies in Mobile, Robert Adams answered Andrew Jackson's call for volunteers to help defend New Orleans and raised a company which he led at the Battle of New Orleans. In 1816, her mother came to live permanently in Alabama as well.

In Alabama, Robert Adams practiced law, and in 1827, he served as an agent of U.S. Treasury Department. He died in June 1827, leaving his widow to raise their six surviving children, all under the age of 12. Mary attended boarding school in Tuscaloosa to meet her father's wish that his children be appropriately educated.

On August 4, 1836, Mary Adams married Samuel Maverick, a Yale graduate who had been the Alamo garrison's delegate to the Convention of 1836 declaring Texas' independence from Mexico. Sam Maverick sold his Alabama plantation at the beginning of 1837, and Mary Maverick accompanied her husband to New Orleans so that he could conduct business and be closer to news of Texas. While she was in New Orleans, her brother William Adams left for Texas. In March 1837, she and her husband visited his father in South Carolina, where they refused the elder Maverick's gift of his plantation. On May 14, 1837, she gave birth to her first child, Samuel Maverick Jr. in South Carolina.

== Establishment in San Antonio ==
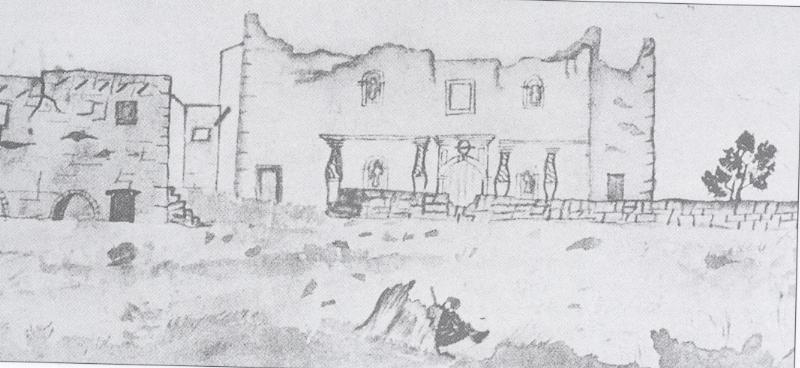
In 1838, Maverick drew this sketch of the Alamo Mission in San Antonio de Bexar.

In October 1837, Mary Maverick, her brother, son, and seven slaves left South Carolina. After a brief stop in Tuscaloosa, they left for the Republic of Texas on December 7, accompanied by her fifteen-year-old brother, Robert Adams, and three additional slaves. The party crossed into Texas near New Year's Day 1838. On February 4, they rented rooms at the home of George Sutherland, and for four months Maverick remained there while her husband continued on to San Antonio.

Maverick and the rest of her party reached San Antonio on June 15, 1838. In her memoirs, she claims to have been the first U.S.-born female to settle in San Antonio, but letters to her mother mentioned another American lady, married to an Irishman, who died shortly after the Mavericks arrived. The family rented rooms at the same home where her brother William resided.

Shortly after moving into a new home along the San Antonio River, Maverick gave birth to her second child, Lewis Antonio Maverick, who became the first Anglo-American child to be born in and grow up in San Antonio. During the next few years, more Anglo families moved to San Antonio. Her brothers returned to Alabama, but William came back to Texas in 1839 with another brother, Andrew, to begin farming. Mary was often left alone, as her husband spent months traveling for business or combing the Texas wilderness on surveying missions.

The Mavericks participated in the so-called Council House Fight on March 19, 1840, when half of a peace-delegation of sixty-five Comanches, consisting of men, women and children, was slaughtered and the other half taken hostage. The Comanche delegation arrived in San Antonio, a traditional safe haven for peace talks, to negotiate a peace treaty and a demarcation line and bargain for the ransom of white captives. The army had ordered prior to the meeting that, if not all Anglo-Texans believed to be Comanche captives at that time were returned at the beginning of the talks, all the negotiators of the band be held until the captives were returned, and then the ransom would be paid. Maverick and a female neighbor had been watching several Indian children playing when they heard gunfire within the council house and saw Indians fleeing from the building. She alerted her husband and brother Andrew, and, while Samuel Maverick rushed outside to chase down the Indians, Maverick and Andrew hurried outside to find the children. They discovered three of the fugitive Indians in the back yard, while their slave cook, Jinny, tried to protect the two Maverick children and her own four children by threatening the Indians with a large rock. Andrew Adams shot two of the three Indians and joined the main fight. Maverick hid her children in the house and watched the battle through the windows. At one point she was curious enough to go outside for a closer look, but was ordered to return indoors by a soldier. The skirmish continued until all of the Indians were dead or captured. In her diary, Maverick wrote that "'All [Indians] had a chance to surrender ... and every one who offered or agreed to give up was taken prisoner and protected.'"

Two days after the battle, Samuel Maverick again left his wife and children alone, under the protection of her two brothers. During his business trip, Sam sold many of his lands in South Carolina and Alabama, and bought two years worth of provisions, which he had shipped to Linville, Texas. Before he could escort the goods on to San Antonio, Linville was raided by a party led by Buffalo Hump, during the Great Raid of 1840, and all of their provisions were destroyed.

In December 1840, Maverick's aunt and uncle, John and Ann Bradley, arrived in Texas from Alabama along with their young children. Happy to be surrounded by family again, Maverick expanded her own family in April 1841 with the birth of her daughter Agatha. Later that year, Maverick's mother, Agatha Adams, planned a journey to visit them and to consider settling in Texas. She fell ill days before she was scheduled to leave, however, and died on October 2.

== Runaway of 1842 ==
The citizens of San Antonio received word in February 1842 that Mexican president Antonio Lopez de Santa Anna was again sending troops into Texas, which Mexico still did not recognize as a separate country. The Mavericks left some of their possessions with Mexican neighbors and joined their other Anglo neighbors in the Runaway of '42. With her brothers William and Andrew, Maverick and her immediate family travelled east, the first time Maverick had left San Antonio since her arrival. For several days, she and the children boarded with a rancher outside of Seguin while her husband and brothers returned to San Antonio to fight. On March 6, the sixth anniversary of the fall of the Alamo, Maverick received word that San Antonio had fallen to Santa Anna. She worried about her men for several days until they appeared, having turned back before reaching San Antonio. The Mavericks moved on to Gonzales, where they squatted in a house left empty when its residents had fled in the Runaway.

The men accompanied Texas army troops to retake San Antonio, and the Mexican army retreated without a fight, although they caused a great deal of damage to the homes of American citizens. Samuel Maverick returned to his wife and moved her to LaGrange so that she would be farther from the threat of Indian attacks. On April 30 he left Maverick alone there while he returned to Alabama to get her younger sister, Elizabeth, who had been living as a boarder since her mother died the previous year.

Samuel Maverick returned to San Antonio without his family in late August 1842 to argue a case before the district court. The Mexican army, under General Adrian Woll, surrounded San Antonio and captured the small number of Anglo-American men in the city. On September 15, Samuel Maverick and his countrymen were forced to march toward Mexico. Mary Maverick's brothers participated in the Battle of the Salado on September 18, where their company ambushed some of the Mexican soldiers, killing 60 of them. Her uncle John Bradley joined another company, and Maverick sent her slave Griffin to go with him. She instructed Griffin to pose as a runaway slave bound for Mexico in the hope that he would be able to help free Samuel Maverick. As an extra assurance, she gave Griffin funds that could be used to ransom back her husband. This band of Texans was surprised by a Mexican cavalry detachment. Griffin was killed in the battle, and Bradley was taken captive and marched to join Samuel Maverick and the other prisoners. Maverick continued to receive letters from her husband during his captivity, so that she could be comforted that he was still alive.

== Other ==
Mary Maverick bore ten children over a span of 21 years. Four died of illness before the age of eight, which led Mary to seek solace in the spiritualism which was increasingly popular in mid-19th-century America. As her surviving children grew up, she became active in the public sphere. During the Civil War, while four of her sons served in the Confederate States Army, she was active in San Antonio relief efforts. Her memoirs relate her attempts to revive the then-dying art of homespun cloth production to supply the needs of the Confederate cause. A devout Episcopalian, she was instrumental in establishing St. Mark's Church in San Antonio and served as president of the Ladies' Parish Aid Society.

== Later life ==
After Sam's death in 1870, as San Antonio grew, Mary Maverick made efforts to see that the pioneer past was not forgotten. She was a prominent member of the San Antonio Historical Society and the Daughters of the Republic of Texas. She helped promote the annual Battle of Flowers celebration, and devoted effort to the restoration and preservation of the Alamo as an historic site.

Her watercolor sketch of the Alamo, completed during her first residence in San Antonio, is one of the earliest-known depictions after the battle. Although she did not herself immigrate to Texas until two years after the fall of the Alamo, in 1889 she wrote a brief account of the battle based on the recollections of witnesses. She died on February 24, 1898, and was buried beside her husband at San Antonio City Cemetery Number 1.

== Memoirs ==
Throughout her life, Mary had kept diaries of her experiences. In 1895, with the help of her son George Madison Maverick, she published these as her memoirs. They provide an engrossing and vivid picture of life on the Texas frontier and mid-19th-century San Antonio, including household management, child-rearing and family life, medical practices, and social and political observations. Mary Maverick's writings, in particular her eyewitness account of the Council House Fight in San Antonio in 1840, are often cited in studies of Texas pioneer life.

In particular, she claimed that Matilda Lockhart, the white captive who was returned by the Comanches to white authorities on that day, had been beaten, raped and had suffered burns to her body. Allegedly, her face was severely disfigured, with her nose entirely burned away, a detail which has been commonly included in Texas history descriptions of the incident since the publications of the Maverick memoirs in 1895.

Reports of abuse are, however, conspicuously missing in primary documents authored by eyewitnesses immediately after the event. Neither Col. Hugh McLeod mentioned any abuse in his report of March 20, 1840 (commenting on the intelligence of the girl but nothing like a missing nose), nor any other Texas officials at the time nor Matilda Lockhart's own sister-in-law, who was in San Antonio, in a letter written to her own mother shortly after the release. Anderson writes: "While published in the 1890s, this description has been used by historians to claim that the massacre came about as a result of the justifiable rage of Texas men. Yet none of the Texas officials claimed this to be the case at the time; evidence of abuse is conspicuously missing in the primary documents, however no reliable narrative counters it. Maverick may have exaggerated Lockhart's condition because of the growing criticism of Texas in the American and European Press. The most significant source on Matilda's condition is a brief statement made in a letter by her sister-in-law, Catherine Lockhart, who was in San Antonio. Catherine describes Matilda's release but says nothing of abuse."
