= Moses Maverick =

Moses Maverick (1611—1686) was a 17th-century English colonist who migrated to the Massachusetts Bay Colony and founded Marblehead, Massachusetts. He served as selectman for 14 years. Maverick Street, Maverick Cove, Maverick Court and Moses Maverick Square are named after him.

== Biography ==
Moses Maverick was born in Devon, England to Rev. John Maverick and Mary Gye. Moses Maverick's older brother is early Massachusetts colonist Samuel Maverick.

Maverick migrated to Dorchester, Massachusetts with his father, soon to become the first minister in Dorchester, in 1630. He became a freeman in 1634. Eventually, Maverick left Dorchester for Salem, settling in the outskirts of town in what was soon to become Marblehead. Through his efforts, Marblehead became a separate entity from Salem in 1649. In reward for these efforts, he was elected as one of the first selectmen in 1649, a position he would hold for fourteen years between 1649 and his death. He held various other local positions and was the town's leading figure.

Moses Maverick died in Marblehead in 1686 at the age of 74.

== Personal life ==
Moses Maverick married twice. First, to Remember Allerton, daughter to Isaac Allerton, who had come over on the Mayflower. His second wife was Eunice Cole and they were married by Governor John Endecott.
