= John Maverick =

Rev. John Maverick (1578–1636) was the first minister of the First Parish Church of Dorchester in early colonial Dorchester, Massachusetts.

John Maverick was born to Rev. Peter Maverick, a vicar in Awliscombe, Devon in 1578. In 1595, Maverick enrolled in University of Oxford. Five years later, in 1600, he married Mary Gye. Two of their sons, Samuel and Moses, are notable people in early Massachusetts history. In 1603, Maverick received his MA from Oxford. He was the curate for his uncle, Rev. Radford Maverick, from 1606 to 1614. Afterwards, he was rector of a church in Beaworthy, Devon until 1629.

Maverick became a Puritan before migrating to the Massachusetts Bay Colony at Dorchester, Massachusetts on 30 May 1630, where he served as the first minister of the First Parish Church of Dorchester with Rev. John Warham.

He became a freeman in 1631 and helped establish the government in Dorchester; he died February 3, 1636. His eulogy was by John Cotton and Governor John Winthrop.
