= Maverick Framework =

- Website: mav.sourceforge.net

Maverick is a model–view–controller (MVC) framework for the Java platform.

== Technology ==
Maverick supports structured and modular web application development through the MVC pattern.

As is common Maverick uses a single servlet entry point. It concentrates on MVC logic leaving other technologies for presentation support. It is highly configurable, but can be difficult to manage in large applications.

== Maverick.NET ==
Maverick.NET is a port that have been made of Maverick to the Microsoft .NET Framework.

== See also ==
- Struts
- Java EE
