= Airbus MAVERIC =

European experimental UAV

MAVERIC

General information
- Type: Experimental unmanned aerial vehicle
- Manufacturer: Airbus
- Number built: 1

History
- Manufactured: 2017
- First flight: June 2019

The Airbus MAVERIC (Model Aircraft for Validation and Experimentation of Robust Innovative Controls) is an experimental blended wing body (BWB) unmanned aerial vehicle. It was built as a demonstrator for a possible full-scale BWB airliner. Airbus claims that this design can reduce fuel consumption by up to 20%.

== Design and development ==
According to an Airbus press release, development of the MAVERIC began in 2017 as part of the AirbusUpNext research program. The primary purpose of the MAVERIC is to research controllability improvements for blended wing body aircraft. The MAVERIC is a radio-controlled aircraft and has a wingspan of 3.2 meters. Power is provided by two engines mounted over the rear of the aircraft, with each having a vertical stabilizer, creating a twin tail arrangement.

According to Airbus, a full-scale development of the MAVERIC would have fuel consumption reduced by 20% compared to single-aisle airliners. The location of the engines above the fuselage would also reduce noise pollution.

== Operational history ==
The MAVERIC made its first flight in June 2019 at an undisclosed location in France. The public reveal of the aircraft took place on February 11, 2020, at the Singapore Airshow, where it was announced that the research program would continue until the second quarter of that year.

On September 21, 2020, Zero Emissions Day, Airbus revealed three concepts for the hydrogen-powered Airbus ZEROe; the largest of which was a blended wing aircraft based on the MAVERIC.

== Specifications (MAVERIC) ==
Data from

General characteristics

- Length: 2 m (6 ft 7 in)
- Wingspan: 3.2 m (10 ft 6 in)
- Wing area: 2.25 m^{2} (24.2 sq ft) (approx.)

== See also ==
Aircraft of comparable role, configuration, and era

- Boeing X-45
- Boeing X-48
- Northrop Grumman Bat

Related lists

- List of experimental aircraft
