= Samuel Maverick (colonist) =

Early colonist in the Massachusetts Bay Colony

Samuel Maverick (c.1602—c. 1670) was one of the first colonists to settle in the Massachusetts Bay Colony. Arriving ahead of the Winthrop Fleet, Maverick became one of the earliest settlers, one of the largest landowners and one of the first slave-owners in Massachusetts. He signed his name as "Mavericke". He is the ancestor of rancher Samuel Maverick, from whom the term maverick for "independently minded" and an unbranded animal derives.

== Early life and career ==
Coat of Arms of Samuel Maverick

Maverick was born around 1602 to the Anglican priest John Maverick and Mary Gye; his father was one of the first ministers in Dorchester, Massachusetts upon migrating to the colony in 1630. Samuel's brother, Moses Maverick is also an important historical figure, in Marblehead, Massachusetts.

Samuel Maverick was in North America in 1623-24, after explorer Capt. Christopher Levett, before his father's arrival in Dorchester some years later. Samuel Maverick first settled at Winnisimmet, modern-day Chelsea.

Maverick settled in the area close to modern-day Boston, after his arrival in Massachusetts, which he later claimed was in 1624. Some historians have suggested that Maverick arrived in the area with English explorer Capt. Christopher Levett, who made an exploration of the New England coast about that time.

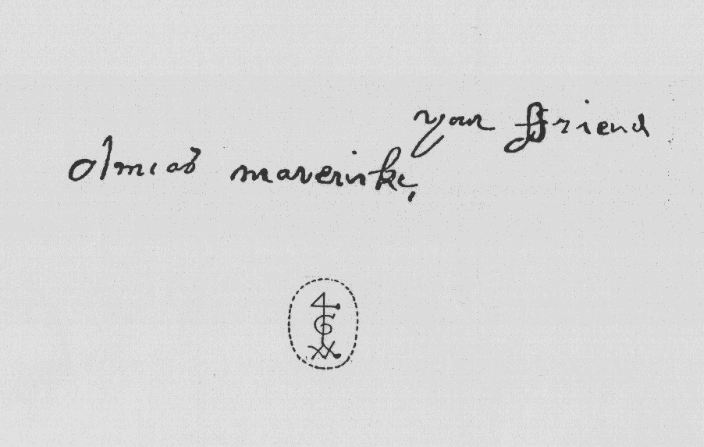
Signature and seal of Amias (née Cole) Thomson Maverick, November 1635

In 1628 Maverick married Amias Cole Thompson, widow of colonist David Thompson, who had been sent by Sir Ferdinando Gorges as an early explorer and settler to New Hampshire, and later settled on present-day Thompson Island in Boston Harbor. After Thompson's death, his wife inherited his properties, including Noddle's Island. Maverick built a fortified house on Noddle's, to ward against Indian attacks, and armed it with four guns. It is said to be the first permanent house in Massachusetts. Maverick and Amias had three children, and Amias had a son from her previous marriage.

In 1631 the first ferry ran from the Maverick farm to Charlestown and Boston. In April 1633 general court granted Maverick property rights to most of the area of modern-day Chelsea excluding Prattville. In March 1635 Maverick sold his holdings outside his farm in Winnisimmet to Richard Bellingham, the deputy governor of Massachusetts. The same year he visited Virginia to buy seed corn and remained there for a year. When he returned he had two pinnaces and had also bought many livestock.

In 1638, Maverick was recorded as purchasing black slaves, becoming one of the earliest slave-owners in Massachusetts. In 1638, Maverick ordered one of his male black slaves to rape one of his female slaves in order to "breed negros", an act which shocked visiting English writer, John Josselyn, who comforted the victim. In 1640, Boston granted him 600 acres (240 ha) of land from Boston and 400 acres (160 ha) from Braintree. In 1646, Maverick was among the seven merchants and entrepreneurs who signed the Remonstrance, petitioning the Massachusetts General Court for conformity to English law and more moderate civil and church policies. John Child and William Vassall included the Remonstrance in their 1647 pamphlet, New England's Jonas cast up in London. In 1664, he visited England and was granted an audience with King Charles II on April 23. When he stated that he had been persecuted because he was an Anglican and a royalist, the king appointed him as one of the four commissioners to arbitrate disputes in New England. He was also to reduce Dutch influence in the colonies.

The Royal Commission of 1664 was granted both military and civil powers in Massachusetts but was eventually unsuccessful. Maverick eventually gave up his possession in Noddle's Island and moved to New York.

== Death and legacy ==
The exact date of Maverick's death is unknown; the last sign of him is a letter signed October 15, 1669. The year of his death was thought to be 1670.

Maverick Square in East Boston, which now occupies the land that was once Noddle's Island, is named for Maverick.
