= Maverick (animal) =

Unbranded domestic animal

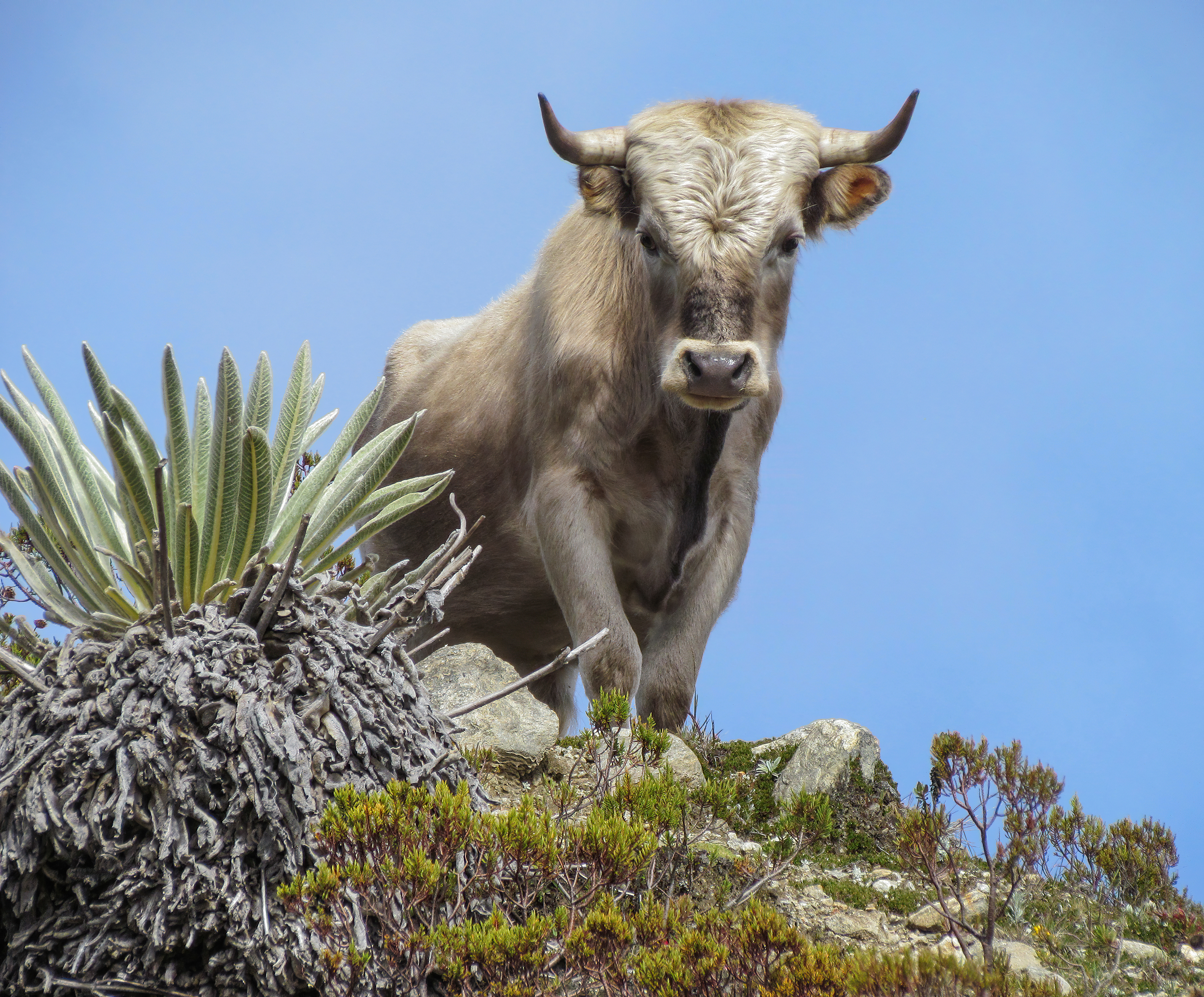
A feral bull in the Sierra Nevada, Venezuela

A maverick is an animal, usually a form of cattle, that does not carry a brand.

== Etymology ==
The term maverick derives from Samuel Maverick, a Texas financier who among other claims to fame was notorious for neglecting to brand his cattle.

Other analogous U.S. terms include slick, hairy dick, and, in Spanish-speaking areas of the Southwest, orejano. In other parts of the world different terms are used. In Australia and New Zealand, for example, an unbranded animal is a cleanskin.

== History ==
=== American Old West ===
In the era of American Old West, cattle were grazed on open range. As a result, cows would thus give birth in wild or semi-wild conditions. Occasionally calves would fail to be collected in the annual round up and escape branding. More rarely, these would grow into mature animals. As such, they could be captured, claimed, and branded by any rancher capable of doing so.

=== The US today ===
Some animals are left unbranded today for reasons that include being destined for the show ring, to avoid a scar on a hide intended for leatherworking, and opposition to a practice seen as cruel. These animals, however, are not left free of identification, receiving instead some form of somewhat more humane methods, which include freeze branding, tattooing, attachment of ear tags, and microchip implanting, usually placed in the neck.

As a result of this variety of methods, and the reality that most cattle today are run on private ranches, an unidentified mature animal is rarely found today. When one is, the most common practice is to make a concerted effort to locate a possible owner; failing that, the animal is typically put up for public auction at a sheriff's sale, with the proceeds used to defray costs incurred in its handling.
