= Advanced process control =

Concept in control theory

In control theory, advanced process control (APC) refers to a broad range of techniques and technologies implemented within industrial process control systems. Advanced process controls are usually deployed optionally and in addition to basic process controls. Basic process controls are designed and built with the process itself to facilitate basic operation, control and automation requirements. Advanced process controls are typically added subsequently, often over the course of many years, to address particular performance or economic improvement opportunities in the process.

Process control (basic and advanced) normally implies the process industries, which include chemicals, petrochemicals, oil and mineral refining, food processing, pharmaceuticals, power generation, etc. These industries are characterized by continuous processes and fluid processing, as opposed to discrete parts manufacturing, such as automobile and electronics manufacturing. The term process automation is essentially synonymous with process control.

Process controls (basic as well as advanced) are implemented within the process control system, which may mean a distributed control system (DCS), programmable logic controller (PLC), and/or a supervisory control computer. DCSs and PLCs are typically industrially hardened and fault-tolerant. Supervisory control computers are often not hardened or fault-tolerant, but they bring a higher level of computational capability to the control system, to host valuable, but not critical, advanced control applications. Advanced controls may reside in either the DCS or the supervisory computer, depending on the application. Basic controls reside in the DCS and its subsystems, including PLCs.

== Types of Advanced Process Control ==
Following is a list of well-known types of advanced process control:

- Advanced regulatory control (ARC) refers to several proven advanced control techniques, such as override or adaptive gain (but in all cases, "regulating or feedback"). ARC is also a catch-all term used to refer to any customized or non-simple technique that does not fall into any other category. ARCs are typically implemented using function blocks or custom programming capabilities at the DCS level. In some cases, ARCs reside at the supervisory control computer level.
- Advanced process control (APC) refers to several proven advanced control techniques, such as feedforward, decoupling, and inferential control. APC can also include Model Predictive Control, described below. APC is typically implemented using function blocks or custom programming capabilities at the DCS level. In some cases, APC resides at the supervisory control computer level.
- Multivariable model predictive control (MPC) is a popular technology, usually deployed on a supervisory control computer, that identifies important independent and dependent process variables and the dynamic relationships (models) between them and often uses matrix-math based control and optimization algorithms to control multiple variables simultaneously. One requirement of MPC is that the models must be linear across the operating range of the controller. MPC has been a prominent part of APC since supervisory computers first brought the necessary computational capabilities to control systems in the 1980s.
- Nonlinear MPC is similar to multivariable MPC in that it incorporates dynamic models and matrix-math based control; however, it does not require model linearity. Nonlinear MPC can accommodate processes with models with varying process gains and dynamics (i.e., dead times and lag times).
- Inferential control: The concept behind inferential control is to calculate a stream property from readily available process measurements, such as temperature and pressure, that otherwise might be too costly or time-consuming to measure directly in real time. The accuracy of the inference can be periodically cross-checked with laboratory analysis. Inferential measurements can be utilized in place of actual online analyzers, whether for operator information, cascaded to base-layer process controllers, or multivariable controller CVs.
- Sequential control refers to discontinuous time- and event-based automation sequences that occur within continuous processes. These may be implemented as a collection of time and logic function blocks, a custom algorithm, or a formalized sequential function chart methodology.
- Intelligent control is a class of control techniques that use various artificial intelligence computing approaches like neural networks, Bayesian probability, fuzzy logic, machine learning, evolutionary computation, and genetic algorithms.

== Related Technologies ==
The following technologies are related to APC and, in some contexts, can be considered part of APC, but are generally separate technologies having their own (or in need of their own) Wiki articles.

- Statistical process control (SPC), despite its name, is much more common in discrete parts manufacturing and batch process control than in continuous process control. In SPC, “process” refers to the work and quality control process, rather than continuous process control.
- Batch process control (see ANSI/ISA-88) is employed in non-continuous batch processes, such as many pharmaceuticals, chemicals, and foods.
- Simulation-based optimization incorporates dynamic or steady-state computer-based process simulation models to determine more optimal operating targets in real-time, i.e., periodically, ranging from hourly to daily. This is sometimes considered a part of APC, but in practice, it is still an emerging technology and is more often part of MPO.
- Manufacturing planning and optimization (MPO) refers to ongoing business activity to arrive at optimal operating targets that are then implemented in the operating organization, either manually or, in some cases, automatically communicated to the process control system.
- Safety instrumented system refers to a system independent of the process control system, both physically and administratively, whose purpose is to assure the basic safety of the process.

== APC Business and Professionals ==
Those responsible for the design, implementation, and maintenance of APC applications are often referred to as APC Engineers or Control Application Engineers. Usually, their education is dependent upon the field of specialization. For example, in the process industries, many APC Engineers have a chemical engineering background, combining process control and chemical processing expertise.

Most large operating facilities, such as oil refineries, employ a number of control system specialists and professionals, ranging from field instrumentation, regulatory control system (DCS and PLC), advanced process control, and control system network and security. Depending on facility size and circumstances, these personnel may have responsibilities across multiple areas or be dedicated to each area. Many process control service companies can be hired for support and services in each area.

== Artificial Intelligence and Process Control ==
The use of artificial intelligence, machine learning, and deep learning techniques in process control is also considered an advanced process control approach in which intelligence is used to optimize operational parameters further.

For decades, operations and logic in process control systems in oil and gas have been based only on physics equations that dictate parameters along with operators’ interactions based on experience and operating manuals. Artificial intelligence and machine learning algorithms can look into the dynamic operational conditions, analyze them, and suggest optimized parameters that can either directly tune logic parameters or give suggestions to operators. Interventions by such intelligent models lead to optimization in cost, production, and safety.

== Terminology ==
- APC: Advanced process control, including feedforward, decoupling, inferential, and custom algorithms; usually implies DCS-based.
- ARC: Advanced regulatory control, including adaptive gain, override, logic, fuzzy logic, sequence control, device control, and custom algorithms; usually implies DCS-based.
- Base-Layer: Includes DCS, SIS, field devices, and other DCS subsystems, such as analyzers, equipment health systems, and PLCs.
- BPCS: Basic process control system (see "base-layer")
- DCS: Distributed control system, often synonymous with BPCS
- MPO: Manufacturing planning and optimization
- MPC: Multivariable model predictive control
- SIS: Safety instrumented system
- SME: Subject matter expert
