= Samuel Maverick =

American politician (1803–1870)

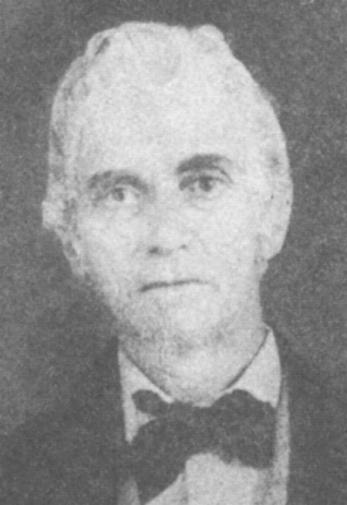

108th Mayor of San Antonio
- In office 1839–1840
- Preceded by: Antonio Menchaca
- Succeeded by: John William Smith

Personal details
- Born: Samuel Augustus Maverick; July 23, 1803 Pendleton, South Carolina, U.S.
- Died: September 2, 1870 (aged 67) San Antonio, Texas, U.S.
- Party: Democratic
- Spouse: Mary Adams (m. 1836)
- Relatives: Maury Maverick (grandson)
- Profession: Military and Politician

Samuel Augustus Maverick (July 23, 1803 – September 2, 1870) was a Texas lawyer, politician, land baron and signer of the Texas Declaration of Independence. His name is the source of the term "maverick", first attested in 1867. He was the grandfather of Texas politician Maury Maverick, who coined the term gobbledygook (1944).

== Early years ==
Samuel Augustus Maverick was the oldest son of Samuel Maverick, a Charleston businessman, and his wife Elizabeth Anderson. His Maverick ancestors had arrived in the New World in 1624, before emigrating to Barbados and later to Charleston. After his paternal grandfather died, in 1793 his grandmother, Lydia Maverick (née Turpin), married American Revolutionary War general Robert Anderson. In October 1802, his father married Anderson's daughter Elizabeth, and nine months later, on July 23, 1803, Maverick was born at his family's summer home in Pendleton District, South Carolina. To his family, Maverick was known as "Gus". Over the next four years the family lived in Charleston, and his mother bore four more children, one of whom, Robert, lived less than a day. In September 1809, his sister Ann Caroline died of yellow fever. His father, having watched his ten siblings succumb to the same disease as children, moved his family permanently to Pendleton. For the rest of his life, the elder Samuel Maverick cautioned his children to always live in a healthful climate so that they would not fall victim to a tropical disease.

While in Charleston, the elder Samuel had operated a successful business importing goods from England, the Netherlands, Germany, Cuba, and France. After moving to Pendleton he gradually withdrew from his Charleston-based ventures and began to operate a small business in Pendleton. In 1814, the Maverick family expanded with the birth of another daughter, Lydia. Four years later, when Maverick was fifteen, his mother died.

It is likely that Maverick's early education took place at home. In early 1822, he traveled to Ripton, Connecticut, to study under a tutor. In September of that year he was admitted to Yale University as a sophomore. At Yale, he was known as "Sam". After graduating in 1825, Maverick returned to Pendleton and apprenticed under his father to learn business affairs. For the next year, his father deeded him land, and on February 4, 1826, he made his first land purchase, acquiring half a lot in Pendleton.

In 1828, Maverick traveled to Winchester, Virginia, to study law under Henry St. George Tucker, Sr. He became licensed to practice law in Virginia on March 26, 1829, and several weeks later he received his license to practice in South Carolina. He soon established a law practice in Pendleton. The following year he ran for a seat in the South Carolina legislature, advocating for a peaceful resolution to the tariff problem and against nullification. This was not a popular strategy, and Maverick placed 9th out of 13 candidates, gathering 1,628 votes.

Maverick relocated to Georgia in early 1833, where he unsuccessfully ran a gold mine. He returned home at the end of the year. On January 24, 1834, he left Pendleton for Lauderdale County, Alabama, taking 25 of his father's slaves to operate a plantation his father had given him. They arrived in March. Later that year his widowed sister, Mary Elizabeth, moved to Alabama to live near him with her three children. Maverick did not enjoy running a plantation, primarily because he did not like supervising slaves. On March 16, 1835, he left Alabama to go to Texas.

== Texas Revolution ==
Maverick took the brig Henry from New Orleans and arrived at Velasco, at the mouth of the Brazos River, in April 1835. His interest in Texas extended back almost ten years, as in 1826 he noted in his journal that Stephen F. Austin had received a land grant and that Mexico was quickly being settled. When he arrived, there were fewer than 30,000 people living in the territory, which was then part of Mexico. Maverick immediately set out to buy land, making his first purchase on May 20. To officially transfer the title, Maverick had to go to San Felipe, and he spent the next several months traveling up and down the Brazos River from San Felipe looking for more land to buy. After recovering from a bout of malaria, Maverick journeyed to the drier climate of San Antonio, which was surrounded by large swaths of unclaimed land. Fifteen days after arriving in San Antonio he began buying large tracts of land

At this time there was much political unrest in Texas, as the colonists did not trust Mexican president Antonio López de Santa Anna to abide by the promises that had been made in the Mexican Constitution of 1824. The Mexican government believed that the colonists were preparing to revolt and hand Texas to the United States. After having been held in a Mexican prison for over 18 months, a newly released Austin returned to Texas with stories of what he had seen in the Mexican capital, and on September 19, 1835, he issued a call to arms. The first shot of the Texas Revolution soon occurred at Gonzales. General Martín Perfecto de Cos, the commander of the Mexican army in San Antonio, was distrustful of the Anglos in the area, and on October 16 he placed a guard at the door of the home where Maverick was staying. Maverick, his host John Smith, and another boarder, A.C. Holmes, were forbidden to leave the city. The Texan army soon arrived and, by October 24, had initiated the Siege of Bexar. Maverick had long kept a diary, which provided a "generally faithful eyewitness record of the events" of the siege. During this time, Maverick and his fellow prisoners sent missives to the Texans with information about the occurrences within the city, with many of them going to his childhood friend Thomas Jefferson Rusk.

On December 1, Cos allowed Maverick and Smith to leave the city. They approached the Texan army, offered their first-hand knowledge of the situation, and urged an attack. The commander of the army, Edward Burleson, recommended a retreat instead. Ben Milam offered to lead an attack, and several hundred men volunteered to accompany him. On the morning of December 5, Maverick guided Milam's detachment into the city, while Smith guided a second detachment under Colonel Frank Johnson. For five days the men fought building-to-building. During the fighting, Milam took a bullet to the head, and Maverick caught his body as it fell. Cos surrendered on the morning of the sixth day, and Maverick attended the surrender ceremony with Burleson and Johnson.

The provisional Texas government had decided in November that all land sales in Texas after August 20, 1835, would be voided, but with the hostilities temporarily over, Maverick continued to buy land in and around San Antonio. He remained with the army stationed at the Alamo. The garrison was prohibited from voting in the election for San Antonio delegates to the Texas independence convention because they were considered transients. The men held their own election, and chose Maverick and James Butler Bonham, who had worked as a lawyer in Pendleton at the same time as Maverick. Bonham declined to accept his nomination, and Jesse Badgett was elected in his place.

Although Badgett left for the convention, Maverick remained at the siege of the Alamo until March 2, the same day the other delegates were signing the Texas Declaration of Independence. By this time the Alamo was surrounded by Mexican troops, and according to Maverick's children; when Maverick left, William Barret Travis (the commander of the Texan forces at the Alamo) urged him to convince the convention to send reinforcements. Maverick arrived at the convention on Saturday, March 5, with his friend Smith, who carried one of Travis's final missives. The convention was in recess for the weekend, but a special session was called for the following day. By the time the special session concluded, the Battle of the Alamo had concluded, and the Alamo defenders were all dead. Maverick signed the Texas Declaration of Independence the following day, and remained at the convention to help draft the new Texas constitution. Despite his efforts, the new constitution rendered his land claims after August 20 invalid, but it also provided land grants to each resident as of March 2. On March 16, the convention adjourned, having completed a constitution and elected an interim government. Maverick traveled with another delegate to Nacogdoches, where he remained for several weeks while suffering from an illness. After recovering, he returned to Alabama to help his sister.

One may note conflicting reports as to whether Maverick signed the Declaration. While his name is among those omitted from the print published version, his signature clearly appears on page 11 of the hand-written original as "Saml. A Maverick (from Bejar)."

== Marriage and return to Texas ==
Shortly after returning to Alabama, Maverick met eighteen-year-old Mary Ann Adams, whom he married within three months. At the beginning of 1837, he sold his Alabama plantation and with his wife moved to New Orleans, both to receive faster news from Texas and to supervise the agent who was conducting mercantile activities on his behalf. In March, Maverick brought his wife to South Carolina to meet his father. The elder Maverick offered to give the newlyweds his plantation, but Maverick refused as he wished to return to Texas. While they were in South Carolina, Mary Maverick gave birth to a boy, Samuel Maverick, Jr.

In October 1837, the new family and seven slaves left South Carolina. After a brief stop in Tuscaloosa, they traveled overland to the Republic of Texas, accompanied by their slaves, Mary's brother Robert, and his three slaves. The party reached Texas near New Year's Day 1838. On February 4, they reached the home of George Sutherland in Jackson County, and the bulk of the traveling party remained as boarders there for the next four months. Maverick continued to San Antonio and began buying headright certificates using the money he received from the sale of his lands in Alabama. He received his own headright on March 2 after four citizens testified that Maverick had participated in the Texas Revolution.

Maverick's family joined him in San Antonio on June 15, 1838, where they rented rooms in the same home as Mary's brother William. They purchased their own home along the San Antonio River in early 1839, where their son Lewis Antonio Maverick was born in March 1839.

By the end of 1839, Maverick had purchased 41 lots. He assumed that there would be an influx of settlers eager to buy the land, but emigration slowed after 1838. Maverick received his Texas law license in November 1838 and began arguing cases in district court. In January 1839 he was elected the mayor of San Antonio. During his one-year term, he also acted as city treasurer and served as a precinct justice of the peace. For the next several years, Maverick spent a great deal of time away from home, either surveying frontier lands or traveling to New Orleans on business. He narrowly escaped death while on a surveying trip in late 1839. Because he had promised his wife that he would be home on a specific day, Maverick left the surveying camp early. Later that day, Comanches raided the camp and killed all but one person, who was scalped.

Comanche raids were frequent in the San Antonio area, and Maverick joined the militia. When an attack was noticed, the church bell would ring, and Maverick and his fellow militia members would have to be ready to leave within 15 minutes. They would chase the raiders with the hopes of recovering captives and any stolen goods. Maverick participated in the Council House Fight on March 19, 1840, as the citizens of San Antonio attempted to capture or kill Native Americans who had reneged on previous agreements to return captives. Two days after the fight, Maverick left for New Orleans, leaving his family under the protection of his wife's two brothers. During his trip, he collected money from rents on various properties and sold more of his lands in Alabama and South Carolina. He used the money to buy two years of provisions, which he shipped to Linnville. Before he could escort the goods to San Antonio, Native Americans led by Buffalo Hump raided Linnville and destroyed all of the supplies.

In December 1840, his wife's uncle, John Bradley, moved to Texas with his wife and their young children and settled near the Mavericks. By the end of the year, Maverick owned full title to 4,605 acres (18.64 km^{2}), with 12,942 acres (52.37 km^{2}) under survey. The following year, Maverick became the treasurer of the city council.

== Imprisonment ==
In February 1842, word came that Santa Anna was again sending troops into Texas, which Mexico still regarded as a rebellious province. The Mavericks joined a group of Anglo Texans fleeing San Antonio, an event later known as the Runaway of '42. After a brief stop in Seguin, they moved on to Gonzales, and squatted in a house left empty when the owners had fled in the Runaway. Maverick and the other men in the party joined Texan army troops to retake San Antonio, but the Vásquez Expedition retreated without a fight, although they caused extensive damage to the homes of the Texas citizens.

Maverick moved his family to La Grange after several Native American scares in Gonzales, and on April 30 he left for Alabama to retrieve his wife's younger sister, who had been living alone since her mother died the year before. Maverick returned to Texas in July, and the following month he again left his family, this time to go to San Antonio to argue a case before the district court. In early September, San Antonio was surrounded by Mexican troops led by General Adrian Woll. The approximately 60 Anglo-Texans in town gathered in Maverick's home, but were soon forced to surrender to the army.

On September 15, the Anglos were forced to march towards Mexico with a guard of 150 Mexican soldiers. Two bands of Texans tried to rescue them; neither succeeded, and the second, which included Mary's uncle John Bradley, was also captured and joined Maverick's group in their march. For three months the group marched, finally stopping at San Carlos Fortress in Perote, Veracruz. Although the journey was difficult and the men were often forced to sleep in manure-filled sheep pens, in his journal Maverick wrote that he "saw and experienced a thousand new thrills." On the fifth day after their arrival at the fortress, the men were chained together in pairs. Several days later they were put to hard labor. On behalf of the men, Maverick complained about the almost non-existent food rations and was rewarded with solitary confinement on January 5, 1843.

Despite his imprisonment and the fact that his family now lived in Fayette County, Maverick was elected by the people of San Antonio to represent them in the Seventh Texas Congress. He was unable to attend the legislative session. Maverick was offered his freedom several times, on the condition that he publicly support Mexico's claim to Texas. Maverick responded, "I cannot persuade myself that such an annexation, on any terms, would be advantageous to Texas, and I therefore cannot say so, for I regard a lie as a crime, and one which I cannot commit even to secure my release." The Mexican government finally released him on March 30, the same day his wife gave birth to a daughter, whom she named Augusta. On May 4 Maverick returned home, bringing with him the chain with which he had been bound.

== Texas Congress ==
By June, Maverick had returned to San Antonio on court and land business. He was reelected to the Texas House of Representatives, gaining 202 votes, the highest total of the 3 candidates. As part of the 8th Texas Congress, Maverick and his colleagues met at Washington-on-the-Brazos rather than at the state capital, Austin, which was vulnerable to Native American and Mexican raids. In his time in office, Maverick helped pass a bill, over President Sam Houston's veto, which repealed Houston's ability to grant colonization contracts. Maverick added a clause specifying that previously granted contracts would be forfeited if their terms were not met in the future. As chair of the Enrolled Bills Committee, he helped certify which bills were correctly submitted to the President. He was also a member of the Finance, Public Lands and Native American Affairs committees, as well as the committee on Foreign Relations, which castigated Houston for not providing information to the Congress on his annexation negotiations with the United States.

== Land baron ==
Mary Maverick and their children were often ill, and in November 1844 the family sold their land along the Colorado River and moved to Decrow's Point, across from Port Cavallo on Matagorda Bay. They lived there for three years, where the new climate helped them to stay healthier.

In 1844, the tax rolls showed that Maverick owned 35,299 acres (142.85 km^{2}) by title in Bexar County and Bexar Territory, with an additional 20,077 by survey, as well as 21 town lots. The following year he also purchased 11,000 acres (45 km^{2}) for his father, intended to be an inheritance for Maverick's children and nieces and nephews. Since 1840, Maverick had tripled his land holdings. As he was bringing the land documents home in June 1845, the boat he was in capsized. Maverick barely survived drowning and lost all of his papers.

== Later years ==
After Texas' annexation by the United States, he was elected to the Texas Legislature. Fifteen years later, as the American Civil War loomed, Maverick supported Sam Houston in his call to support the Union. Nevertheless, he voted for secession as a member of the convention. Shortly afterward, he accompanied Philip N. Luckett and another Texas commissioner of safety to negotiate with U.S. Army General David E. Twiggs for the peaceful surrender of Federal garrisons in Texas.

Maverick served once again as mayor of San Antonio from 1862 to 1863. After the Civil War was over, he helped John H. Reagan to reorganize the Democratic Party.

He died on September 2, 1870, and is interred at San Antonio City Cemetery No. 1.

Maverick County, Texas, is named for him. U.S. Representative from Texas Maury Maverick (1895–1954) was his grandson.

== Alamo cannon ==
During construction of Maverick's house in 1852, 13 of the 21 cannons used during the Battle of the Alamo were unearthed. They had been damaged and buried by retreating Mexican soldiers following the Battle of San Jacinto. The Maverick family donated them to the Alamo Mission where they are now on display.

== Cattle branding ==
Maverick steadfastly refused to brand his cattle. As a result, the word maverick, slang for someone who exhibits a streak of stubborn independence, also entered the English lexicon as a term for an unbranded range animal.

Maverick's stated reason for not branding his cattle was that he didn't want to inflict pain on them. Other ranchers suspected his true motivation was that it allowed him to collect any unbranded cattle and claim them as his own – though written accounts of his lack of interest in his herd and its failure to grow during his ownership undermine this claim.

Mary Maverick appended to her memoirs certain of her husband's correspondence and an extract of a letter from George Madison Maverick, her son and collaborator in her biography, to the St. Louis Republic, apparently in response to an appeal to persons having sure information about the matter to convey their accounts to the editor.

George recounted that, in 1845, his father, whose interest was in real estate, acquired some 400 head of cattle that he did not want from a neighbor as payment of a $1,200 (~$38,315 in 2024) debt. Maverick left them to be managed by an African American family, who subsequently moved from the Gulf coast to the Conquista Ranch on the San Antonio River, where the cattle were left to multiply, graze, and wander away. Over a decade later, enough had wandered off, or been taken by others, that the number of head ostensibly belonging to Maverick remained the same. Whether rounded up without an identifying mark or taken because they lacked one, many such so-called "mavericks" ended up branded by other ranchers and claimed as their own.

In 1856, a Mr. Leo J. Toutant followed up on his own father's earlier offer to purchase Maverick's herd, then numbering some 400, and did so.

== See also ==
- Mrs. Samuel Maverick (1818–1898)
- Samuel Maverick, Jr. (1837–1936)
- Maverick disambiguation page

== Notes ==
Texas House of Representatives
Preceded by None	Member of the Texas House of Representatives from District 70 (San Antonio); 1853–1855	Succeeded by William H. Cleveland
Texas Senate
Preceded by Isaiah Addison Paschal	Texas State Senator from District 31 (San Antonio); 1855–1859	Succeeded by Gustav Schleicher
Preceded by M. D. K. Taylor	President pro tempore of the Texas Senate; 1858–1859	Succeeded by Jesse Grimes
Texas House of Representatives
Preceded by unknown	Member of the Texas House of Representatives; 1859–1863	Succeeded by unknown
