= Nolder =

Small aerodynamic shape on an automotive

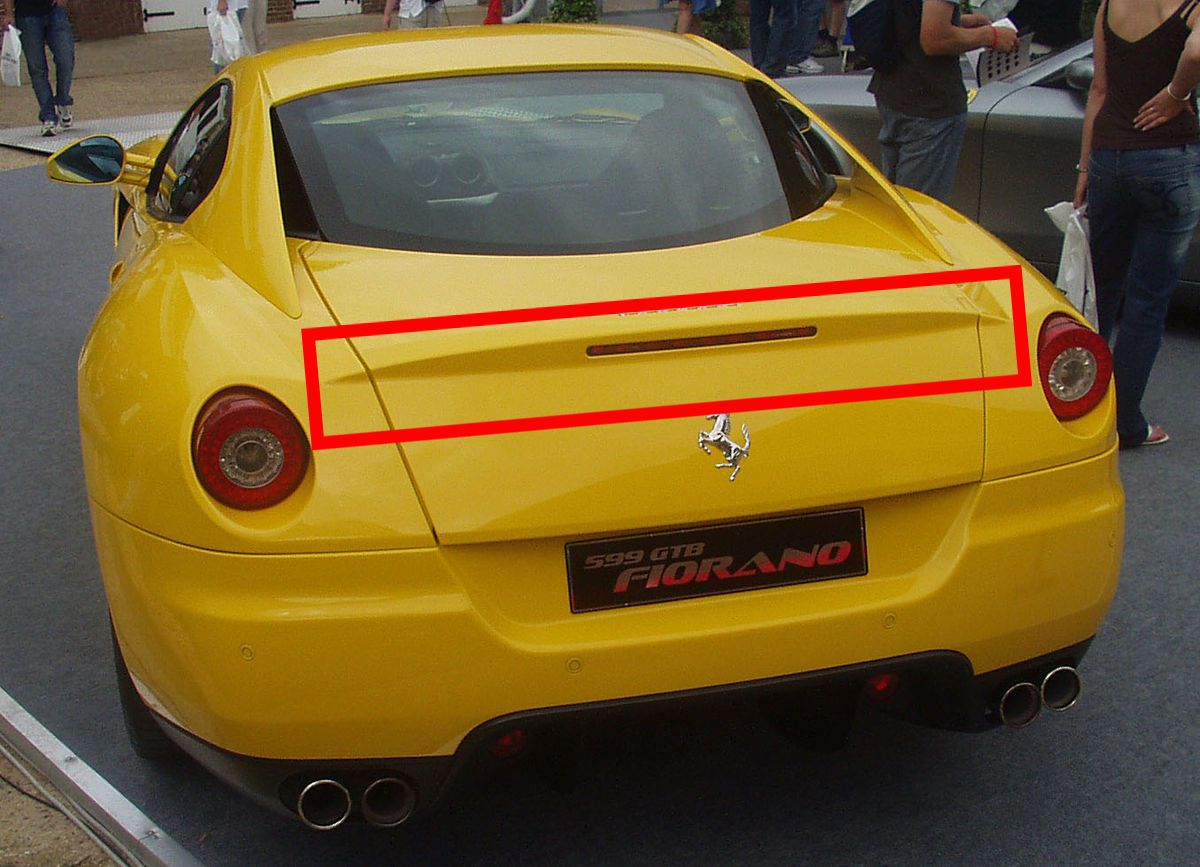
Nolder, highlighted on rear deck of Ferrari 599, with lateral sail panels at rear window directing air to the Nolder

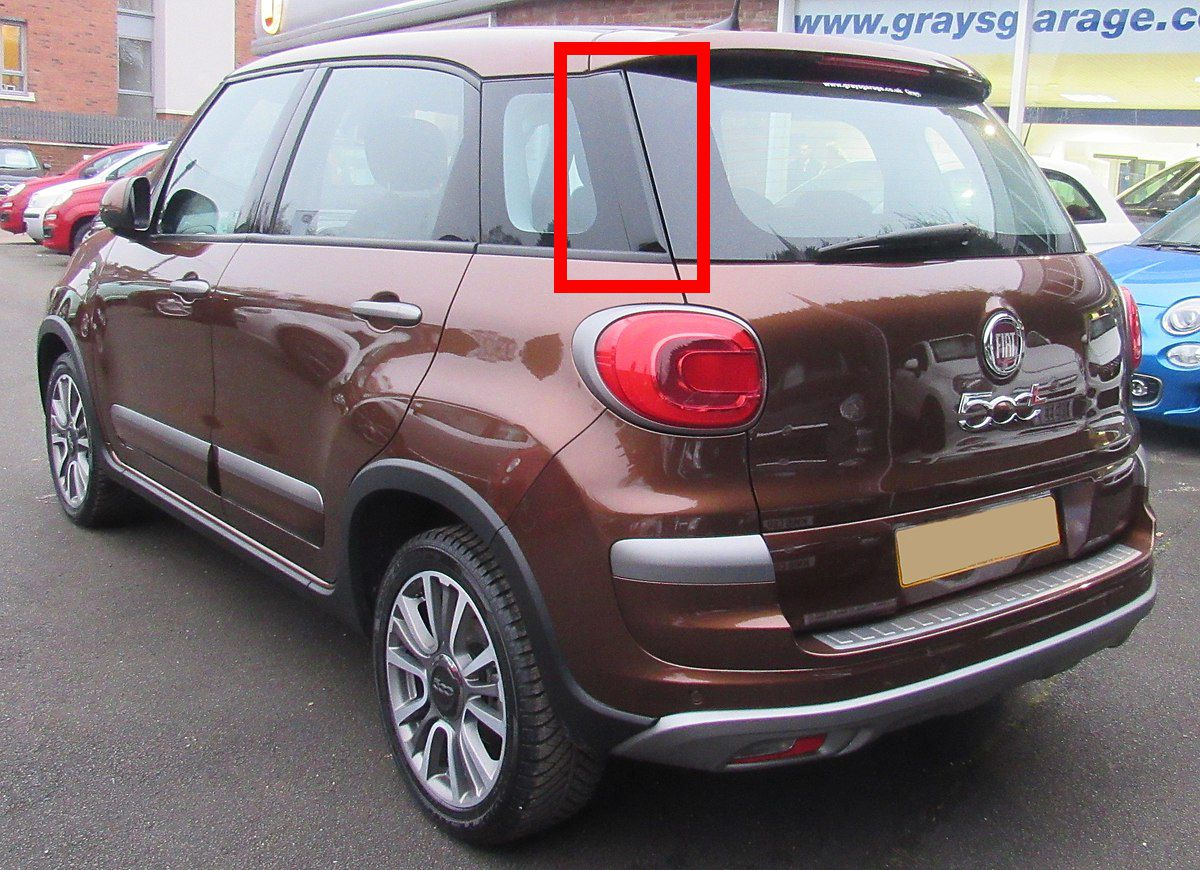
Nolder, highlighted on D-pillar Fiat 500L

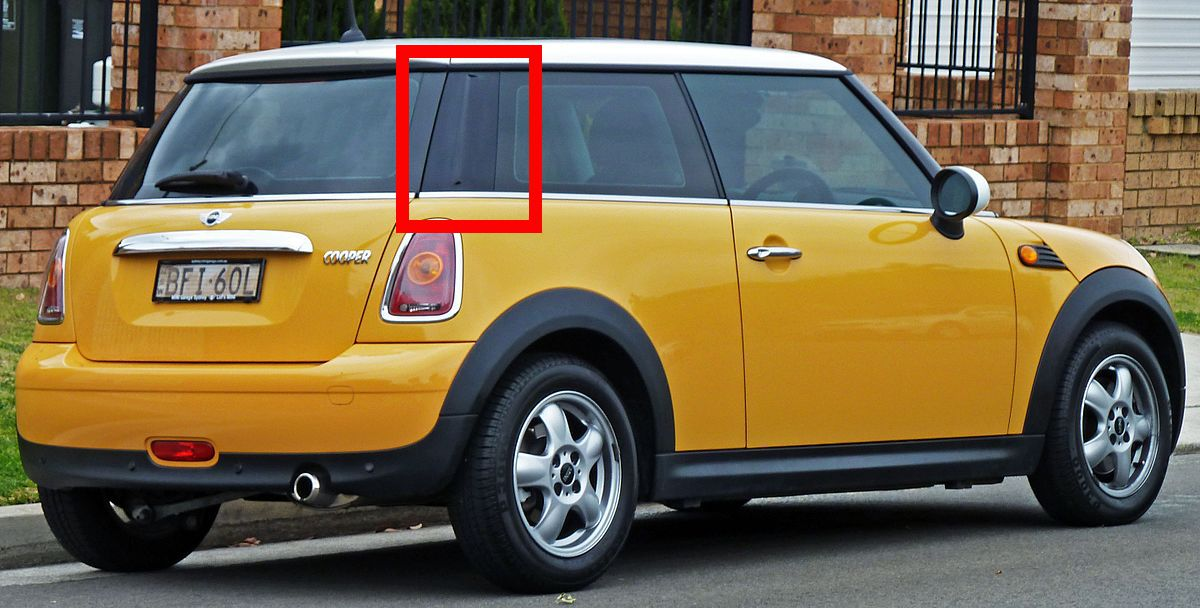
Nolder, highlighted on C-pillar of Mini Cooper

In automotive design, a nolder is a small aerodynamic shape (a strip, wing, protrusion, lip or profile) integral to bodywork or to an aerodynamic attachment – e.g., a spoiler, diffuser or splitter – perpendicular to the direction of air flow travel for the purpose of further managing and refining air flow.

Nolders are used in both high-performance as well as in less critical aerodynamic applications.

== Etymology ==
In 1996, Autocar attributed original use of the term to Ferrari, with other sources citing the nolder as having derived from Formula One racing, where Ferrari has been prominent.

The Formula One Dictionary defines a nolder as "a small upside-down L-shaped aerodynamic appendage generally positioned on the trailing edge of the rear wing to increase downforce at low speed."

The Automotive Dictionary defines it as a "very small aerodynamic appendage that's fitted to an airfoil to increase down-force without affecting drag resistance."

== Applications ==
In the design of high-performance vehicles, a nolder of limited size can significantly increase or decrease the lift (Cz) of a vehicle's aerodynamic profile.

Nolders are also used in less high-performance applications, for example forcing an airflow separation alongside a vertical rear window to minimize debris accumulation, e.g., with a small hatchback.

== Examples ==
Examples include the underside of the LaFerrari, which features a nolder to assist with vehicle dynamics. The Ferrari 599 GTO features prominent flanking aerodynamic fins or flying buttresses aside the rear window, maximizing air flow to a linear rear nolder. The Ferrari 355 has a similar nolder profile at the upper portion of its tail.

The Koenigsegg CCXR features an optional front splitter with a nolder, and the spoiler at the rear bumper of the Maserati 320S features a supplementary nolder to increase the vertical load to the rear.

Early versions of the highly aerodynamic 1982 Ford Sierra suffered crosswind instability, which was addressed in 1985 with the addition of aerodynamic nolders on the rear edge of the rubber seals of the rear-most side windows.

For airflow management and to assist in keeping the rear window free from dirt, nolders are integral to the rearmost vertical pillar of Mini Cooper models and the Fiat 500L.

== See also ==
- Diffuser (automotive)
- Servo tab
- Trim tab
