= Ferrari F355 =

Ferrari mid-engine sports car

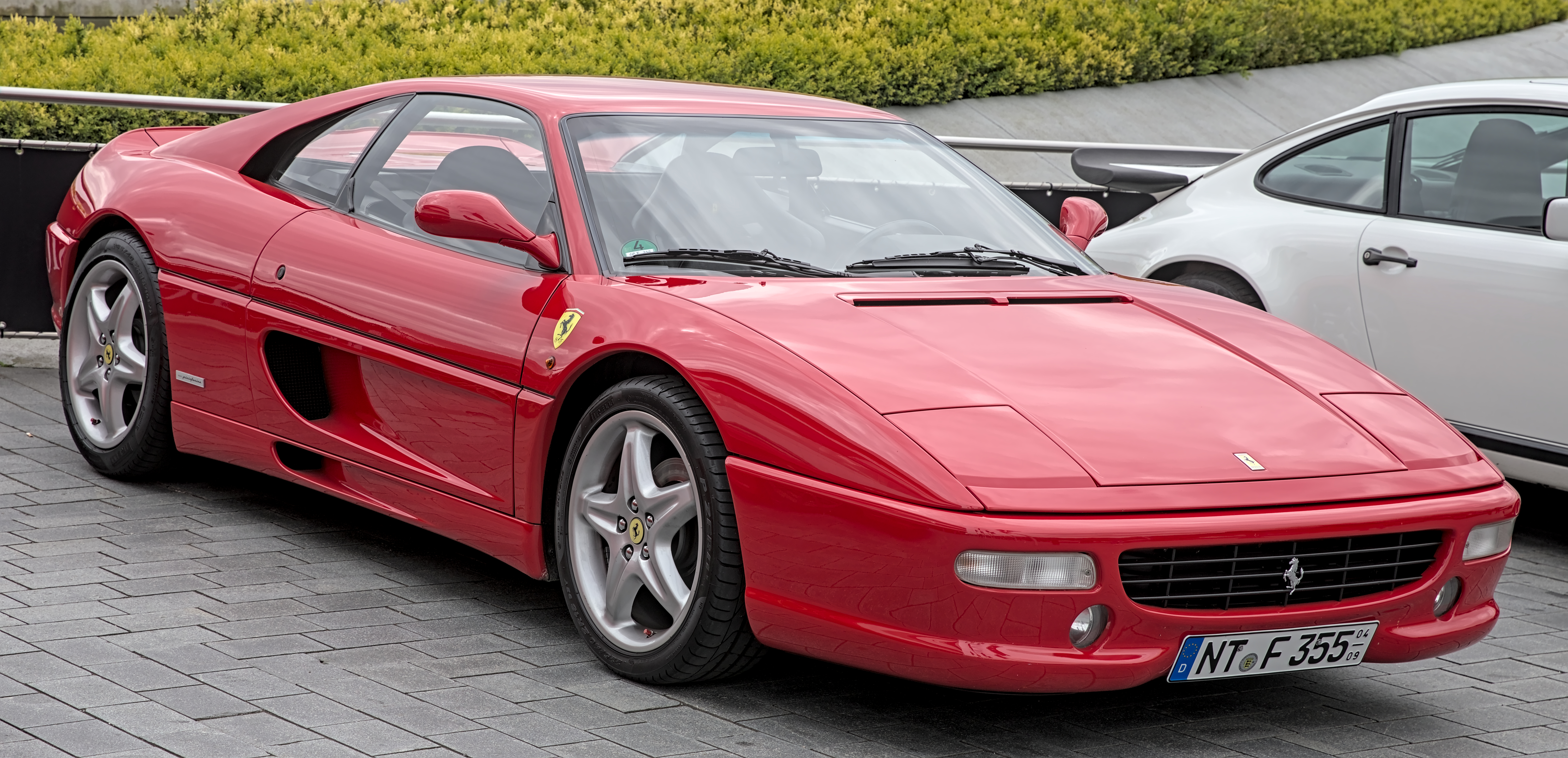
- Ferrari F355 Berlinetta

Overview
- Manufacturer: Ferrari
- Also called: Ferrari 355 F1
- Production: May 1994–1999
- Model years: 1995–1999
- Assembly: Italy: Maranello
- Designer: Maurizio Corbi at Pininfarina

Body and chassis
- Class: Sports car (S)
- Body style: 2-door berlinetta; 2-door targa top; 2-door convertible (spider)
- Layout: Longitudinal, Rear mid-engine, rear-wheel drive

Powertrain
- Engine: 3.5-litre 5V F129 B/C V8
- Transmission: 6-speed manual; 6-speed F1 automated manual

Dimensions
- Wheelbase: 2,451 mm (96.5 in)
- Length: 4,249 mm (167.3 in)
- Width: 1,900 mm (75 in)
- Height: 1,171 mm (46.1 in)
- Kerb weight: 1,483–1,497 kg (3,270–3,300 lb)

Chronology
- Predecessor: Ferrari 348
- Successor: Ferrari 360

The Ferrari F355 (Type F129) is a sports car manufactured by Italian car manufacturer Ferrari produced from May 1994 until 1999. The car is a heavily revised Ferrari 348 with notable exterior and performance changes. The F355 was succeeded by the all-new Ferrari 360 in 1999.

Design emphasis for the F355 was placed on significantly improved performance, as well as drivability across a wider range of speeds and in different environments (such as low-speed city traffic).

== Specifications ==
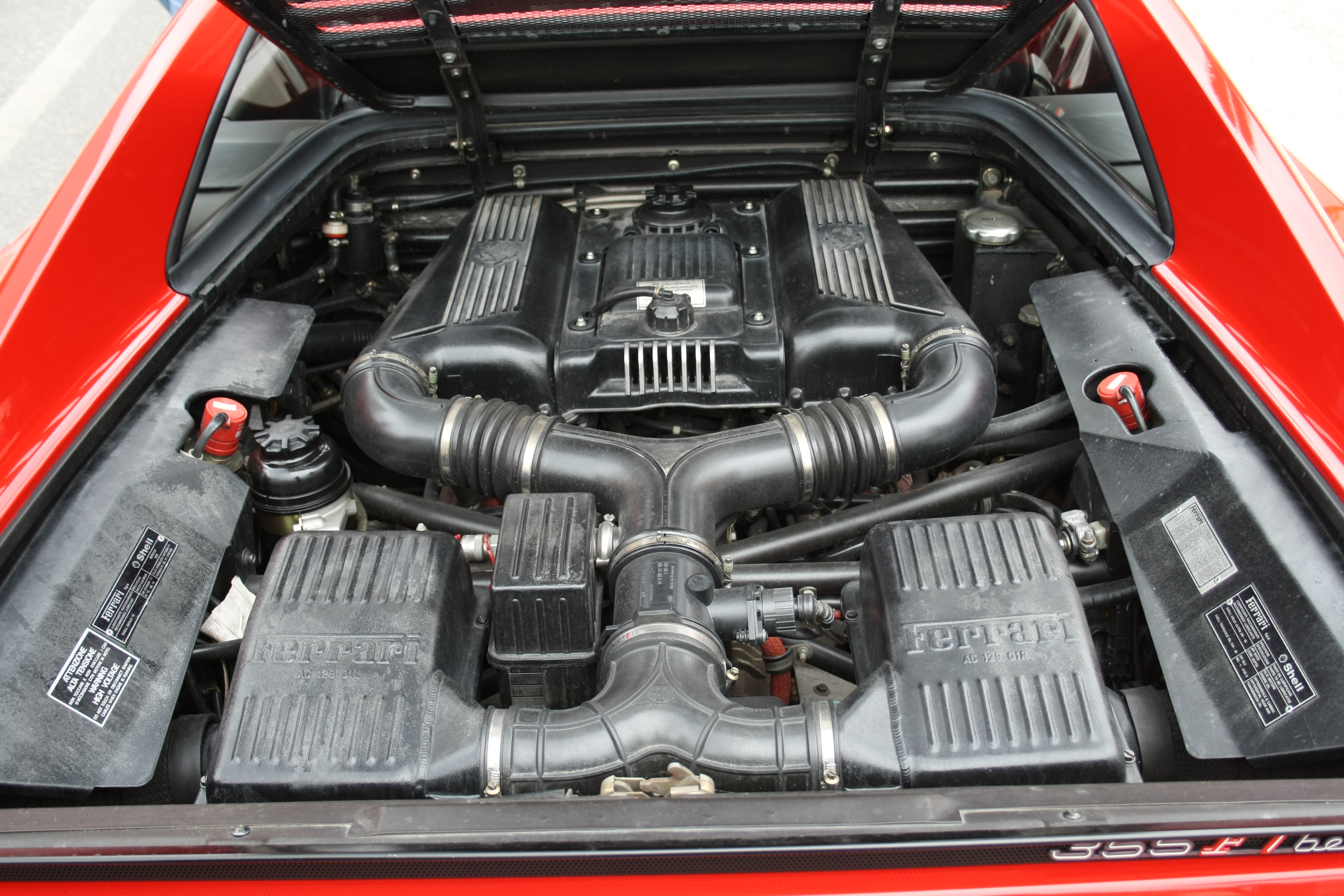
The Tipo F129B V8 Engine (5.2 Motronic shown)

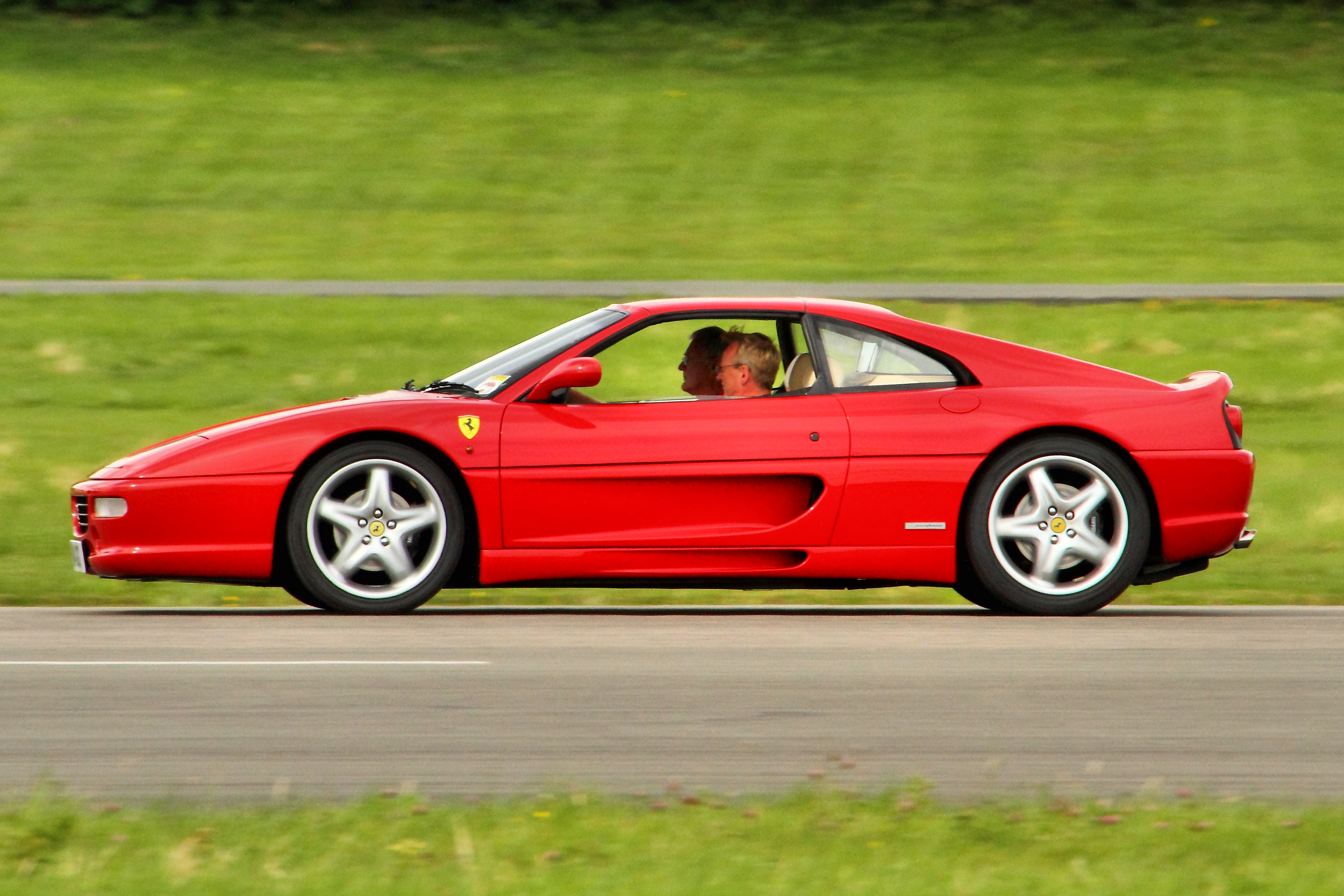
The side profile of the Ferrari F355

Ferrari F355 Spider engine sound
Recorded from inside the engine compartment

Apart from the displacement increase from 3.4 L (3,405 cc) to 3.5 L (3,495 cc), the major difference between the V8 engine in the 348 and F355 is the introduction of a 5-valve cylinder head. This new head design allowed for better intake permeability and resulted in an engine that was considerably more powerful, generating a maximum power output 380 PS (279 kW; 375 hp) at 8,250 rpm and 363 N⋅m (268 lb⋅ft) of at 6,000 rpm. The longitudinally mounted 90° V8 engine was stroked by 2 mm over the 348's engine (77 mm rather than 75 mm), resulting in the small increase in displacement. Engine internals are produced using lightweight materials; the connecting rods are forged in Ti6-Al-4V titanium alloy. The engine's compression ratio is 11:1 and employs the Bosch Motronic 2.7 engine control unit in the 1995 model year, later changed to the M5.2 in 1996 through end of production. The Motronic system controls the electronic fuel injection and ignition systems, with a single spark plug per cylinder. Engine lubrication is via a dry sump oiling system. The engine was designed by Paolo Martinelli.

The F355 addressed transmission issues that plagued the earlier models. A coolant heat-exchanger was installed which upon startup, warmed the gearbox oil quicker. A rod-driven actuation system, which replaces the 348's cable operated system, was also added for precise gear shifts.

The frame is a steel monocoque with tubular steel rear sub-frame with front and rear suspensions using independent, unequal-length wishbones, coil springs over gas-filled telescopic shock absorbers with electronic control servos and anti-roll bars. The car allows selection between two damper settings, "Comfort" and "Sport". The road-going models came with Pirelli tyres, size 225/40ZR 18 at the front and 265/40 ZR 18 at the rear. Although the F355 was equipped with power-assisted steering (intended to improve low-speed drivability relative to the outgoing 348), this could optionally be replaced with a manual steering rack setup by special order.

Aerodynamics for the car included over 1,300 hours of wind tunnel analysis. The car incorporates a nolder profile on the upper portion of the tail and a fairing on the underbody that generates downforce when the car is at speed.

The car's standard seats are upholstered with hides from Connolly leather, and are fitted asymmetrically in the car; this results in the driver being slightly closer to the car's centerline than the passenger.

At launch, the only model available was the Berlinetta. The Spider (convertible version), and the GTS (targa top model) were introduced in 1995. In 1997, the Formula One-style electrohydraulic-operated automated manual paddle-shift transmission was introduced and the cars equipped with this transmission were called 355 F1. The F355 was the last in the series of mid-engine Ferrari models with the Flying Buttress rear window, a lineage going back to the 1965 Dino 206 GT, unveiled at the Paris Auto Show.

The nomenclature does not follow the formula from the previous decades, i.e., engine capacity (in litres) followed by the number of cylinders (e.g. 246 = 2.4 litres, 6 cylinders, 308 = 3.0 litres, 8 cylinders, etc.). In naming the F355, Ferrari used engine capacity followed by the number of valves per cylinder (355 = 3.5 litre engine capacity and 5 valves per cylinder) to bring the performance advances introduced by a 5-valve per cylinder configuration into the forefront.

== Variants ==
=== F355 Berlinetta ===
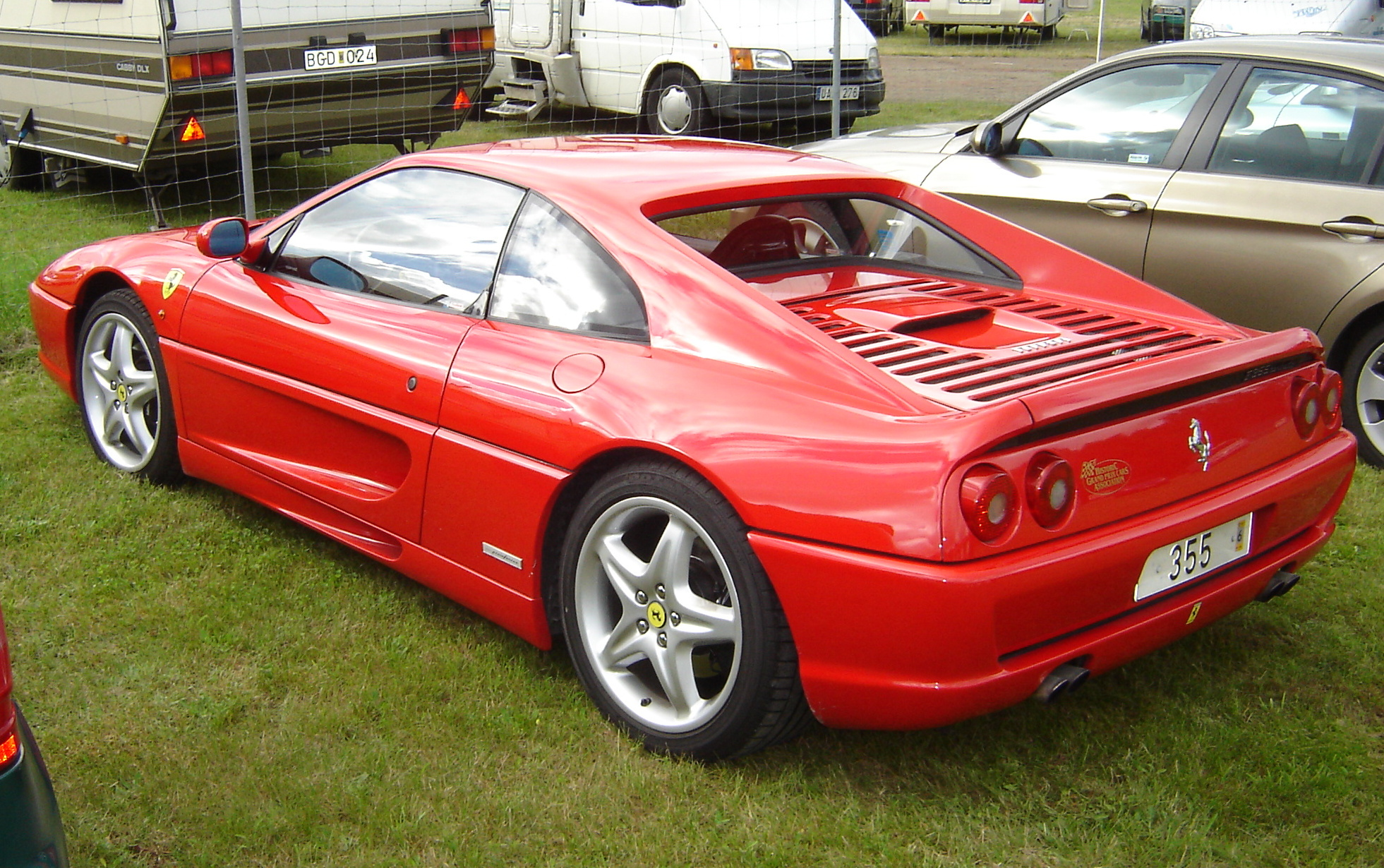
Ferrari F355 Berlinetta

The Berlinetta was introduced in May 1994, as the first in a successful series of F355 models. Initially, the 6-speed manual was the only transmission available. However, in 1997, the Berlinetta was the first-ever road car to be equipped with the innovative F1-style gearbox management system. Derived directly from Formula 1, where it made its debut in 1989 resulting in a win at the Brazilian Grand Prix, the electro-hydraulic system was operated by paddles behind the steering wheel using the F355's conventional 6-speed manual gearbox. The new transmission guaranteed faster gear changes, with the additional advantage that both of the driver's hands could stay on the wheel at all times.

Ferrari produced 4,871 road-going Berlinetta models during the entire production run, of which 3,829 were equipped with the 6-speed manual and 1,042 with F1 transmissions.

=== F355 Spider ===
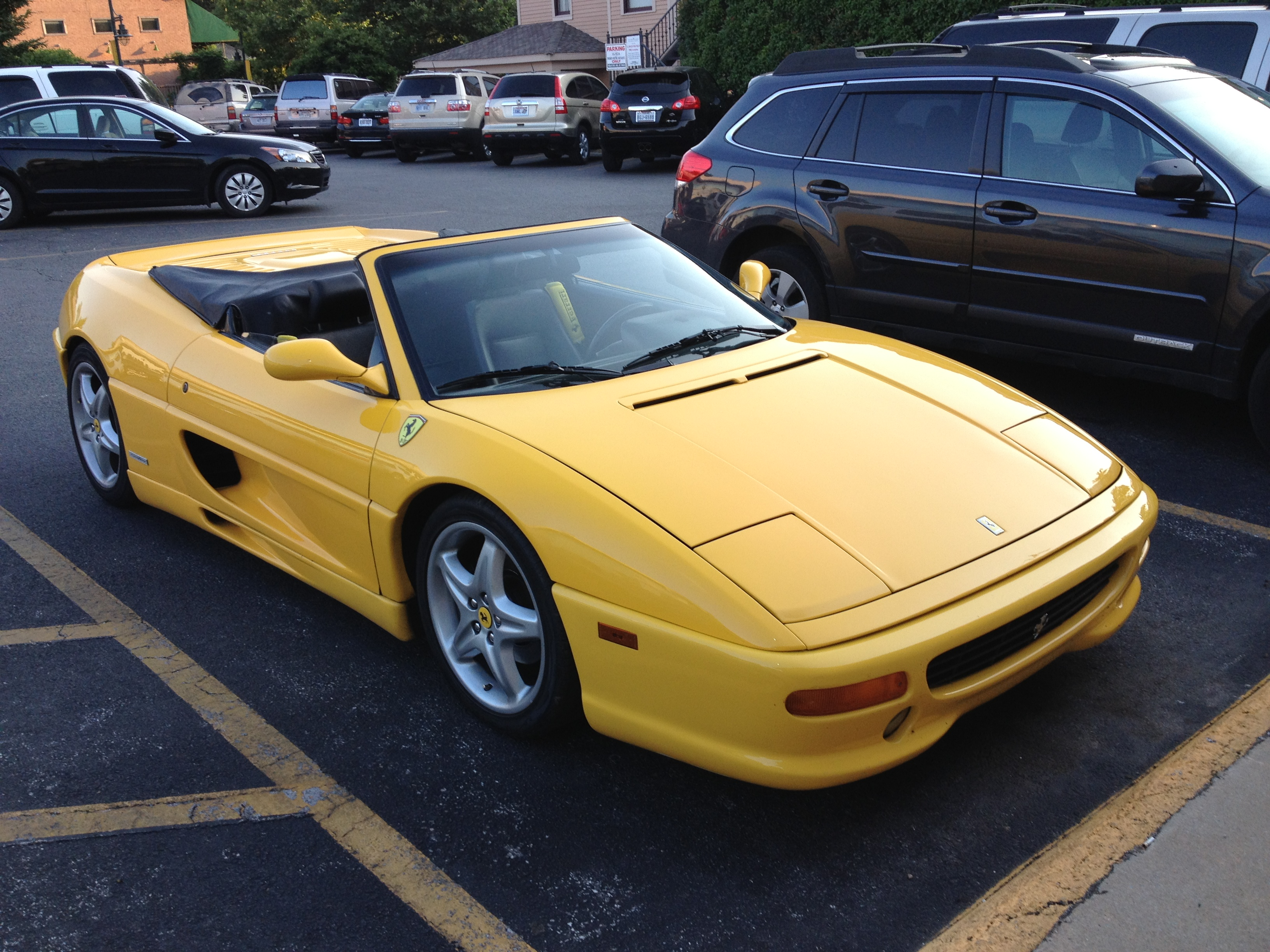
Yellow Ferrari F355 Spider

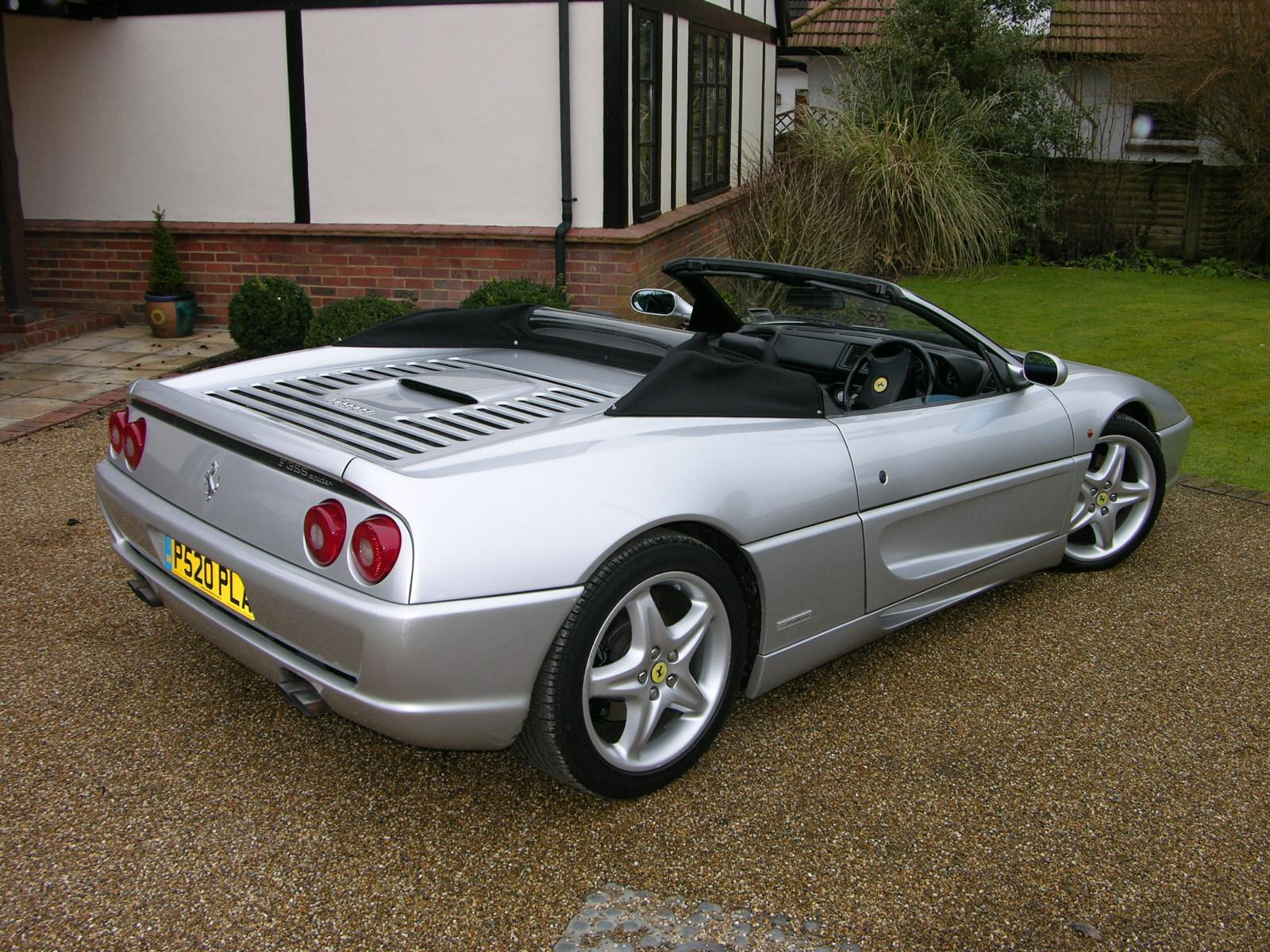
Grey Ferrari F355 Spider

The F355 Spider debuted in 1995, its Pininfarina-penned lines honed by 1,800 hours in the wind tunnel, resulted in a blend of elegant style and aerodynamic performance. For the first time on a Ferrari automobile, the automated manual soft-top was powered electronically. Initially, the Spider was offered with the 6-speed manual transmission. In 1997, the Spider was offered with the F1 transmission available as an option. The Spider proved to be the second-most popular F355 model, with a total production of 3,717 units, of which 2,664 were produced with the 6-speed manual transmission and 1,053 were produced with the F1 transmission.

=== F355 GTS ===
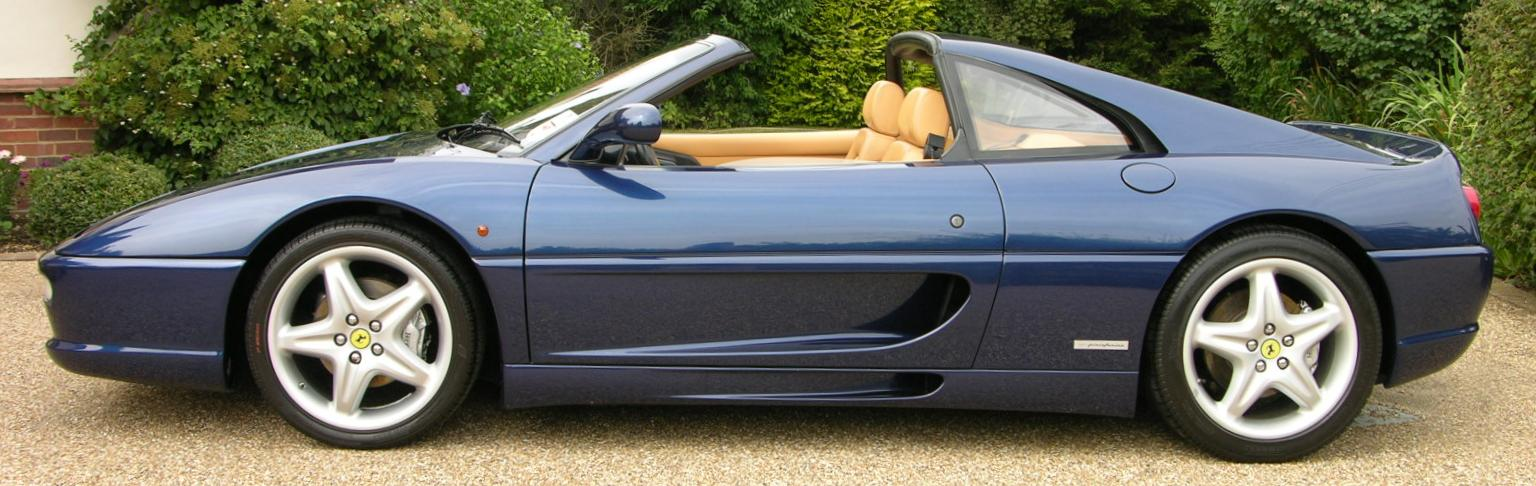
Ferrari F355 GTS (with the hard top removed)

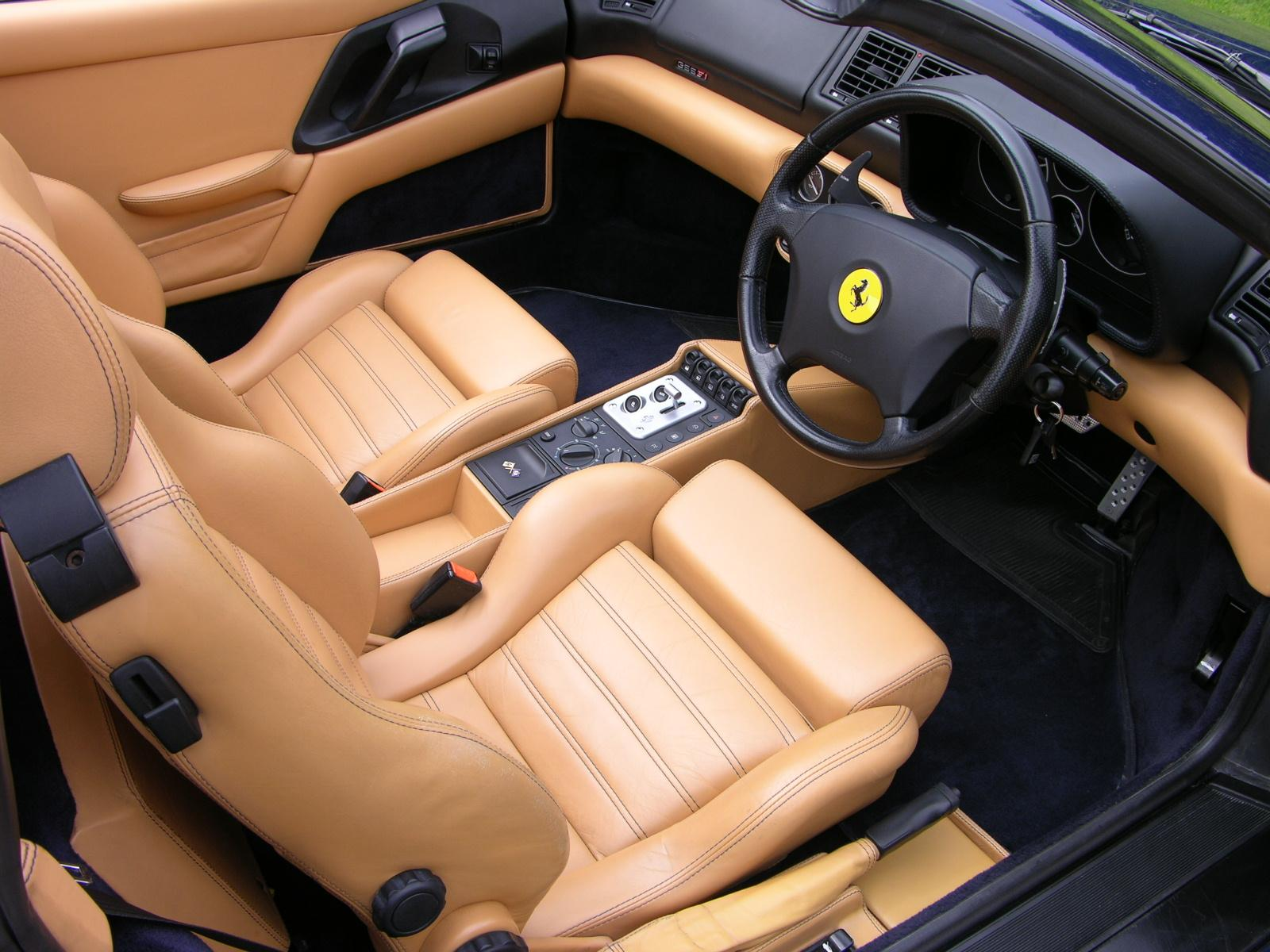
Interior with paddle-shift F1 automated manual transmission

In 1995, Ferrari introduced the GTS model to the F355 family. The GTS model was based on the Berlinetta but offered a removable "targa-style" hardtop roof, which could be stored behind the seats. Other specifications were identical to the Berlinetta. A total of 2,577 GTS models were produced, with 2,048 delivered with the 6-speed manual transmission and another 529 with the F1 transmission.

=== F355 Challenge ===
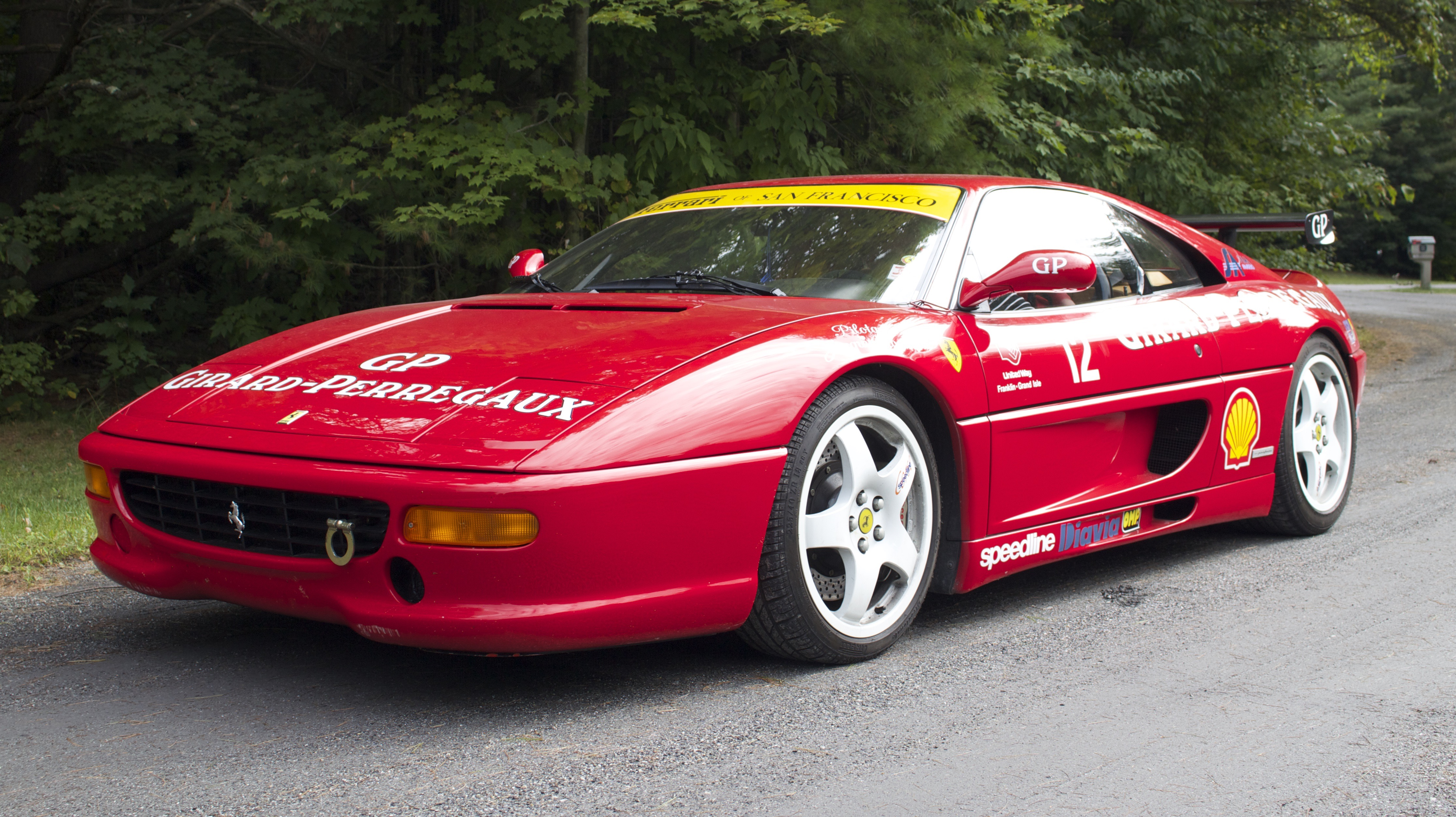
Red Ferrari F355 Challenge

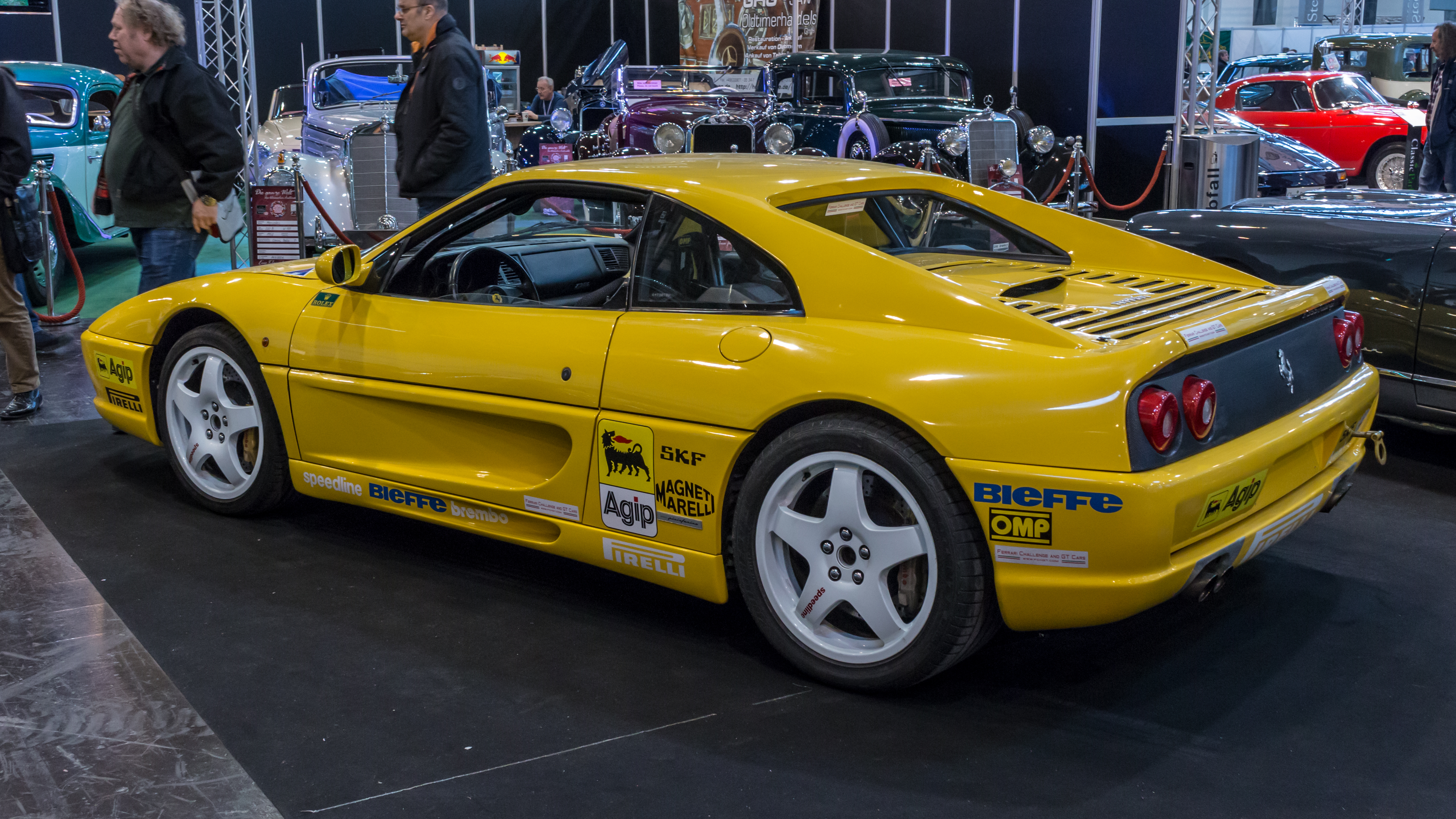
Yellow Ferrari F355 Challenge

In 1995, Ferrari introduced a race-ready F355 Challenge model for use specifically in the Ferrari Challenge race series. The Ferrari F355 Challenge model was developed by starting with a standard Ferrari F355 Berlinetta and modifying it with a US$30,000 factory-to-dealer supplied kit. The initial 1995 cars came with factory fitted cage mounts and without carpets. Each year, the cars arrived with more and more factory fitted race parts, culminating in 1998 with full-evolution cars which were supplied as virtually complete race cars except for some parts such as the rear wing, which still needed to be fitted by the dealer.

The kit initially was more substantial than the 348 Challenge and the engine, gearbox, and shock-absorbers were sealed with special tags to prevent unauthorized modifications. The kit included the following components/modifications:

- Roll-cage
- Racing bucket seats
- Safety harnesses
- Fire extinguisher
- Engine cut-off switch
- Manual radiator fan control and upgraded fans
- Competition steering wheel
- Lightweight exhaust
- Rear wing
- Competition clutch
- Upgraded 14-inch Brembo brakes (carried over from the F40)
- 18-inch Speedline magnesium wheels
- Pirelli racing slicks
- Solid suspension bushings and competition springs
- Front and Rear brake cooling ducts
- Challenge black perforated rear grille (halfway through the 1995 season to get extra air through the engine-bay)
- Lightened front bumper
- Front and rear tow hooks

The F355 Challenge shares the same engine and physical dimensions as the standard F355 Berlinetta. A total of 108 cars were produced, all of which were equipped with the 6-speed manual transmission. Although some sources indicate that over 300 cars were subject to the Challenge conversion, yet this claim remains unproven. There were 18 RHD cars imported by Ferrari UK and modified by MHT. A further 10 were sold to the rest of the RHD markets. Making the total number to only 28 RHD models. These RHD models become extremely rare and valuable. Some of these rare cars are located in Indonesia, Australia, Japan, and only one known example in South Africa. Each F355 Challenge has an emblem on the rear that specifically denotes the "F355 Challenge."

=== Limited Edition Fiorano ===
For the 1999 model year, Ferrari introduced a limited production of F355 Spider models designated, "Serie Fiorano". Launched in March 1999, this limited production run of 100 planned units (104 actually produced) included a number of enhancements increasing the track performance much closer to the Challenge versions:

- Competizione-derived Fiorano suspension pack, featuring wide track, stiffer springs, a thicker anti-roll bar
- Drilled and ventilated brake discs and competition brake pads
- Competizione-sourced steering rack
- Challenge rear grilles and enameled Scuderia Ferrari shields
- Carbon-fibre inserts (normally only available as expensive special order options): centre console, door sills, and paddle-shifters
- Suede-covered steering wheel

There were 100 Serie Fiorano units delivered to the U.S. market, 74 with the F1 paddle-shift transmission and 26 with the 6-speed manual. An additional 4 units were produced beyond the planned production for the U.S., with only 3 European models and one unit destined for South Africa. The American units were delivered with a numbered plaque affixed to the dashboard while the 3 Fioranos delivered to Europe had no numbered plaque.

==== Serie Fiorano Chassis Numbers ====
- 355 spider Fiorano F1 (US model) 74 ex (sn 115426 - 116799)
- 355 spider Fiorano manual (US model) 26 ex (sn 116291 - 116579)
- 355 spider Fiorano F1 (EURO model) 3 ex (sn 116194, 116201 and 116489)
- 355 spider Fiorano F1 (South Africa model) 1 ex (sn 115624)

=== Fiorano Handling Pack ===
Although not a limited-edition model, a "Fiorano Handling Pack" was offered as a track-focused factory option upgrade to the F355s & 355 F1s in Europe built in the final year of production, featuring upgrades straight from the Challenge Evo parts bin. The Fiorano Handling Pack (FHP) included quick-steering rack and pump, lowered ride height, uprated springs, wider track, thicker anti-roll bars, Challenge EVO suspension ECU and upgraded brake pads with red callipers and drilled discs specifically for the road car.

The little-known Ferrari F355 "Fiorano" was the first ‘Challenge’-inspired track-focused V8 Ferrari road car.

So few buyers ordered their cars with the Fiorano Handling Package that less than 2% of production had this specified and only 0.3% were manual. In the UK, only seven F355s with a manual gearbox and the FHPS were delivered to the UK market: four Berlinettas, zero GTS and three Spiders. This makes a manual F355 Fiorano Berlinetta as rare as a manual 599.

== Performance ==
Manufacturer performance claims

- Max. power: 380 PS (375 hp; 279 kW) at 8,250 rpm
- Specific output: 107.2 HP/L
- Max. torque: 363 N⋅m (268 lb⋅ft) at 6,000 rpm
- 0–100 km/h (0–62 mph): 4.7 seconds
- 0–161 km/h (0–100 mph): 10.8 seconds
- 0–400 m: 12.9 seconds
- 0–1,000 m: 23.7 seconds
- Top speed: 295 km/h (183 mph) (past redline limit)

Independently tested performance

- 0 to 97 km/h (60 mph): 4.5 seconds
- 0 to 161 km/h (100 mph): 11.2 seconds
- 0 to 209 km/h (130 mph): 19.1 seconds
- Rolling start, 8–97 km/h (5–60 mph): 5.5 seconds
- Top gear, 48–80 km/h (30–50 mph): 7.9 seconds
- Top gear, 80–113 km/h (50–70 mph): 8.2 seconds
- Standing 1/4-mile: 13.0 seconds at 177 km/h (110 mph)
- Top speed (redline limited): 288 km/h (179 mph)
- Braking, 113 km/h (70 mph)–0: 156 ft (48 m)
- Roadholding, 300-ft-diameter skidpad: 0.98 g

== Production ==
Total production of 11,273 units made the F355 the most-produced Ferrari at the time. This sales record would be surpassed by its successor, the 360 and later, the F430.

== Recall ==
In November 2009, Ferrari recalled about 2,400 1995–99 355s and 355 F1s in the United States because of improperly placed screw clamps that could damage the fuel-supply pipes and allow fuel to leak into the engine compartment. Ferrari learned of the problem when it was sued over a fire involving an injury to a driver.
