= Downforce =

Downwards lift force created by the aerodynamic characteristics of a vehicle

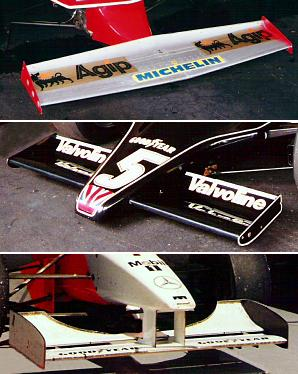
Three different styles of front wings from three different Formula One eras, all designed to produce downforce at the front end of the respective race cars. Top to bottom: Ferrari 312T4 (1979), Lotus 79 (1978), McLaren MP4/11 (1996)

Downforce is a downwards lift force created by the aerodynamic features of a vehicle. If the vehicle is a car, the purpose of downforce is to allow the car to travel faster by increasing the vertical force on the tires, thus creating more grip. If the vehicle is a fixed-wing aircraft, the purpose of the downforce on the horizontal stabilizer is to maintain longitudinal stability and allow the pilot to control the aircraft in pitch.

== Fundamental principles ==
The same principle that allows an airplane to rise off the ground by creating lift from its wings is used in reverse to apply force that presses the race car against the surface of the track. This effect is referred to as "aerodynamic grip" and is distinguished from "mechanical grip", which is a function of the car's mass, tires, and suspension. The creation of downforce by passive devices can be achieved only at the cost of increased aerodynamic drag (or friction), and the optimum setup is almost always a compromise between the two.

The aerodynamic setup for a car can vary considerably between race tracks, depending on the length of the straights and the types of corners. Because it is a function of the flow of air over and under the car, downforce increases with the square of the car's speed and requires a certain minimum speed in order to produce a significant effect. Some cars have had rather unstable aerodynamics, such that a minor change in angle of attack or height of the vehicle can cause large changes in downforce. In the very worst cases this can cause the car to experience lift, not downforce; for example, by passing over a bump on a track or slipstreaming over a crest: this could have some disastrous consequences, such as Mark Webber's and Peter Dumbreck's Mercedes-Benz CLR in the 1999 24 Hours of Le Mans, which flipped spectacularly after closely following a competitor car over a hump.

Two primary components of a racing car can be used to create downforce when the car is travelling at racing speed:

- the shape of the body, and
- the use of airfoils.

Most racing formulae have a ban on aerodynamic devices that can be adjusted during a race, except during pit stops.

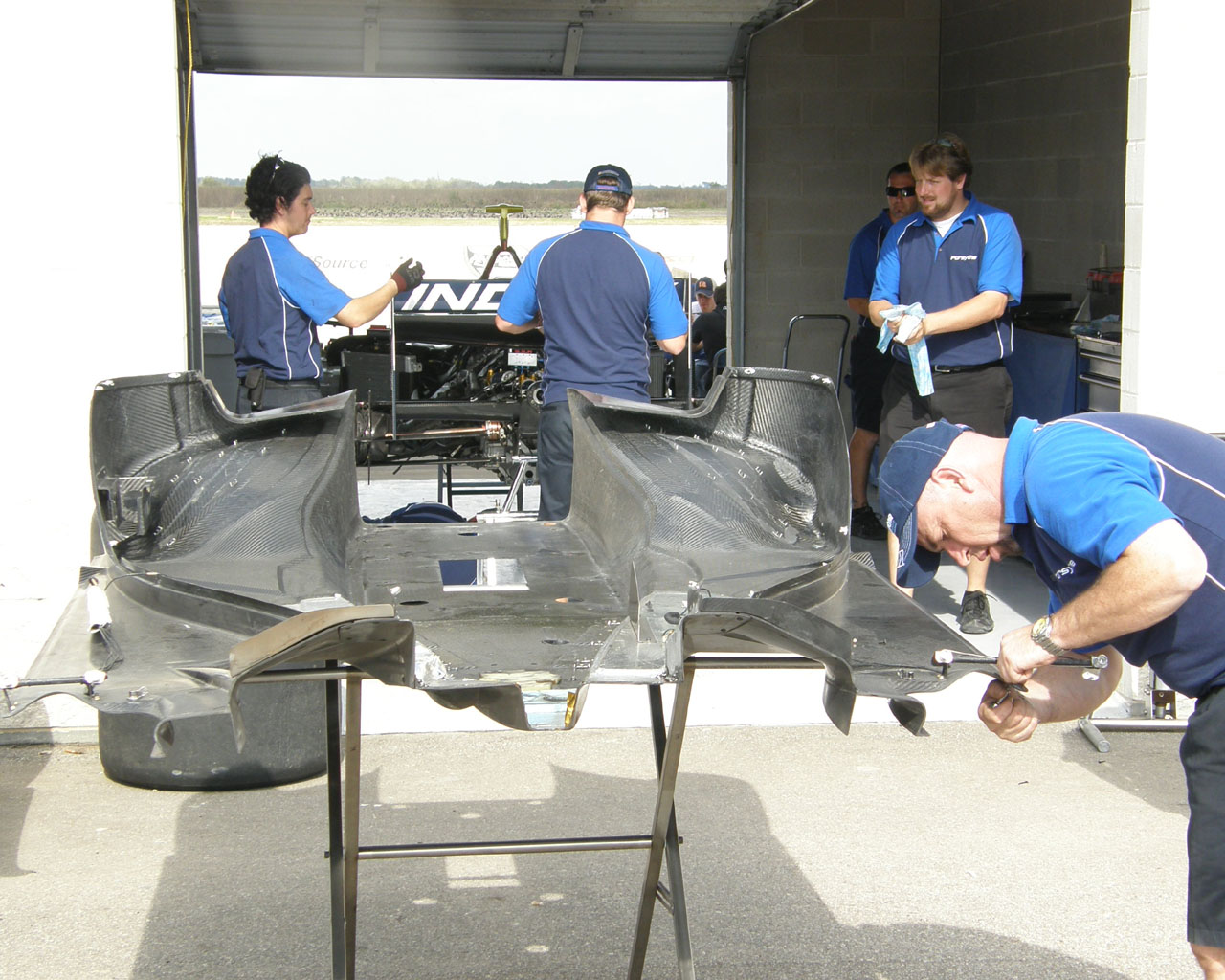
The CFRP floor of the Panoz DP01 ChampCar exhibiting complex aerodynamic design.

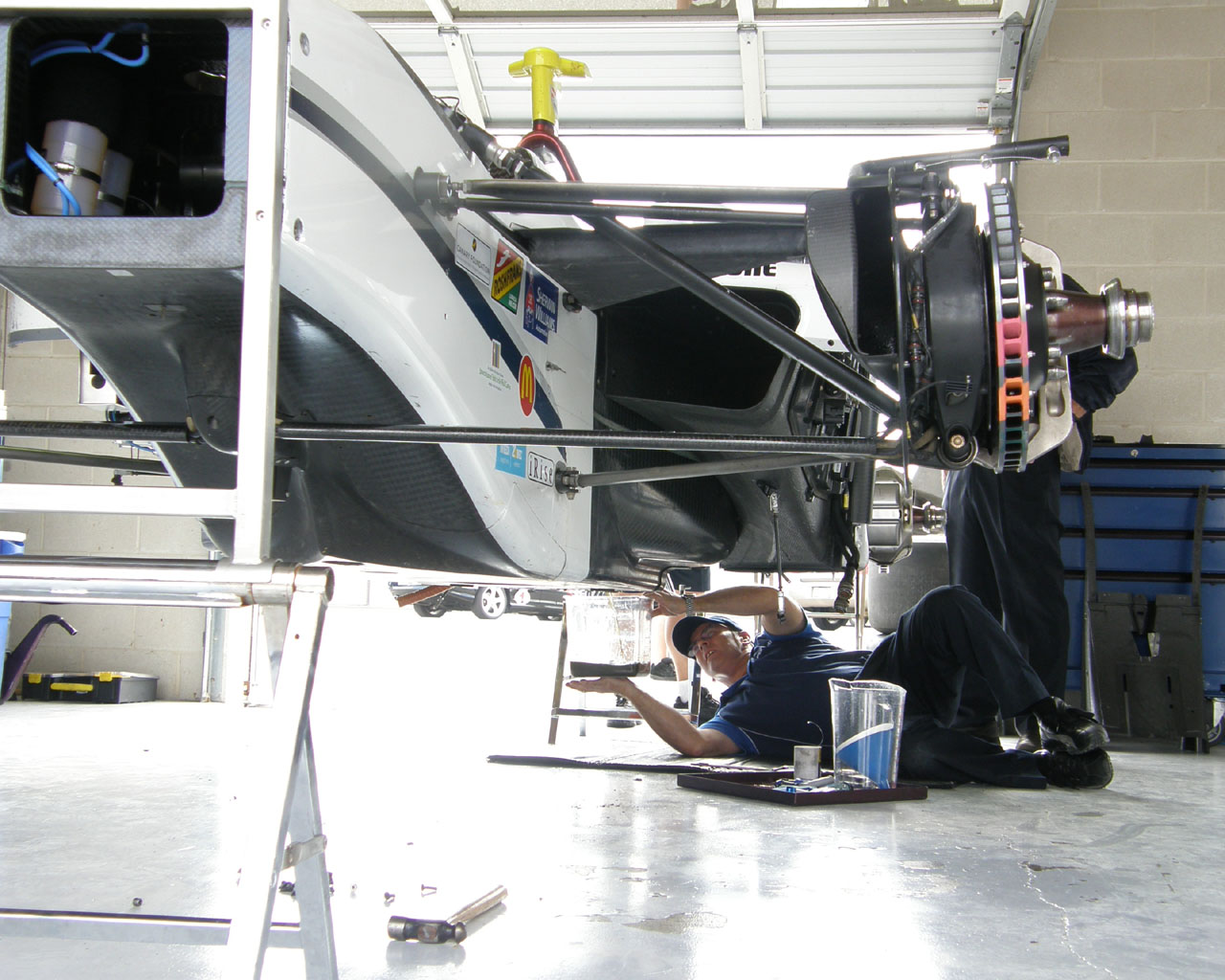
The underside curves of the Panoz DP01 Champ Car.

The downforce exerted by a wing is usually expressed as a function of its lift coefficient:

$$F = -C_L \frac{1}{2} \rho v^2 A$$

where:

- F is downforce (SI unit: newtons)
- C_{L} is the lift coefficient
- ρ is air density (SI unit: kg/m^{3})
- v is velocity (SI unit: m/s)
- A is the area of the wing (SI unit: meters squared), which depends on its wingspan and chord if using top wing area basis for C_{L}, or the wingspan and thickness of the wing if using frontal area basis

In certain ranges of operating conditions and when the wing is not stalled, the lift coefficient has a constant value: the downforce is then proportional to the square of airspeed.

In aerodynamics, it is usual to use the top-view projected area of the wing as a reference surface to define the lift coefficient.

== Body ==
The rounded and tapered shape of the top of a car is designed to slice through the air and minimize wind resistance. Detailed pieces of bodywork on top of the car can be added to allow a smooth flow of air to reach the downforce-creating elements (e.g., wings or spoilers, and underbody tunnels).

The overall shape of a car resembles an airplane wing. Almost all road cars produce aerodynamic lift as a result of this shape. There are many techniques that are used to counterbalance this lift. Looking at the profile of most road cars, the front bumper has the lowest ground clearance followed by the section between the front and rear tires, and followed by a rear bumper, usually with the highest clearance. Using this layout, the air flowing under the front bumper will be constricted to a lower cross-sectional area, and thus achieve a lower pressure. Additional downforce comes from the rake (or angle) of the vehicle's body, which directs the underside air up and creates a downward force, increasing the pressure on top of the car because the airflow direction comes closer to perpendicular to the surface.

Volume does not affect the air pressure because it is not an enclosed volume, despite the common misconception. Race cars amplify this effect by adding a rear diffuser to accelerate air under the car in front of the diffuser, and raise the air pressure behind it, lessening the car's wake. Other aerodynamic components that can be found on the underside to improve downforce and/or reduce drag, include splitters and vortex generators.

Some cars, such as the DeltaWing, do not have wings, and generate all of their downforce through their body.

== Airfoils ==
The magnitude of the downforce created by the wings or spoilers on a car is dependent primarily on three things:

- The shape, including surface area, aspect ratio and cross-section of the device,
- The device's orientation (or angle of attack), and
- The speed of the vehicle.

A larger surface area creates greater downforce and greater drag. The aspect ratio is the width of the airfoil divided by its chord. If the wing is not rectangular, aspect ratio is written AR=b^{2}/s, where AR=aspect ratio, b=span, and s=wing area. Also, a greater angle of attack (or tilt) of the wing or spoiler, creates more downforce, which puts more pressure on the rear wheels and creates more drag.

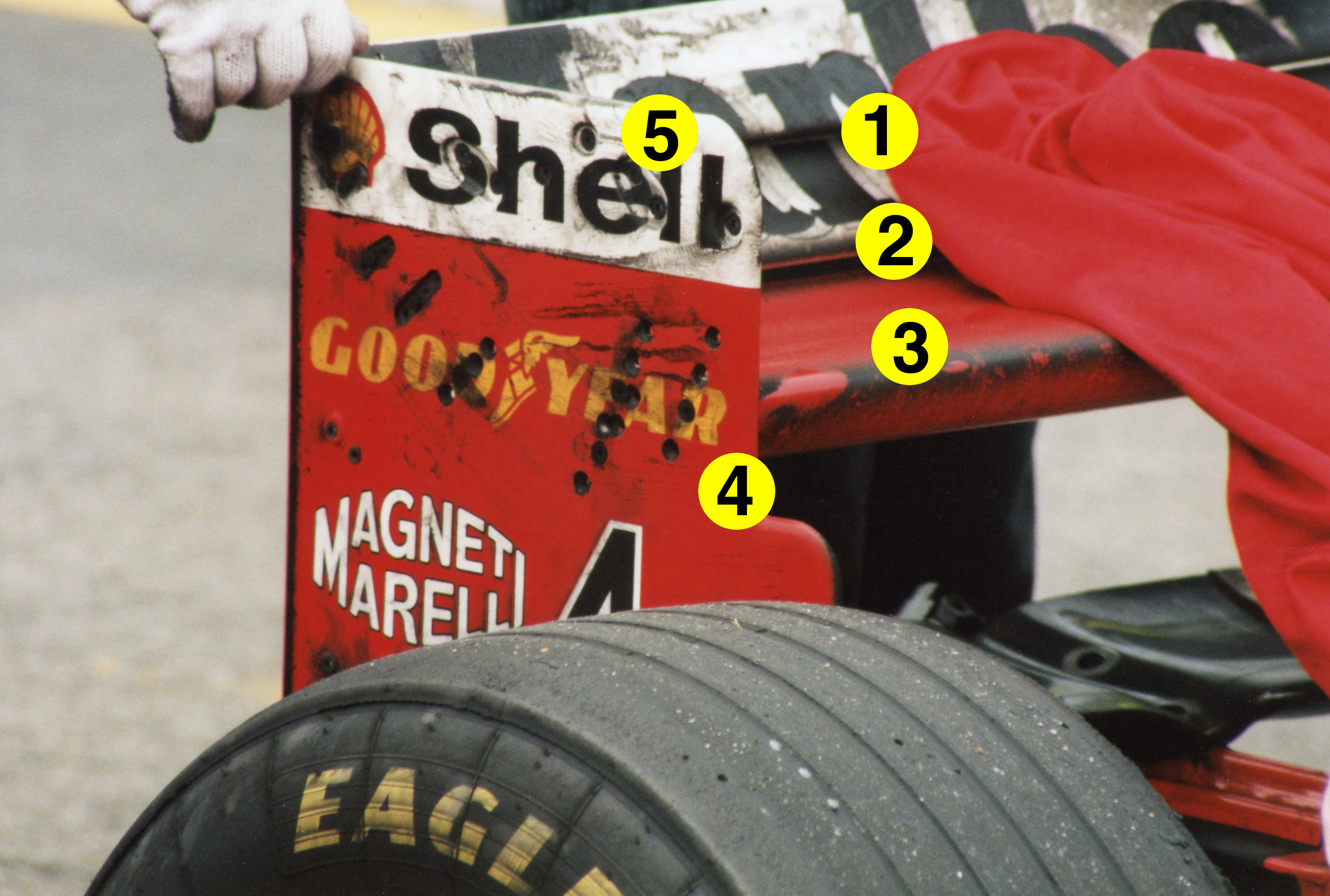
The rear wing of a 1998 Formula One car, with three aerodynamic elements (1, 2, 3). The rows of holes for adjustment of the angle of attack (4) and installation of another element (5) are visible on the wing's endplate.

=== Front ===
The function of the airfoils at the front of the car is twofold. They create downforce that enhances the grip of the front tires, while also optimizing (or minimizing disturbance to) the flow of air to the rest of the car. The front wings on an open-wheeled car undergo constant modification as data is gathered from race to race, and are customized for every characteristic of a particular circuit (see top photos). In most series, the wings are even designed for adjustment during the race itself when the car is serviced.

=== Rear ===
The flow of air at the rear of the car is affected by the front wings, front wheels, mirrors, driver's helmet, side pods and exhaust. This causes the rear wing to be less aerodynamically efficient than the front wing, Yet, because it must generate more than twice as much downforce as the front wings in order to maintain the handling to balance the car, the rear wing typically has a much larger aspect ratio, and often uses two or more elements to compound the amount of downforce created (see photo at left). Like the front wings, each of these elements can often be adjusted when the car is serviced, before or even during a race, and are the object of constant attention and modification.

=== Wings in unusual places ===
Partly as a consequence of rules aimed at reducing downforce from the front and rear wings of F1 cars, several teams have sought to find other places to position wings. Small wings mounted on the rear of the cars' sidepods began to appear in mid-1994, and were virtually standard on all F1 cars in one form or another, until all such devices were outlawed in 2009. Other wings have sprung up in various other places about the car, but these modifications are usually only used at circuits where downforce is most sought, particularly the twisty Hungary and Monaco racetracks.

The 1995 McLaren Mercedes MP4/10 was one of the first cars to feature a "midwing", using a loophole in the regulations to mount a wing on top of the engine cover. This arrangement has since been used by every team on the grid at one time or another, and in the 2007 Monaco Grand Prix all but two teams used them. These midwings are not to be confused either with the roll-hoop mounted cameras which each car carries as standard in all races, or with the bull-horn shaped flow controllers first used by McLaren and since by BMW Sauber, whose primary function is to smooth and redirect the airflow in order to make the rear wing more effective rather than to generate downforce themselves.

A variation on this theme was "X-wings", high wings mounted on the front of the sidepods which used a similar loophole to midwings. These were first used by Tyrrell in 1997, and were last used in the 1998 San Marino Grand Prix, by which time Ferrari, Sauber, Jordan and others had used such an arrangement. However it was decided they would have to be banned in view of the obstruction they caused during refueling and the risk they posed to the driver should a car roll over.

Various other extra wings have been tried from time to time, but nowadays it is more common for teams to seek to improve the performance of the front and rear wings by the use of various flow controllers such as the afore-mentioned "bull-horns" used by McLaren.

== See also ==
- Bernoulli's principle
- Body kit
- Formula One car
- Grip (auto racing)
- Ground effect in cars
- Lift (force)
- Wind tunnel
