= Diffuser (automotive) =

Aerodynamic surface

Top: Lateral view; the red circles mark the front air dam/splitter and rear diffuser. Bottom: Rear.

A diffuser on an automobile is a shaped section of the car’s rear which improves its aerodynamic properties by enhancing the transition between the high-velocity airflow underneath the car and the much slower freestream airflow of the ambient atmosphere. It works by providing a space for the underbody airflow to decelerate and expand (in volume, as density is assumed to be constant at the speeds that cars travel) so that it does not cause excessive flow separation and drag, by providing a degree of "wake infill" or more accurately, pressure recovery. The diffuser itself accelerates the flow in front of it, which helps generate downforce. This is achieved by creating a change in velocity of the air flowing under the diffuser by giving it a rake angle which in turn generates a change in pressure and hence increases downforce.

== Overview ==
When a diffuser is used, the air flows into the underbody from the front of the car, accelerates and reduces pressure. There is a suction peak at the transition of the flat bottom and diffuser. This transition is where the lowest pressure generally is located and is called the throat of the diffuser. The diffuser then eases this high velocity air back to normal velocity and also helps fill in the area behind the car making the whole underbody a more efficient downforce producing device by reducing drag on the car. The diffuser also imparts upward momentum to the air which further increases downforce.

The trailing or leading edge of a diffuser may receive a nolder—a precise small lip, protuberance or wing to enhance its performance.

=== Operation (rear diffuser) ===
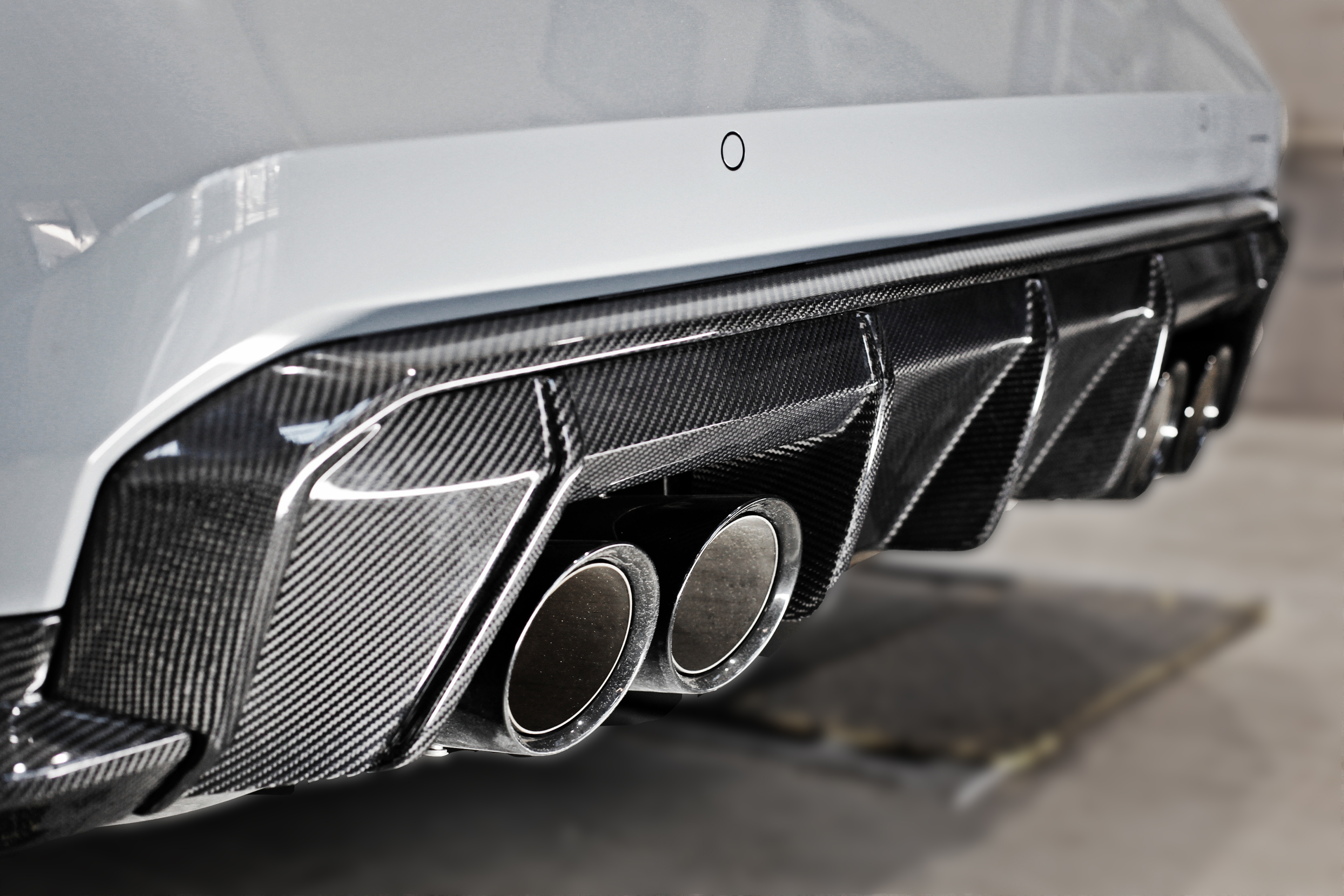
A diffuser on BMW G82 M4. Most diffusers are produced for sports cars, so they are made with lightweight dry carbon fiber with a high-pressure heat process.

The aft part of a car underbody is where a rear diffuser is usually located. It works by accelerating the velocity of the airflow underneath the car. At the diffuser exit station the air flow is at the same pressure and speed of the ambient. Since its geometry is expanding the rear region, the exit area is much bigger than the inlet, so for the conservation of mass principle the air flow will have a much bigger speed at the diffuser inlet and as a consequence under the whole car underbody. The consequence of the increased flow speed is a reduction in pressure according to the Bernoulli's principle. Since the pressure below the car is lower than on the side and above the car, downforce is produced if implemented correctly.

Front diffusers also exist (especially on Le Mans Prototypes or similar cars); however, they generate downforce purely from momentum exchange with the air, as there is nothing ahead of them to drive. A poorly designed front diffuser can create a low pressure region toward the front of the car which slows the air behind it down and reduces the effectiveness of the rest of the underbody. Front diffusers usually route air away from the car so that it doesn't affect the rest of the underbody. The air can be vented through a channel or expelled near the front wheels.

Injecting the exhaust into the rear diffuser can also help extract the air from below the car. The exhaust gasses effectively energize the boundary layer, helping to raise the pressure of the low-pressure, fast-moving airstream back to the ambient atmospheric pressure at the exit of the diffuser. This fast-moving air helps evacuate the diffuser more quickly, which helps drop the pressure at the underbody. However, this makes the diffuser rather sensitive to engine speed. When the driver lifts off the throttle, the exhaust flow is greatly reduced, which makes the diffuser less effective, robbing the vehicle of downforce. Thus, handling is negatively affected.

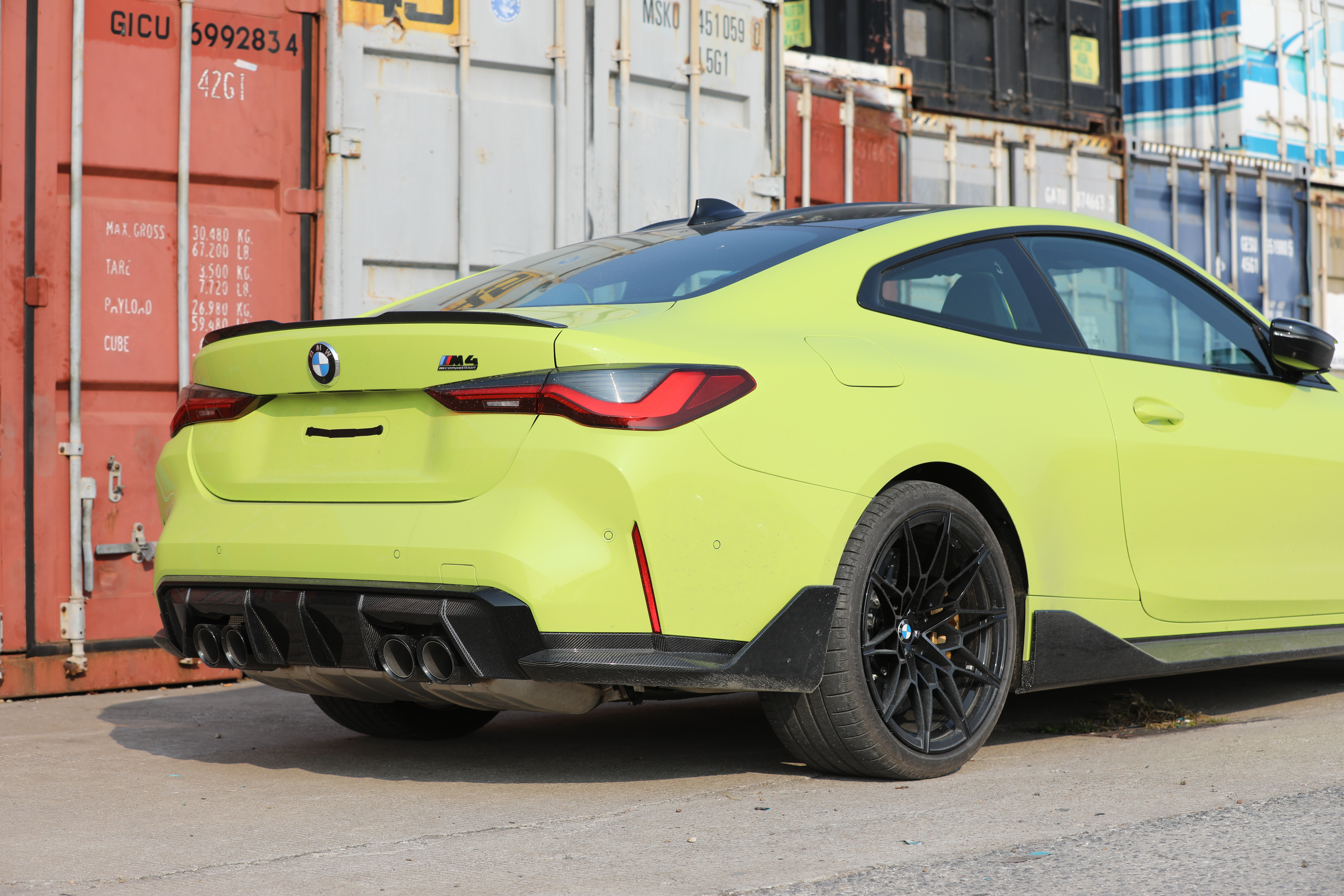
Rear splitter and diffuser on BMW M4.

The car's bodywork also interacts with the flow through the diffuser. In addition to creating downforce, the front wing and nose try to keep "clean air" flowing around, and more importantly under, the car. Clean air under the car prevents flow separation from occurring in the diffuser, which would severely rob its performance. The rear wing also affects the diffuser. When the wing is mounted low and close to the diffuser, the low pressure under the wing helps suck air through the diffuser. Cars, such as the Toyota Eagle MkIII and the Jaguar XJR-14 employed two-tier wings to enhance this effect. One profile was mounted high, in order to hit relatively clean air. The other profile was mounted almost flush with the bodywork behind the chassis. This wing's profile is used to drive the diffuser, creating that low pressure area to help move air from the underbody. According to Hiro Fujimori, aerodynamicist for the Toyota Eagle MkIII project, this bi-plane wing produced 18% more downforce for the same drag than a normal wing. Conversely, equal downforce levels could be attained for significantly reduced drag with this "Red Baron" wing.

=== Multi-deck diffusers ===
In 2009, the Formula 1 grid was embroiled in controversy. The culprit was the so-called double-decker diffuser introduced at first by Brawn GP, WilliamsF1, and Toyota Racing, but later put into use by every team. These three teams had exploited a loophole in the rules that allowed for more volume in the diffuser. The rules stated that the diffuser must start at a point aligned with the centerline of the rear wheels. The loophole allowed for holes in the underbody, perpendicular to the reference plane (not visible as a hole when viewed from directly above), that fed a diffuser channel that was above the main diffuser. This greatly increased the available downforce, and was worth about half a second per lap, according to Mike Gascoyne. The teams decided to allow the double-decker diffusers again for 2010. However, for 2011, the Formula 1 Technical Working Group decided to ban multi-deck diffusers.

== Splitters ==
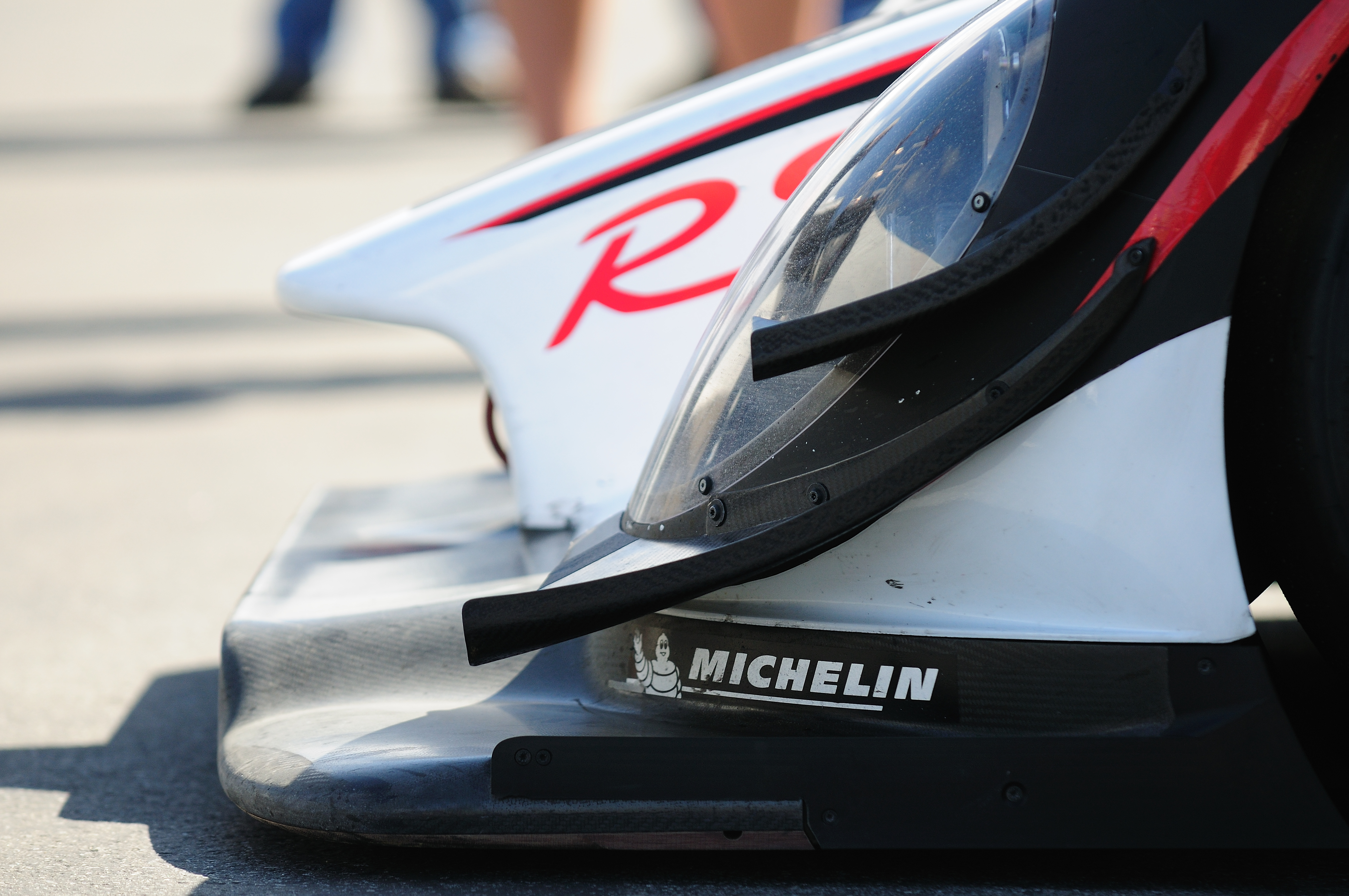
The Porsche RS Spyder Evo uses a front splitter combined with dive planes

As the front of the car slows down the air without a diffuser, this is the ideal place for an inlet. A splitter is commonly used here, serving to increase the amount of downforce at the front of the car. The airstream is brought to stagnation above the splitter by an air dam, causing an area of high pressure. Below the splitter, the air is redirected away from the stagnation zone and is accelerated, causing the pressure to drop. This, combined with the high pressure over the splitter, creates downforce. The larger the area of the splitter, the more downforce is generated. In most closed-wheel race cars, the underside of the splitter smoothly integrates with the undertray, creating one large flat plane that is driven by the rear diffuser. Some race cars, such as the Toyota GT-One, use an additional diffuser immediately behind the splitter to help create more downforce. The air extracted by this diffuser is exhausted through vents in the sidepods or above the car around the cockpit.

== Examples of diffusers and splitters ==
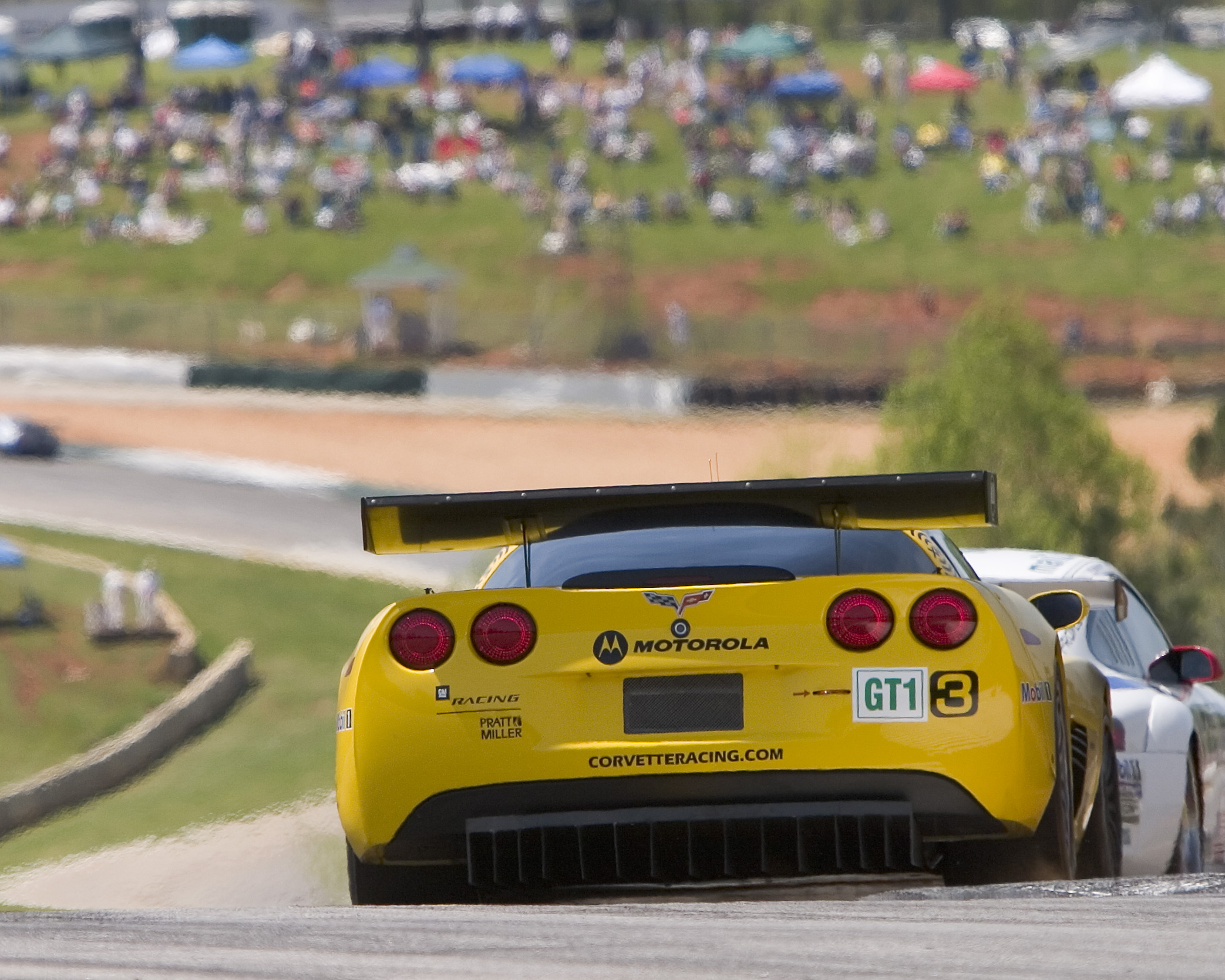
Rear diffuser protruding from below bumper on a Chevrolet Corvette C6.R. Note the strakes for keeping out tyre wake.

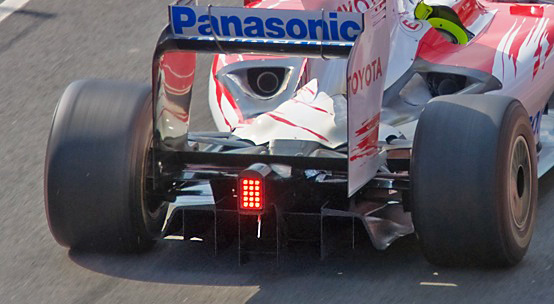
Double Decker diffuser of a Formula One car (Toyota TF109). Note channels above the main diffuser on either side of the light.

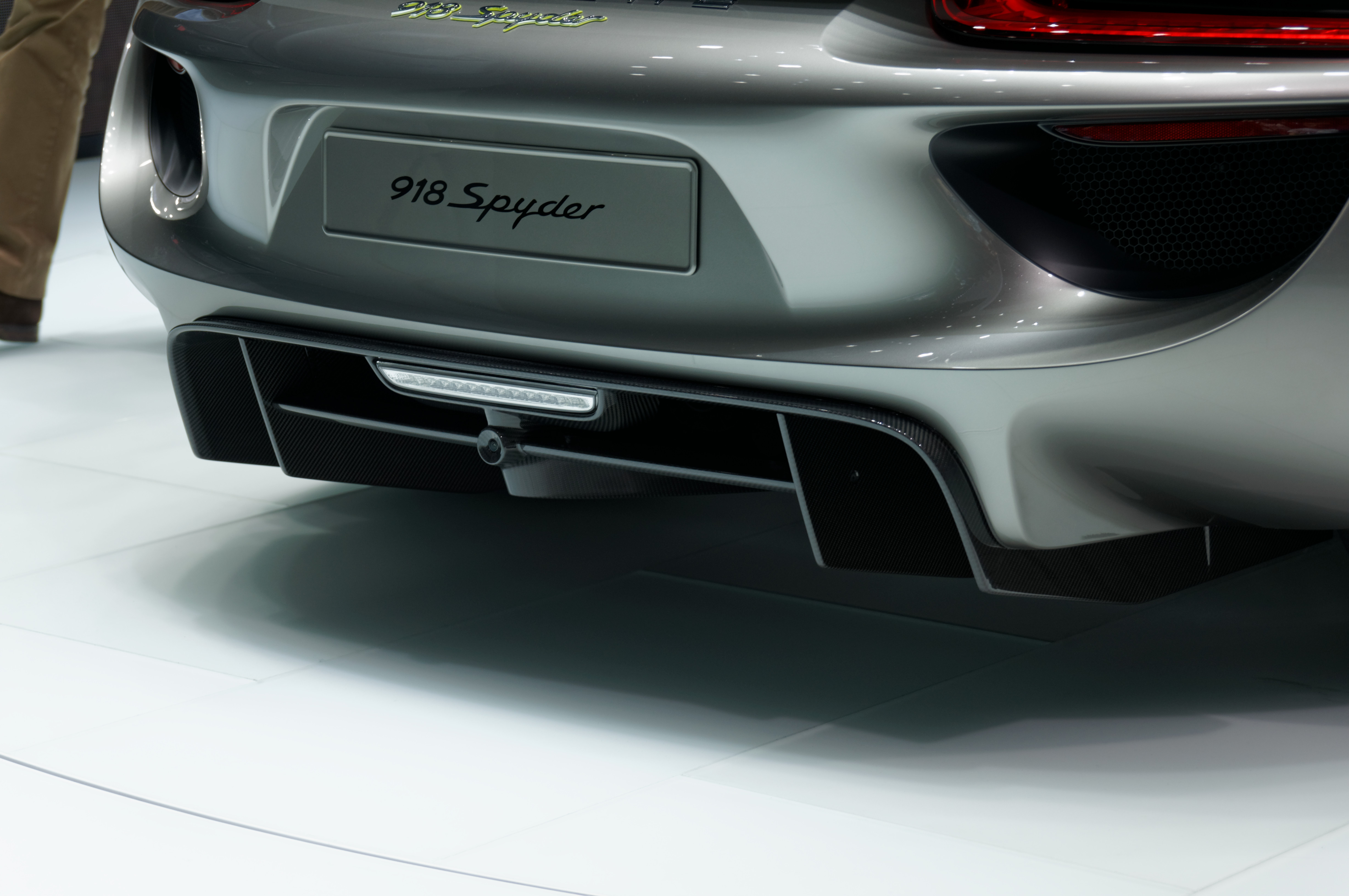
Rear diffuser visible below the license plate on a Porsche 918 Spyder.

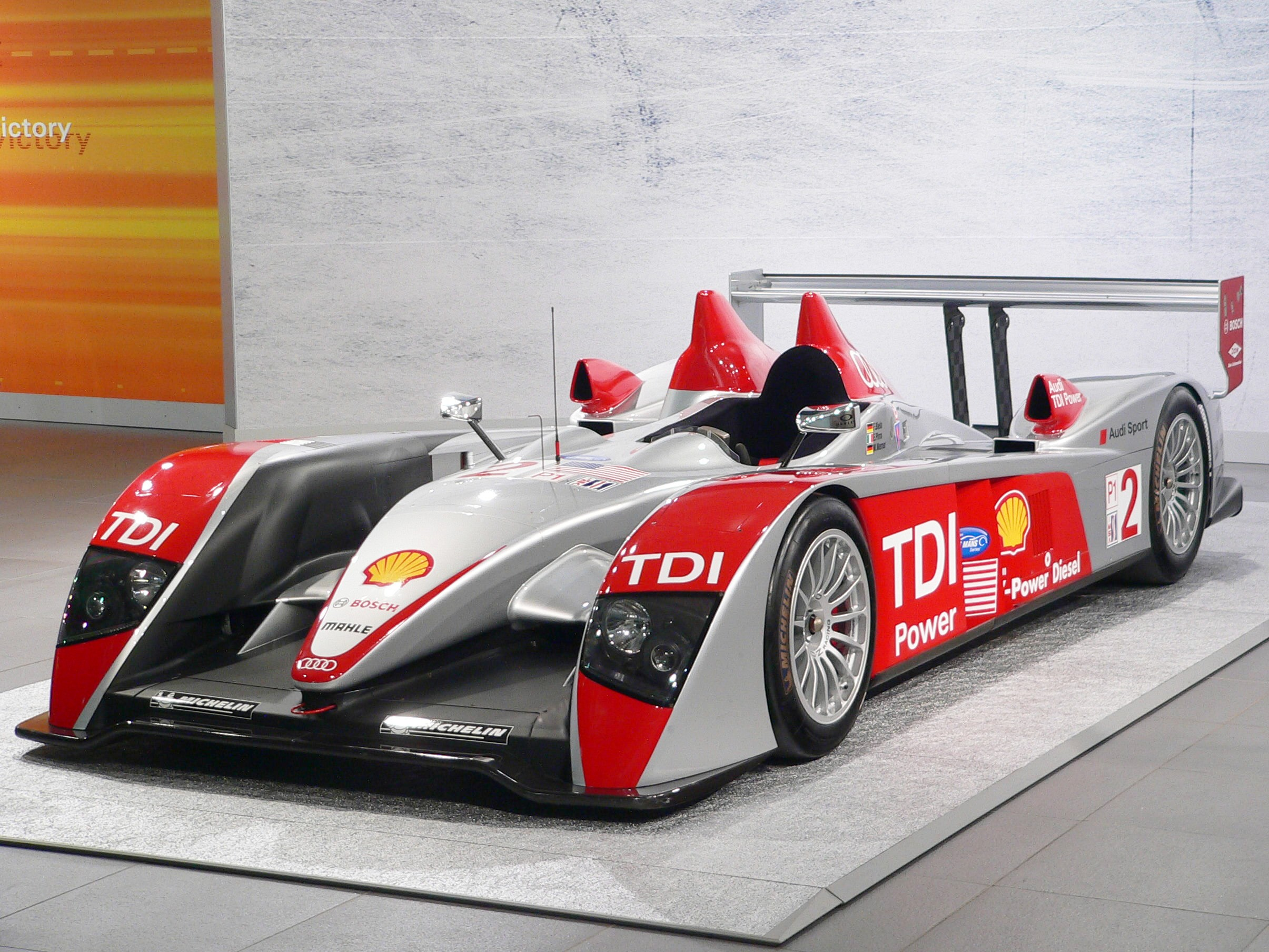
Large front splitter below nose on an Audi R10 TDI

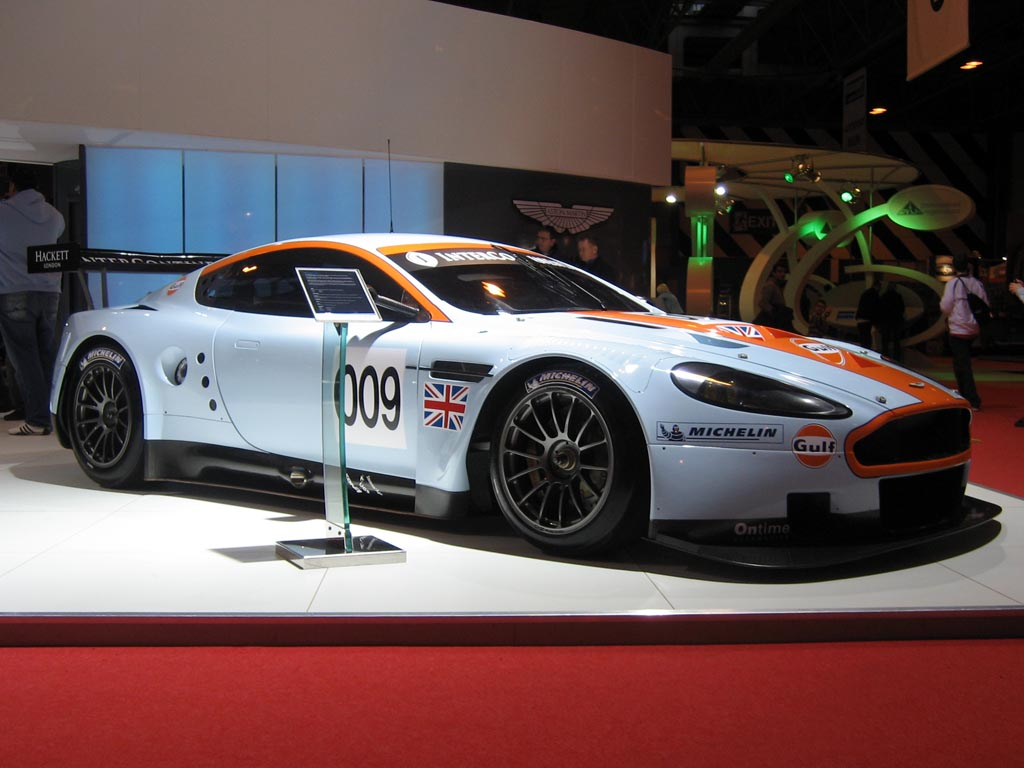
Front splitter visible below the nose on an Aston Martin DBR9

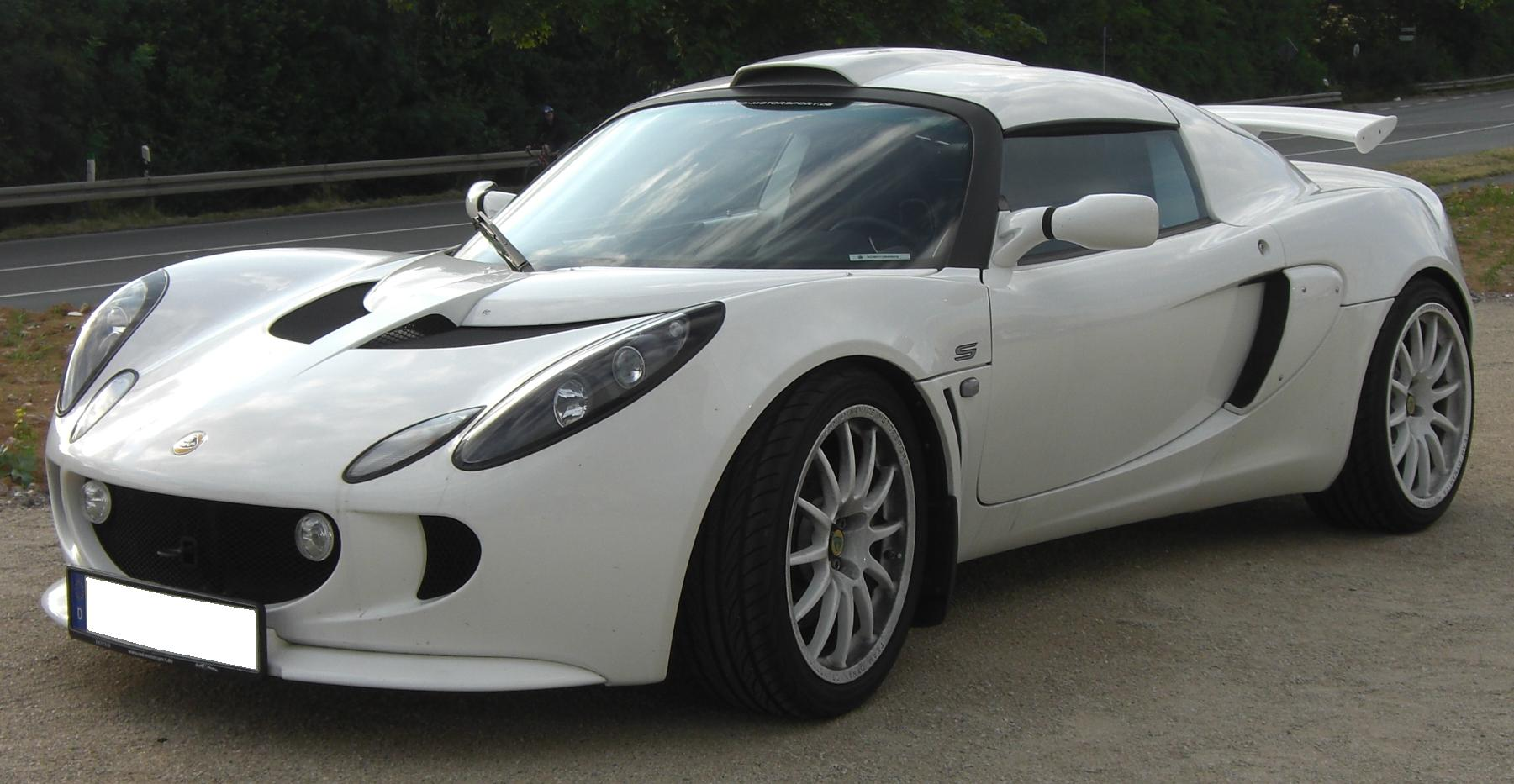
Front splitter integrated into bumper of a Lotus Exige S.

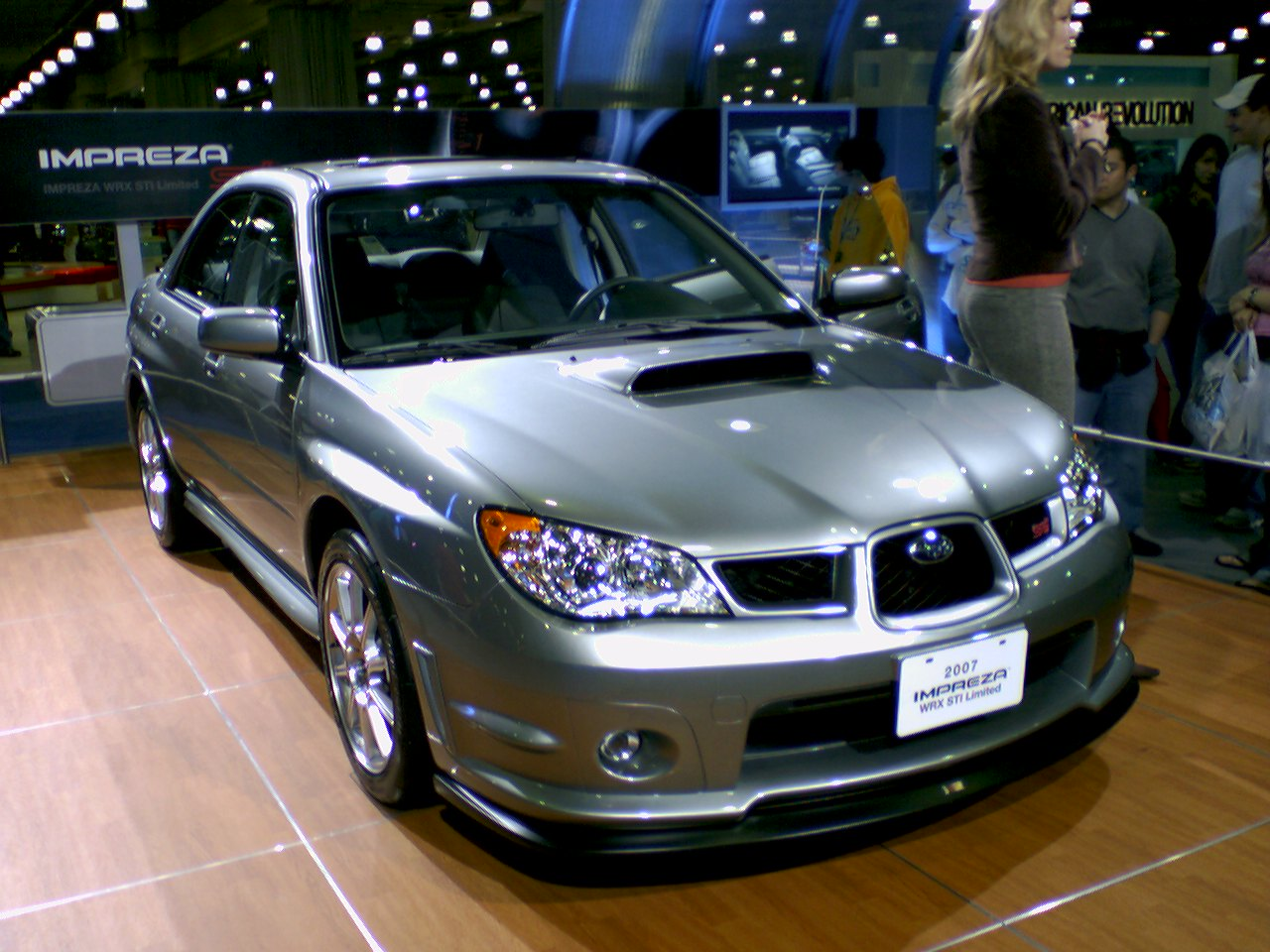
Small front splitter below the bumper of Subaru Impreza WRX.

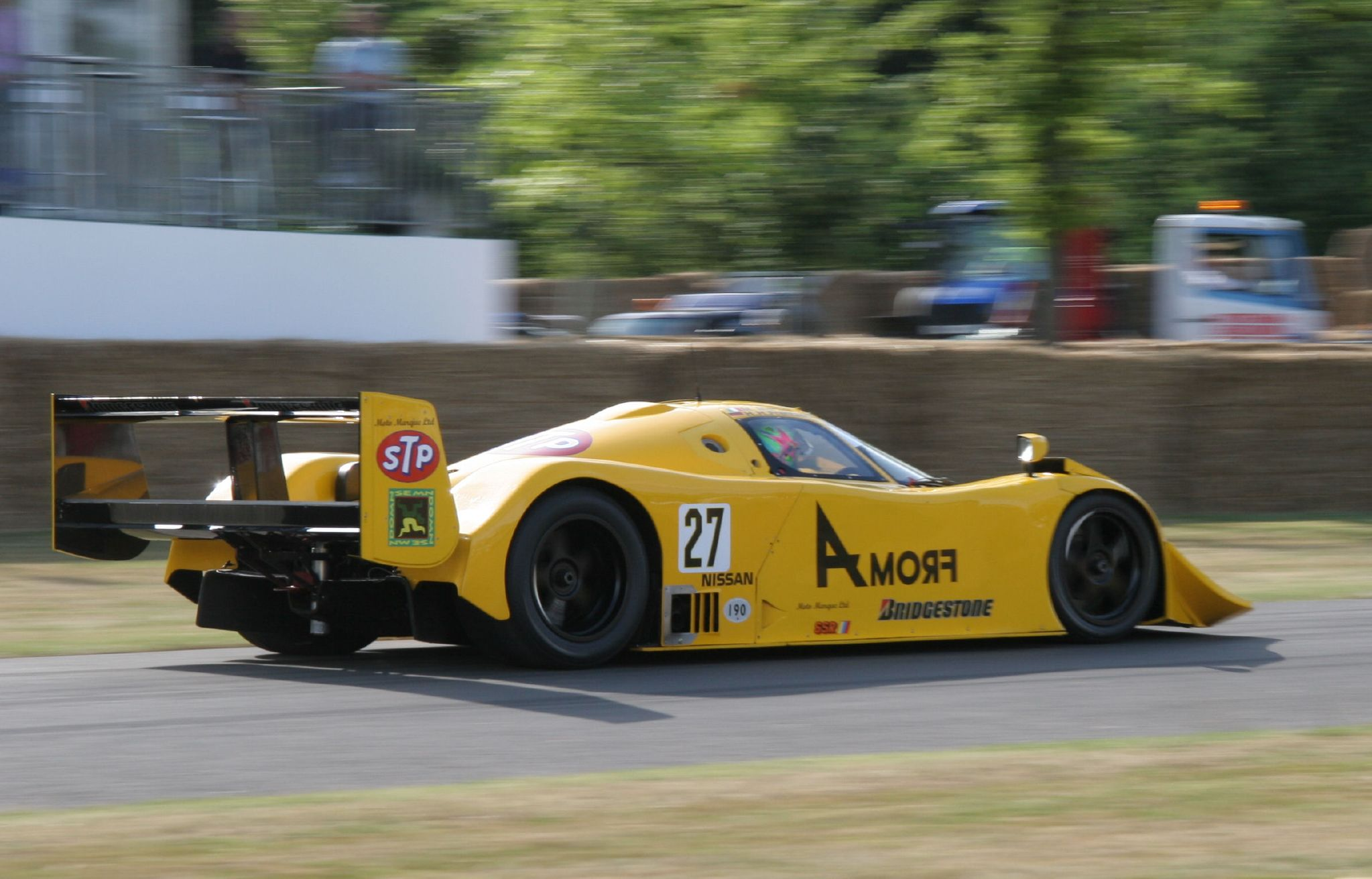
Two-tier rear wing, with lower profile mounted to enhance diffuser airflow.

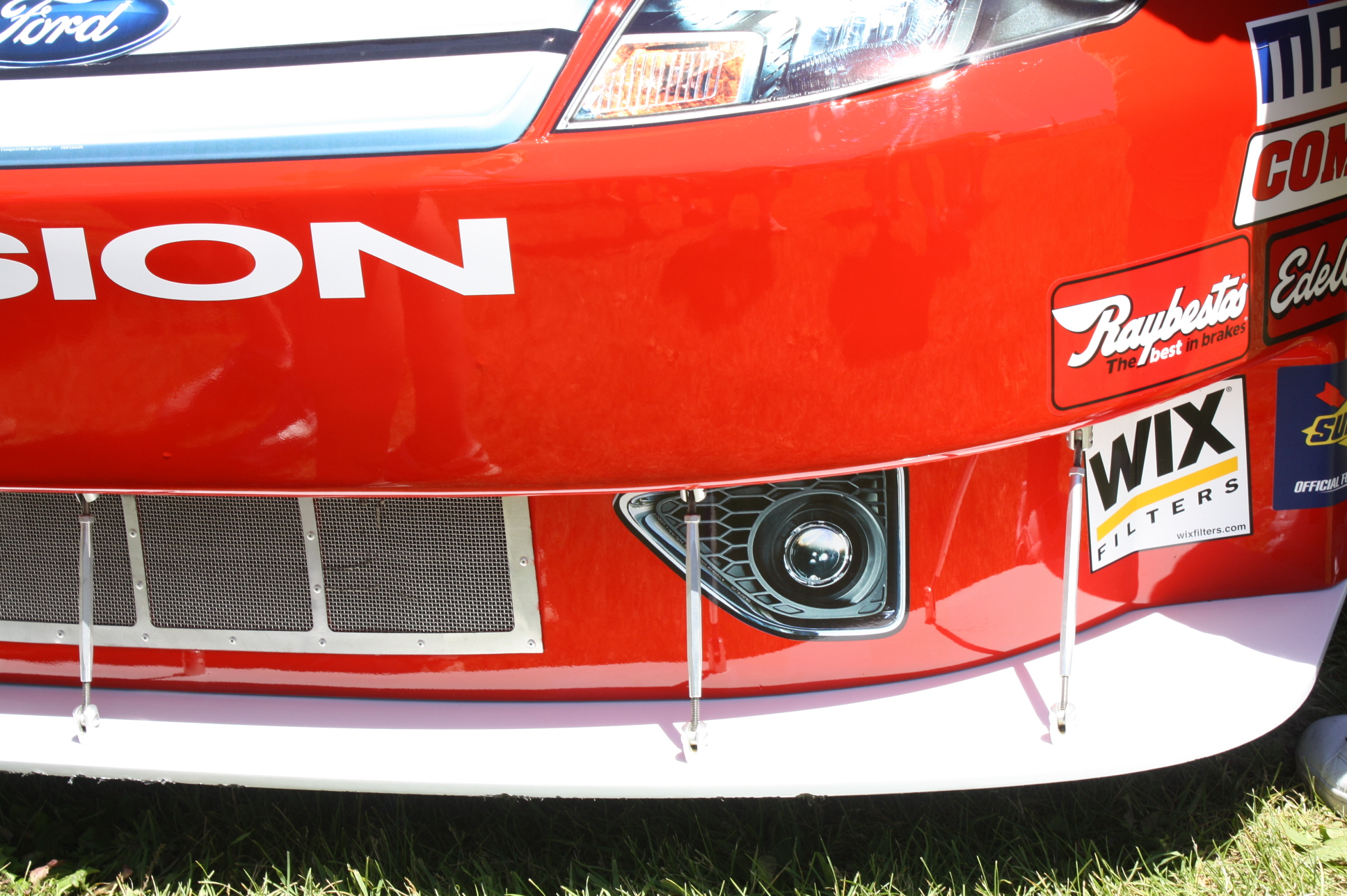
Front view of a splitter on a NASCAR car (white)

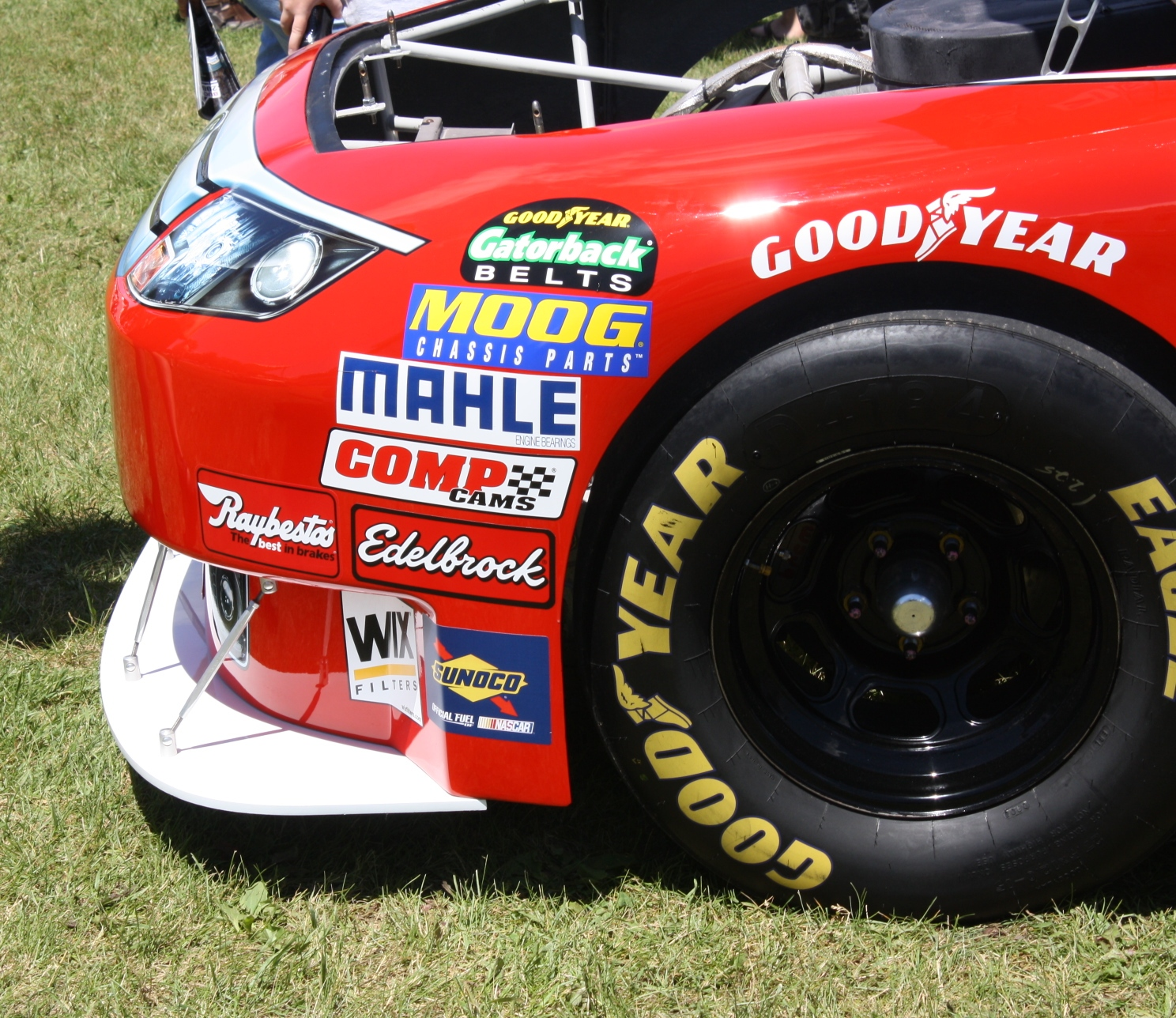
Side view of a splitter on a NASCAR car (white)

== See also ==
- Aerodynamics
- Ground effect in cars
- Racing car
- Venturi effect
