= Sabrewing Rhaegal =

Rhaegal
- Rhaegal-A Half-Scale Unmanned Air Cargo Aircraft Prototype

General information
- Type: Unmanned cargo aircraft
- National origin: United States
- Manufacturer: Sabrewing Aircraft

The Sabrewing Rhaegal is a proposed American unmanned cargo aircraft developed by Californian Sabrewing Aircraft.

== Design ==
The hybrid electric vertical takeoff and landing full-size Rhaegal-A is powered by a 600 hp (450 kW) turboshaft engine and has ducted fans, a 30 ft (9.1 m) wingspan, a 3,000 lb (1,400 kg) gross-weight, a VTOL payload of 800 or 1,000 lb (360 or 450 kg) in STOL mode, a maximum speed of 200 kn (370 km/h) and a range of 360 nmi (670 km) at up to 22,000 ft (6,700 m). A larger Wyvern could lift a VTOL payload of 4,400 or 5,000 lb (2,000 or 2,300 kg) in STOL configuration.

== Development ==
By February 2018, Sabrewing was to fly a 65%-scale vehicle in the fall. By February 2019, a one-eighth-scale model was going to be tested while the first full-size aircraft construction had begun, to fly by the end of 2019 and to enter service in 2023. By then, the Aleut Community of Saint Paul Island, Alaska, in the Bering Sea signed its first order for four Rhaegal and six larger Wyvern aircraft, to resupply Saint George Island, 47 mi (76 km) south. The half-scale Rhaegal-B was completed and officially revealed to the public during the U.S. Air Force "Agility Prime" program unveiling.

At the January 2020 Vertical Flight Society symposium, Sabrewing announced a larger Rhaegal-B was being completed, to be revealed within weeks. With an increase in wingspan, fuselage length and maximum gross weight, payload increases by 5,000 lb (2,300 kg) in VTOL and over 10,000 lb (4,500 kg) in conventional take-off/landing. It should load a single LD1 or LD3 container, or two LD2 containers, through the nose without special cargo handling equipment. FAR Part 23 certification negotiations were to be completed within weeks, to deliver cargo autonomously in any weather and any airspace.

In July 2020, Sabrewing announced that it had received the first Agility Prime contract from the United States Air Force worth $3.3 million USD for "evaluation" of Sabrewing's Rhaegal RG-1 aircraft. In September 2020, Sabrewing announced that it had received a firm order for 102 aircraft from Arabian Development and Marketing Company (ADMC), a company with IT, telecom, logistics and transportation and media interests, in a deal worth over $600 million. The deliveries of aircraft are to begin in 2022 to support the air cargo transportation needs of the Saudi Arabian Neom project.

In October of 2022, Sabrewing announced that its RH-1-A drone had lifted a payload of 829 pounds (374 kg) on its first hover flight, saying that this was a heavier payload than had previously been “dead-lifted” by any commercial, vertical takeoff, uncrewed air vehicle.

== See also ==
- Natilus

Aircraft of comparable role, configuration, and era

- Elroy Air Cargo
- Boeing Cargo Air Vehicle
