= Rhaegal =

Rhaegal may refer to:

- Rhaegal (Game of Thrones), one of the three dragons hatched by Daenerys Targaryen in the Game of Thrones franchise
- Sabrewing Rhaegal, a proposed American unmanned cargo aircraft developed by Californian Sabrewing Aircraft
- Pseudocalotes rhaegal, Rhaegal's false garden lizard, a species of agamid lizard, found in Malaysia
