= Boeing Cargo Air Vehicle =

American unmanned air cargo vehicle

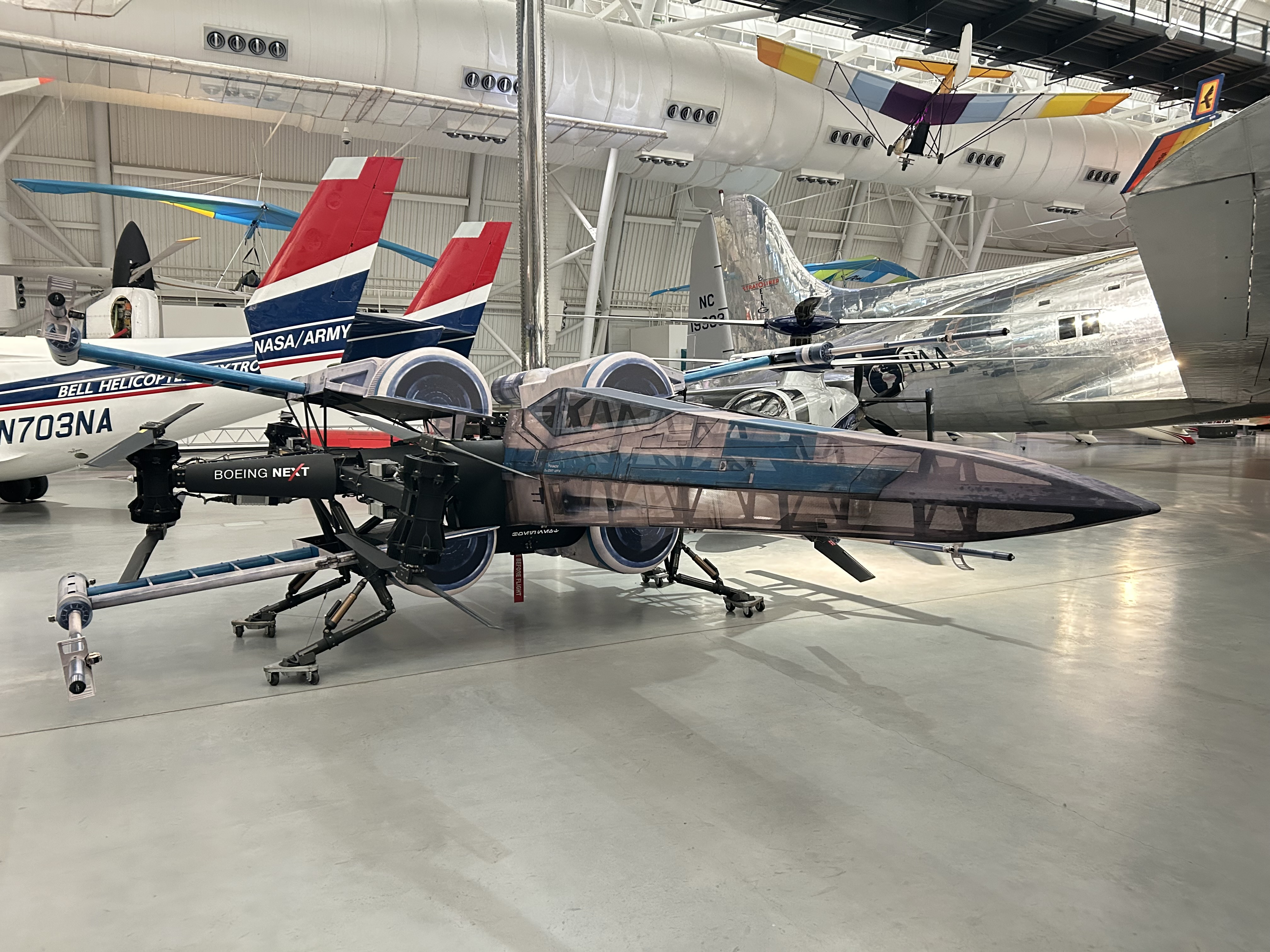
- Boeing CV2 Cargo Air Vehicle decorated to resemble an X-wing fighter from the Star Wars franchise.

General information
- Type: Cargo eVTOL
- National origin: United States
- Manufacturer: Boeing NeXt
- Status: Under development

The Boeing Cargo Air Vehicle is an unmanned, autonomously flying, fully electric cargo air vehicle (CAV). It was made possible by an investment of Boeing HorizonX Ventures.

== Development ==
At the beginning it was remote control-operated. Later it flew autonomously. The first flight tests have been in 2017. The CAV is for research of autonomy technology for aerospace vehicles in the future. In Boeing's Ridley Park wind tunnel flight tests have been finished. It was flying indoor in 2018 before outdoor flights in 2019. With the Boeing CAV there are new possibilities for the transport of time-sensitive and high-value goods and to conduct autonomous missions in remote or dangerous environments. Its configuration evolved to six dual-rotor systems with 12 propellers and the first outdoor flights tests were done by May 2019, including forward flight transition.

By September 2020, Boeing was to close its Boeing NeXt division, in response to financial losses in the wake of the 737 MAX groundings and the impact of the COVID-19 pandemic on aviation.

== Design ==
The CAV was designed and built by 50 engineers in less than three months.

== Specifications ==
Data from Boeing (also: cargo facts, Electric VTOL News, AINonline and transportup)

General characteristics

- Crew: None (“The Cube” autopilot by ProfiCNC)
- Capacity: up to 500 pounds (227 kg) payload
- Length: 17 ft 6 in (5.33 m)
- Wingspan: 20 ft 0 in (6.1 m)
- Height: 5 ft 0 in (1.52 m)
- Empty weight: 600 lb (272 kg)
- Max takeoff weight: 1,100 lb (499 kg)
- Powerplant: 6 × Vertical Electric dual propeller
- Maximum speed: 23 mph (37 km/h, 20 kn)
- Range: 50 mi (80 km, 43 nmi)
- Service ceiling: 390 ft (120 m)

== Similar types ==
- Microdrone

== Related developments ==
- Natilus

== See also ==
- List of electric aircraft
