= Boeing NeXt =

Division of Boeing

- Company type: Division of The Boeing Company
- Industry: Aviation
- Headquarters: Manassas, Virginia, United States
- Key people: Per Beith
- Products: E. g. Boeing PAV, CAV, Cora by Wisk
- Parent: Boeing

Boeing NeXt was a division of aerospace manufacturer Boeing, exploring urban air mobility. Its portfolio includes a passenger air vehicle (PAV), a cargo air vehicle (CAV) and other urban, regional and global mobility platforms.

By September 2020, Boeing was to close its Boeing NeXt division, in response to financial losses in the wake of the 737 MAX groundings and the impact of the COVID-19 pandemic on aviation.

== Projects ==
=== Passenger air vehicles ===
To test on-demand autonomous air transport, Boeing subsidiary Aurora Flight Sciences designed and developed in one year an electric VTOL Passenger Air Vehicle prototype. It made its first flight on January 22, 2019, in Manassas, Virginia, hovering before further tests and a transition to forward flight.

The Cora by Wisk is an autonomous personal air vehicle prototype developed by Wisk Aero LLC (Cooperation of the Kitty Hawk Corporation and Boeing).

Boeing and Volkswagen subsidiary Porsche, Porsche Engineering Services GmbH and F.A. Porsche decided October 2019 to work together to design a personal air vehicle prototype.

=== Cargo air vehicle ===
The unmanned, fully electric cargo air vehicle (CAV), transporting up to 500 lb (230 kg), was flying indoor in 2018 before outdoor flights in 2019.

=== Further projects ===
Beside the application development of electrically powered aircraft, NeXT develops concepts in the field of civil supersonic and hypersonic aircraft.

SkyGrid, a kind of aerial operating system using AI.

== See also ==
- List of electric aircraft
- Flying car (aircraft)
- Personal air vehicle
- Air taxi
