= Boeing Passenger Air Vehicle =

Autonomous personal air vehicle prototype

Passenger Air Vehicle
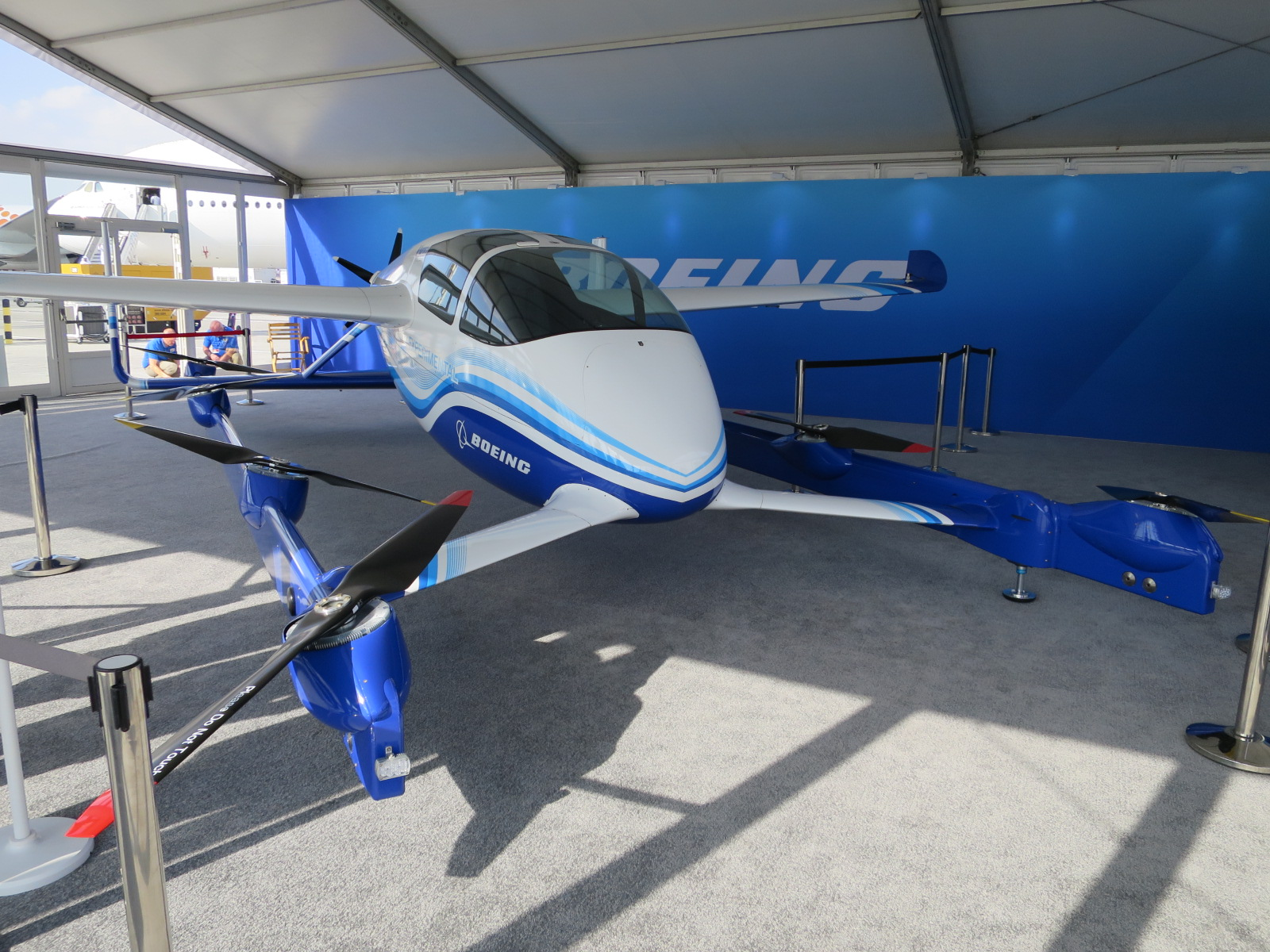
- Boeing Passenger Air Vehicle mockup at Dubai Air Show 2019

General information
- Type: Personal air vehicle
- National origin: United States
- Manufacturer: Boeing NeXt
- Status: Under development

History
- Introduction date: Planned for 2025
- First flight: 22 January 2019

The Boeing Passenger Air Vehicle (PAV) is an American electrical powered autonomous personal air vehicle prototype developed by the Boeing NeXt division of Boeing with the assistance of Aurora Flight Sciences.

== Development ==
Boeing subsidiary Aurora Flight Sciences designed an electric VTOL prototype, developing it to prototype by 2019. First, a model 1:10 was used to test the concept; it was flown with and without a fuselage. Further flight tests, with a 1:4 scale concept aircraft, were also conducted by Aurora.

The PAV first flew on January 22, 2019, in Manassas, Virginia, hovering before further tests and a transition to forward flight.

By September 2020, Boeing was to close its Boeing NeXt division, in response to financial losses in the wake of the 737 MAX groundings and the impact of the COVID-19 pandemic on aviation.

== Design ==
The three-surface aircraft has twin booms each supporting four lift rotors slightly angled alternatively outward and inwards, a pusher propeller and the rear wing has vertical surfaces at each end.

== Accident ==
On June 4, 2019, the PAV crashed during its 5th test flight. Boeing representatives declined to disclose details of the crash.

During the flight test engineers noted some brief data dropouts and abnormal motor speeds, and decided to terminate the flight. The pilot entered the autoland command, and after a small descent, the aircraft motors went to idle and the aircraft impacted the runway. The aircraft was substantially damaged. A review of the recorded data revealed that vibration occurred and briefly exceeded the jerk logic threshold used to detect contacts to the ground (in addition to squat switches). The aircraft entered the ground mode, subsequently commanding the motors to shutdown.

== Specifications (PAV) ==
Data from Electric VTOL News and THE VERGE, (January 2019)

General characteristics

- Crew: None (autopilot)
- Capacity: 2 passengers, 225 kg (496 lb) payload
- Length: 30 ft 0 in (9.14 m)
- Wingspan: 28 ft 0 in (8.53 m)
- Empty weight: 1,268 lb (575 kg)
- Max takeoff weight: 1,764 lb (800 kg)
- Powerplant: 1 × Pusher, horizontal axis Electric
- Powerplant: 8 × Lifting, almost vertical axis Electric each 100 hp (75 kW)
- Propellers: 5-bladed

Performance

- Cruise speed: 110 mph (180 km/h, 97 kn)
- Range: 50 mi (80 km, 43 nmi)

== See also ==
- Air taxi
- Flying car (aircraft)

Related development

- Airbus A³ Vahana
- Lilium Jet

Aircraft of comparable role, configuration, and era

- CityAirbus
- Opener BlackFly
- Terrafugia Transition

Related lists

- List of electric aircraft
