= Airbus CityAirbus =

Multinational project by Airbus Helicopters

CityAirbus
- Updated configuration in September 2021: main wing with six ductless rotors, twin boom tail with two control rotors

General information
- Type: Electric aircraft project
- National origin: Multinational
- Manufacturer: Airbus Helicopters
- Status: Under development

History
- First flight: May 3, 2019; 6 years ago

The Airbus CityAirbus is a multinational project by Airbus Helicopters to produce an electrically powered VTOL personal air vehicle demonstrator. It is intended for the air taxi role, to avoid ground traffic congestion.

== Development ==
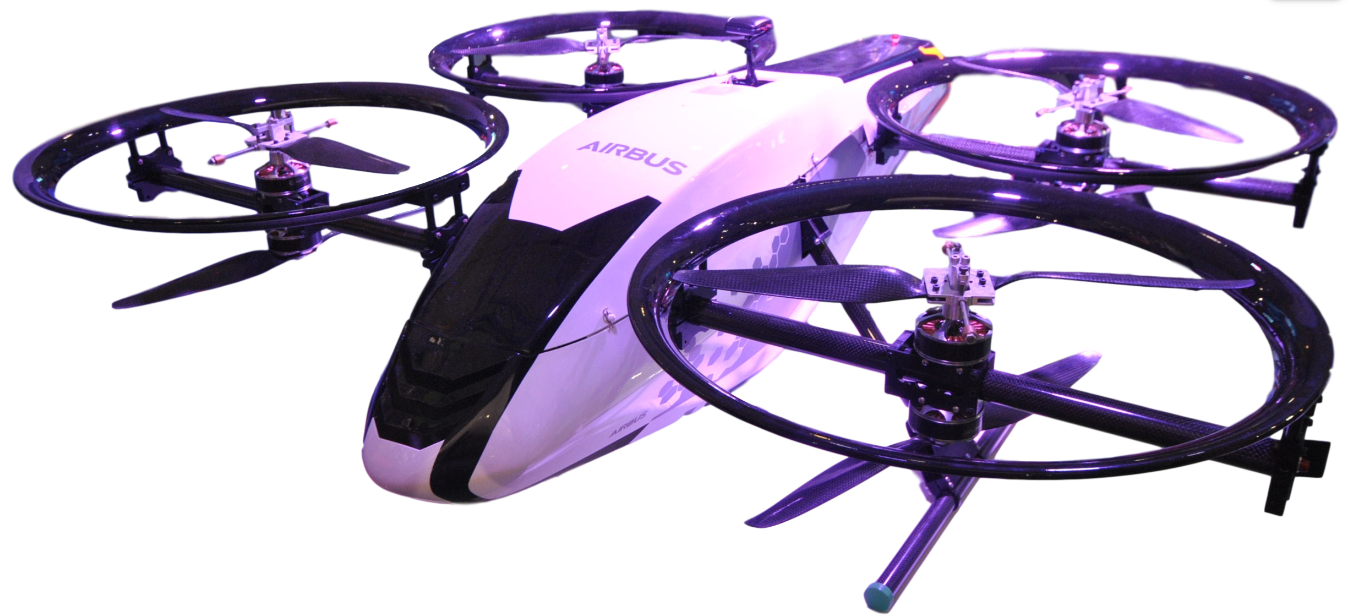
Model presented at the June 2017 Paris Air Show

December 2017 concept

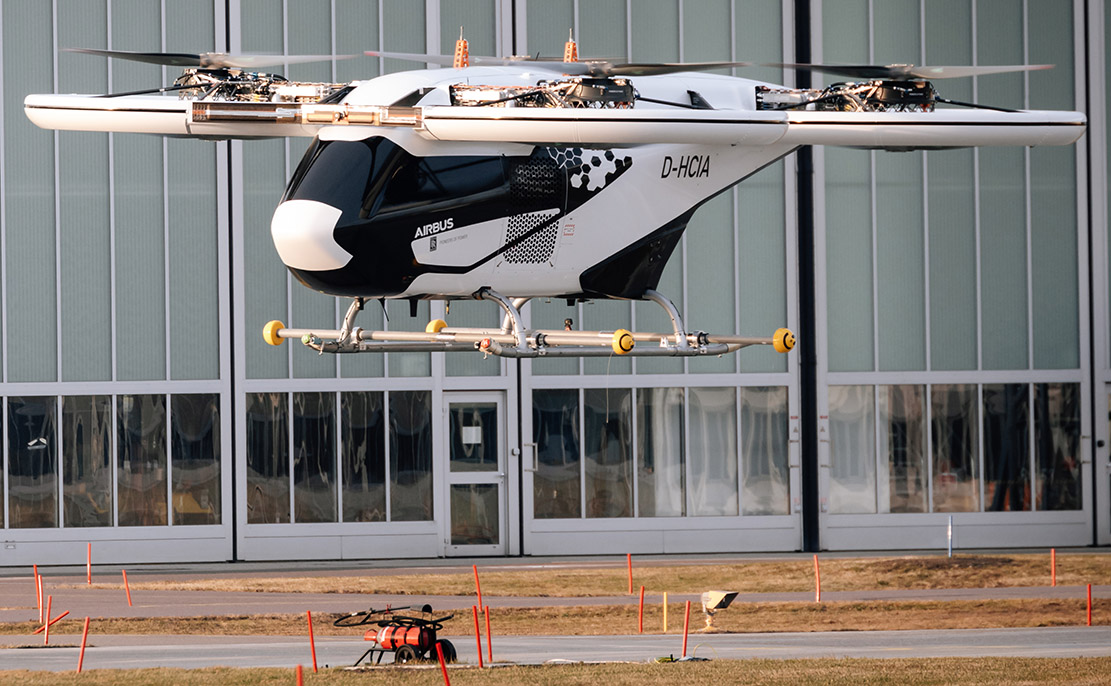
Test flight on January 20, 2020

The CityAirbus follows other Airbus Urban Air Mobility initiatives: Skyways to deliver packages by UAVs on the National University of Singapore campus, the A³ Vahana single-passenger, self-piloted VTOL aircraft and the A³ Voom on-demand shared helicopter booking service app by Airbus.

A 2015 feasibility study confirmed the design's operating costs and that it could meet safety requirements.Full-scale testing of the ducted propeller drivetrain was completed in October 2017.Type certification and commercial introduction are planned for 2023.

The iron bird systems test prototype was completed and powered on in December 2017 on a test bench in Taufkirchen, Germany, to test the propulsion system chain, flight controls and propeller dynamic loads, verifying the electric, mechanical and thermal dynamics before being installed on the flight demonstrator by mid-2018.

The first structural parts for the demonstrator were produced by Airbus Helicopters. The aircraft's first uncrewed flight was on 3 May 2019. Crewed flights have been planned for 2019. 31 August 2020 the CityAirbus demonstrator moved from Donauwörth to Manching near Ingolstadt in Bavaria.

After 242 flights over 1,000 km (540 nmi) in total with the Vahana and CityAirbus demonstrators, Airbus updated the CityAirbus project in September 2021. The new configuration boasts a fixed wing, a V-tail, and eight electric propellers without moving surfaces or tilting parts. It should carry up to four passengers over 80 km (43 nmi) at 120 km/h (65 kn) with sound levels below 65 dB(A) during fly-over and below 70 dB(A) during landing. First flight is planned for 2023 and certification is expected around 2025. As of mid-2025, one test flight has been advertised.

EASA is already working on a special condition VTOL (SC VTOL) means of compliance (MOC) to certify eVTOL aircraft. The final version of the MOC for eVTOLs will use newly developed Eurocae standards. The second flight control computer will be developed in collaboration with Diehl Aviation and Thales.

== Design ==
The multirotor is intended to carry four passengers, with a pilot initially and to become self-piloted when regulations allow.The overall system is being developed in Donauwörth, with the electrical propulsion system built in Ottobrunn/Munich.The use of four ducted fans contribute to safety and low acoustic footprint.The fully integrated drivetrain has eight propellers and eight 100 kW (130 hp) Siemens SP200D direct-drive electric motors.The fixed pitch propellers are controlled by their RPM.The four electric batteries total 110 kWh (400 MJ), weigh 500 kg and can produce a combined output four times 140 kW (190 hp). The design should cruise at 120 km/h (65 kn) on fixed routes with 15 minutes endurance.

== Specifications ==
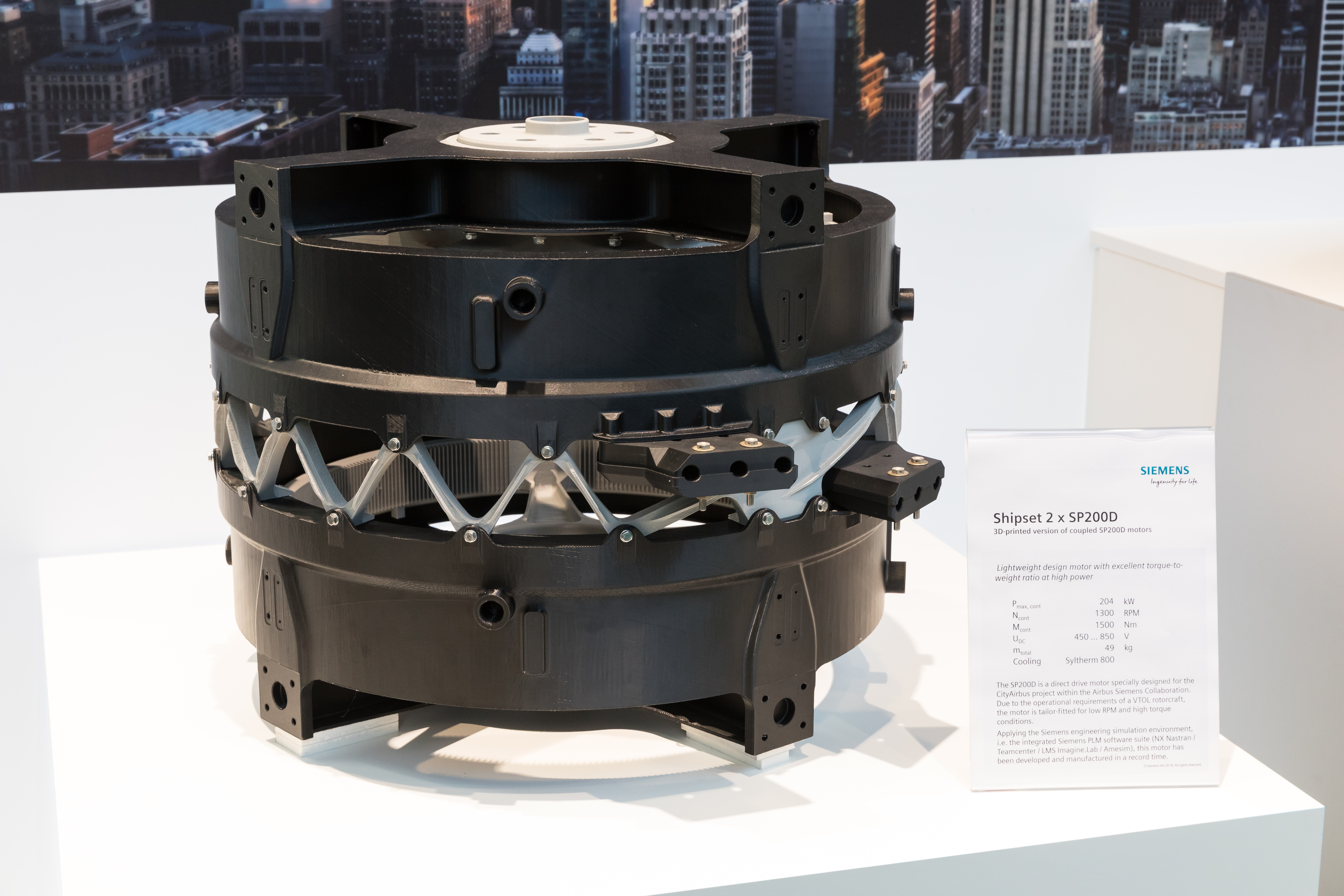
Siemens direct drive motor for the CityAirbus project

Data from Electric VTOL News

General characteristics

- Crew: 1 optional
- Capacity: 4 passengers 250 kg (550 lb) payload
- Length: 8 m (26 ft 3 in)
- Wingspan: 8 m (26 ft 3 in)
- Max takeoff weight: 2,200 kg (4,850 lb)
- Powerplant: 8 × vertical electric ducted fan, 100 kW (130 hp) each specially designed Siemens SP200D direct-drive, 4 × 140 kW (190 hp) battery output
- Propellers: 2.8 m (9 ft 2 in) diameter pitch rotor

Performance

- Cruise speed: 120 km/h (75 mph, 65 kn)
- Endurance: 15 minutes

== See also ==
- List of aircraft
- Air taxi
- Airbus A³ Vahana
- Boeing Passenger Air Vehicle
- Urban air mobility

=== Related development ===
- Volocopter
