= Cargo aircraft =

Aircraft configured specifically to transport cargo

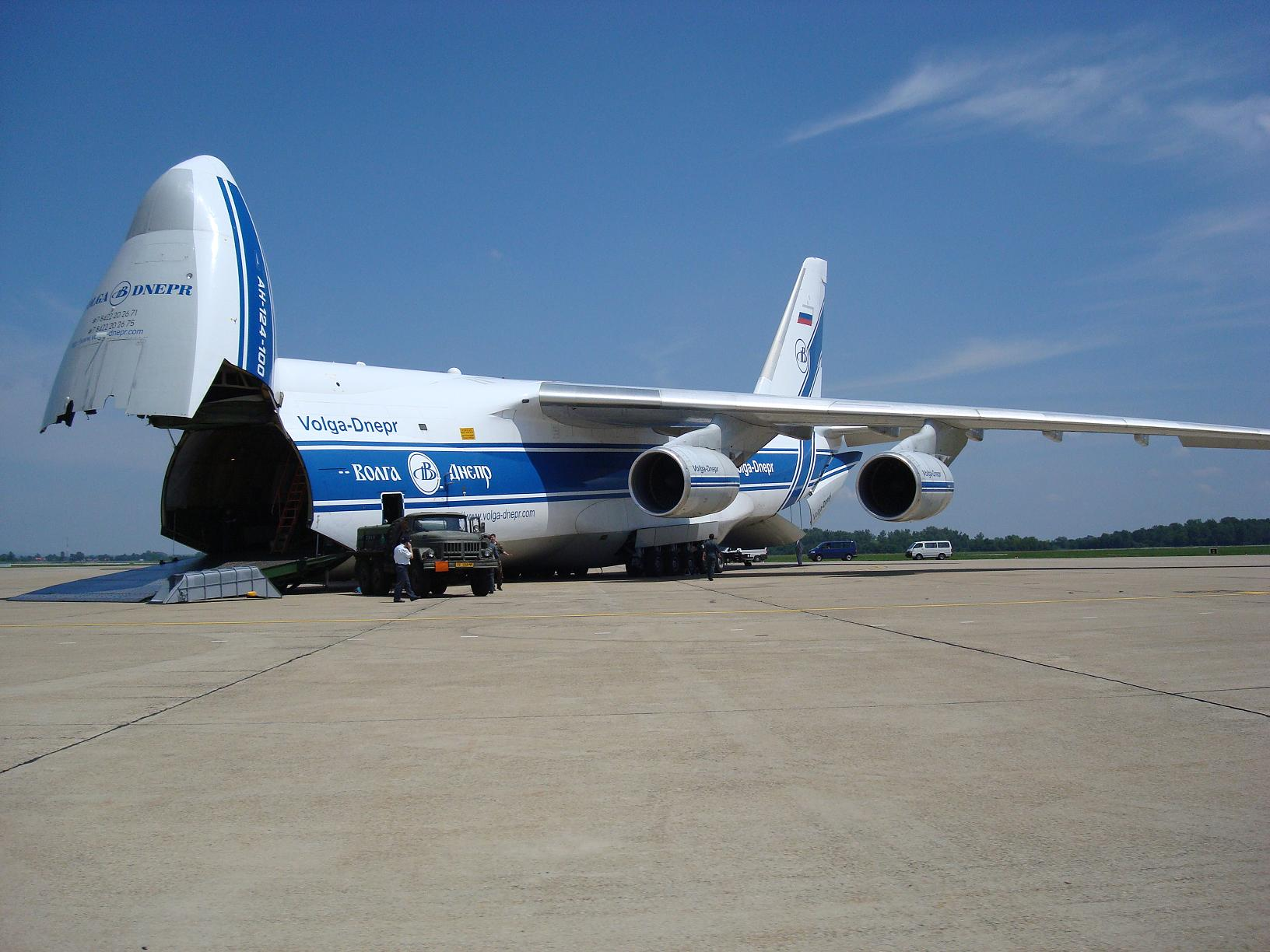
An Antonov An-124 Ruslan of Volga-Dnepr Airlines preparing for loading

A cargo aircraft (Note: Also known as a freight aircraft, transport aircraft, freighter, airlifter, or cargo plane.) is a fixed-wing aircraft that is designed or converted for the carriage of cargo rather than passengers. Such aircraft generally feature one or more large doors for loading cargo. Passenger amenities are removed or not installed, although there are usually basic comfort facilities for the crew such as a galley, lavatory, and bunks in larger planes. Freighters may be operated by civil passenger or cargo airlines, by private individuals, or by government agencies of individual countries such as the armed forces.

Aircraft designed for cargo flight usually have features that distinguish them from conventional passenger aircraft: a wide/tall fuselage cross-section, a high-wing to allow the cargo area to sit near the ground, numerous wheels to allow it to land at unprepared locations, and a high-mounted tail to allow cargo to be driven directly into and off the aircraft.

By 2015, dedicated freighters represent 43% of the 700 billion ATK (available tonne-kilometer) capacity, while 57% is carried in airliner's cargo holds. Also in 2015, Boeing forecast belly freight to rise to 63% while specialised cargoes would represent 37% of a 1,200 billion ATKs in 2035. The Cargo Facts Consulting firm forecasts that the global freighter fleet will rise from 1,782 to 2,920 cargo aircraft from 2019 to 2039.

== History ==
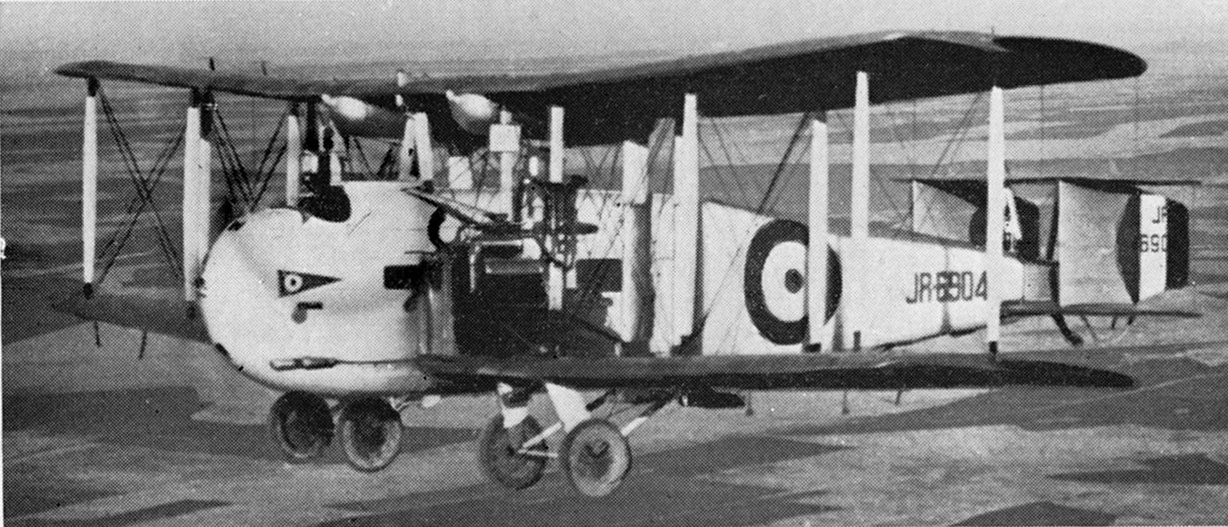
The Vickers Vernon, introduced in 1921, was the first cargo plane for military troops

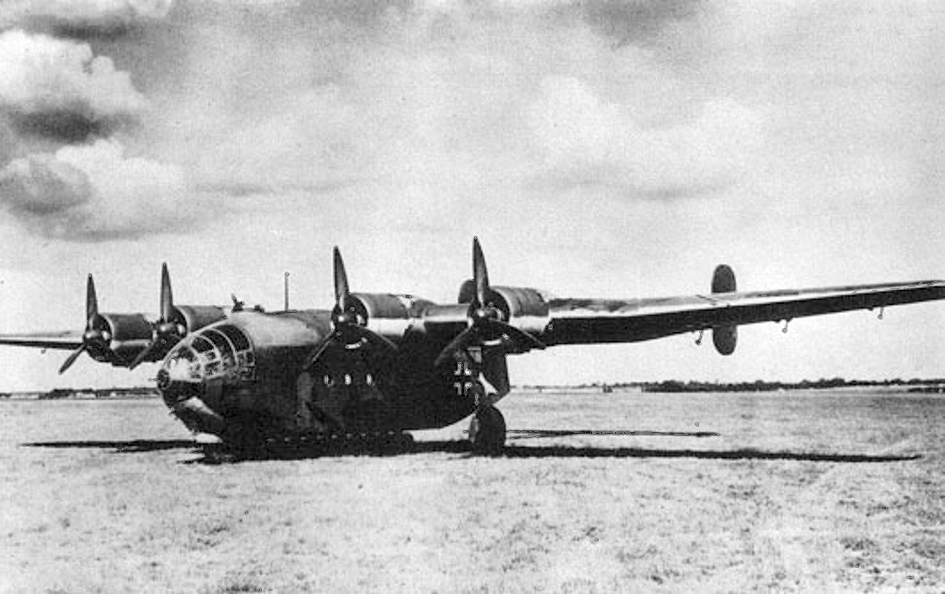
The Arado Ar 232, the first purpose built cargo aircraft

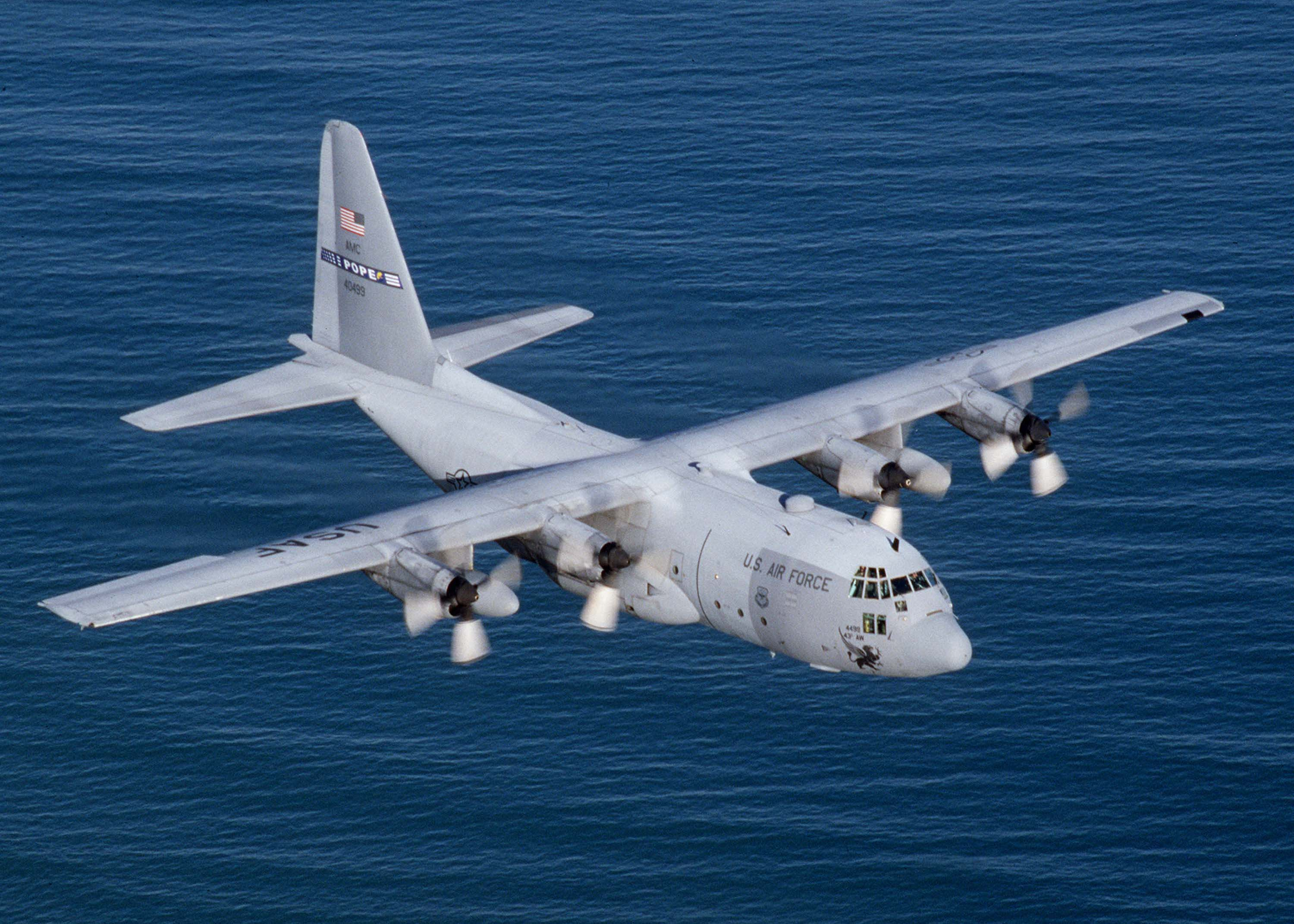
A U.S. Air Force Lockheed C-130 Hercules, the archetypal military transport aircraft, over the Atlantic Ocean in 2014

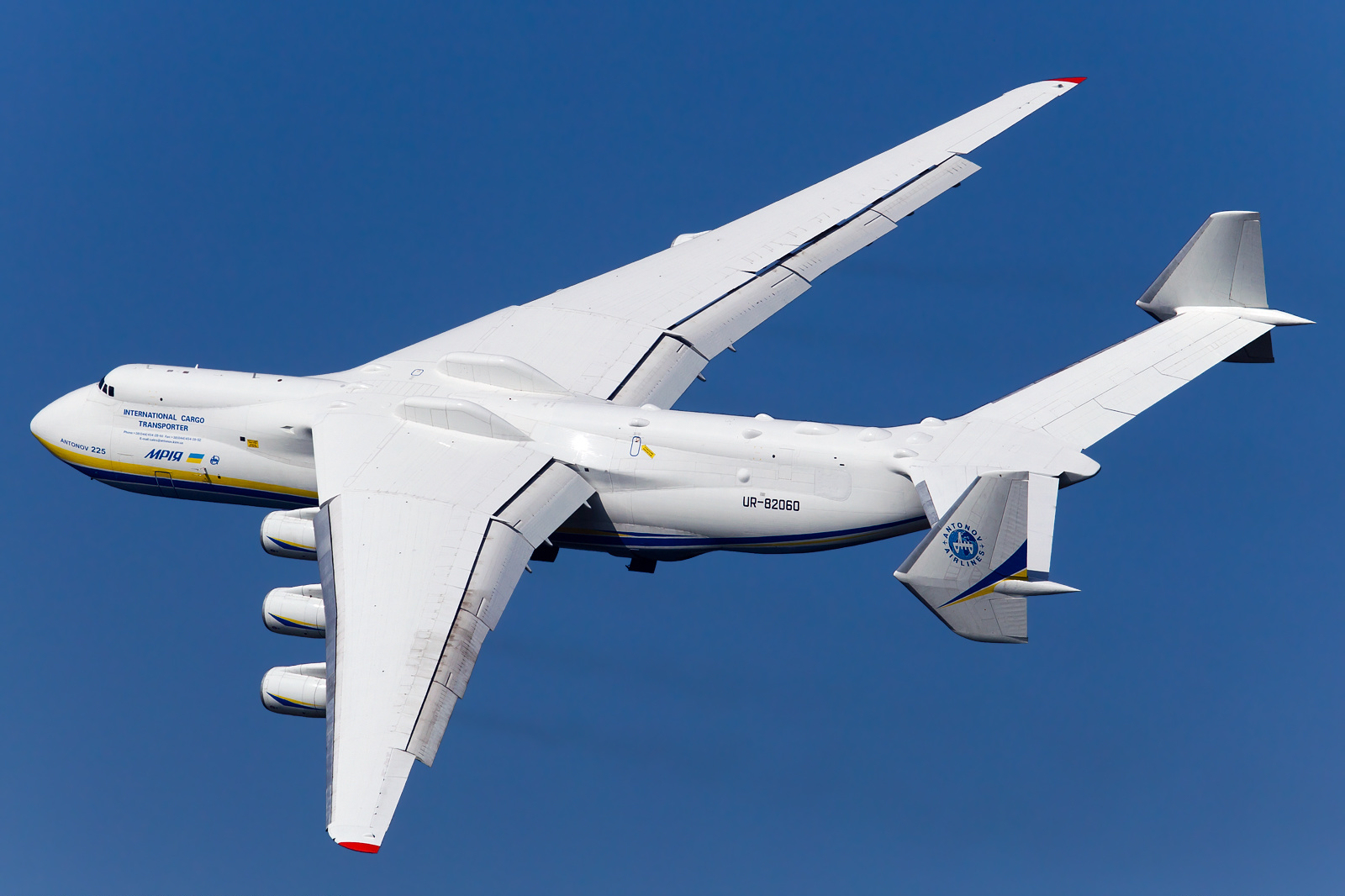
The Antonov An-225 Mriya, the heaviest cargo aircraft

Aircraft were put to use carrying cargo in the form of air mail as early as 1911. Although the earliest aircraft were not designed primarily as cargo carriers, by the mid-1920s aircraft manufacturers were designing and building dedicated cargo aircraft.

In the UK during the early 1920s, the need was recognized for a freighter aircraft to transport troops and material quickly to pacify tribal revolts in the newly occupied territories of the Middle East. The Vickers Vernon, a development of the Vickers Vimy Commercial, entered service with the Royal Air Force as the first dedicated troop transport in 1921. In February 1923 this was put to use by the RAF's Iraq Command who flew nearly 500 Sikh troops from Kingarban to Kirkuk in the first ever strategic airlift of troops. Vickers Victorias played an important part in the Kabul Airlift of November 1928 – February 1929, when they evacuated diplomatic staff and their dependents together with members of the Afghan royal family endangered by a civil war. The Victorias also helped to pioneer air routes for Imperial Airways' Handley Page HP.42 airliners.

The World War II German design, the Arado Ar 232 was the first purpose-built cargo aircraft. The Ar 232 was intended to supplant the earlier Junkers Ju 52 freighter conversions, but only a few were built. Most other forces used freighter versions of airliners in the cargo role as well, most notably the C-47 Skytrain version of the Douglas DC-3, which served with practically every Allied nation. One important innovation for future cargo aircraft design was introduced in 1939, with the fifth and sixth prototypes of the Junkers Ju 90 four-engined military transport aircraft, with the earliest known example of a rear loading ramp. This aircraft, like most of its era, used tail-dragger landing gear which caused the aircraft to have a decided rearward tilt when landed. These aircraft introduced the Trapoklappe, a powerful ramp/hydraulic lift with a personnel stairway centered between the vehicle trackway ramps, that raised the rear of the aircraft into the air and allowed easy loading. A similar rear loading ramp even appeared in a somewhat different form on the nosewheel gear-equipped, late WW II era American Budd RB-1 Conestoga twin-engined cargo aircraft.

Postwar Europe also served to play a major role in the development of the modern air cargo and air freight industry. It is during the Berlin Airlift at the height of the Cold War, when a massive mobilization of aircraft was undertaken by the West to supply West Berlin with food and supplies, in a virtual around the clock air bridge, after the Soviet Union closed and blockaded Berlin's land links to the west. To rapidly supply the needed numbers of aircraft, many older types, especially the Douglas C-47 Skytrain, were pressed into service. In operation it was found that it took as long or longer to unload these older designs as the much larger tricycle landing gear Douglas C-54 Skymaster which was easier to move about in when landed. The C-47s were quickly removed from service, and from then on flat-decks were a requirement of all new cargo designs.

In the years following the war era a number of new custom-built cargo aircraft were introduced, often including some "experimental" features. For instance, the US's C-82 Packet featured a removable cargo area, while the C-123 Provider introduced the now-common rear fuselage/upswept tail shaping to allow for a much larger rear loading ramp. But it was the introduction of the turboprop that allowed the class to mature, and even one of its earliest examples, the C-130 Hercules, in the 21st century as the Lockheed Martin C-130J, is still the yardstick against which newer military transport aircraft designs are measured. Although larger, smaller and faster designs have been proposed for many years, the C-130 continues to improve at a rate that keeps it in production.

"Strategic" cargo aircraft became an important class of their own starting with the Lockheed C-5 Galaxy in the 1960s and a number of similar Soviet designs from the 70s and 80s, and culminating in the Antonov An-225, the world's largest aircraft. These designs offer the ability to carry the heaviest loads, even main battle tanks, at global ranges. The Boeing 747 was originally designed to the same specification as the C-5, but later modified as a design that could be offered as either passenger or all-freight versions. The "bump" on the top of the fuselage allows the crew area to be clear of the cargo containers sliding out of the front in the event of an accident.

When the Airbus A380 was announced, the maker originally accepted orders for the freighter version A380F, offering the second largest payload capacity of any cargo aircraft, exceeded only by the An-225. An aerospace consultant has estimated that the A380F would have 7% better payload and better range than the 747-8F, but also higher trip costs. Starting May 2020 Portuguese Hi Fly started charting cargo flights with an A380, carrying medical supplies from China to different parts of the world in the response to the COVID-19 outbreak. It allows almost 320 m^{3} of cargo between the three decks. In November 2020 Emirates started offering an A380 mini-freighter, which allows for 50 tons of cargo in the belly of the plane.

== Importance ==
Cargo aircraft has had many uses throughout the years, but the current importance of cargo aircraft is not highly talked about. Cargo planes today can carry almost everything ranging from perishables and supplies to fully built cars and livestock. The most use of cargo aircraft comes from the increase in online shopping through retailers like Amazon and eBay. Since most of these items are made all over the world, air cargo is used to get it from point A to point B as fast as possible. Air cargo significantly adds to the world trade value, Air cargo transports over US$6 trillion worth of goods, accounting for approximately 35% of world trade by value. This helps producers keep the costs of goods down, allows consumers to be able to purchase more items, and allows stores to remain with goods on the shelf.

Not only is air cargo important in the delivery and shipping aspect, it is also highly important in the job industry. Air cargo companies around the United States employ over 250,000 workers, U.S. cargo airlines employed 268,730 workers in August 2023, 34% of the industry total.

== Cargo aircraft types ==
Nearly all commercial cargo aircraft presently in the fleet are derivatives or transformations of passenger aircraft. However, there are three other methods to the development of cargo aircraft.

=== Derivatives of non-cargo aircraft ===
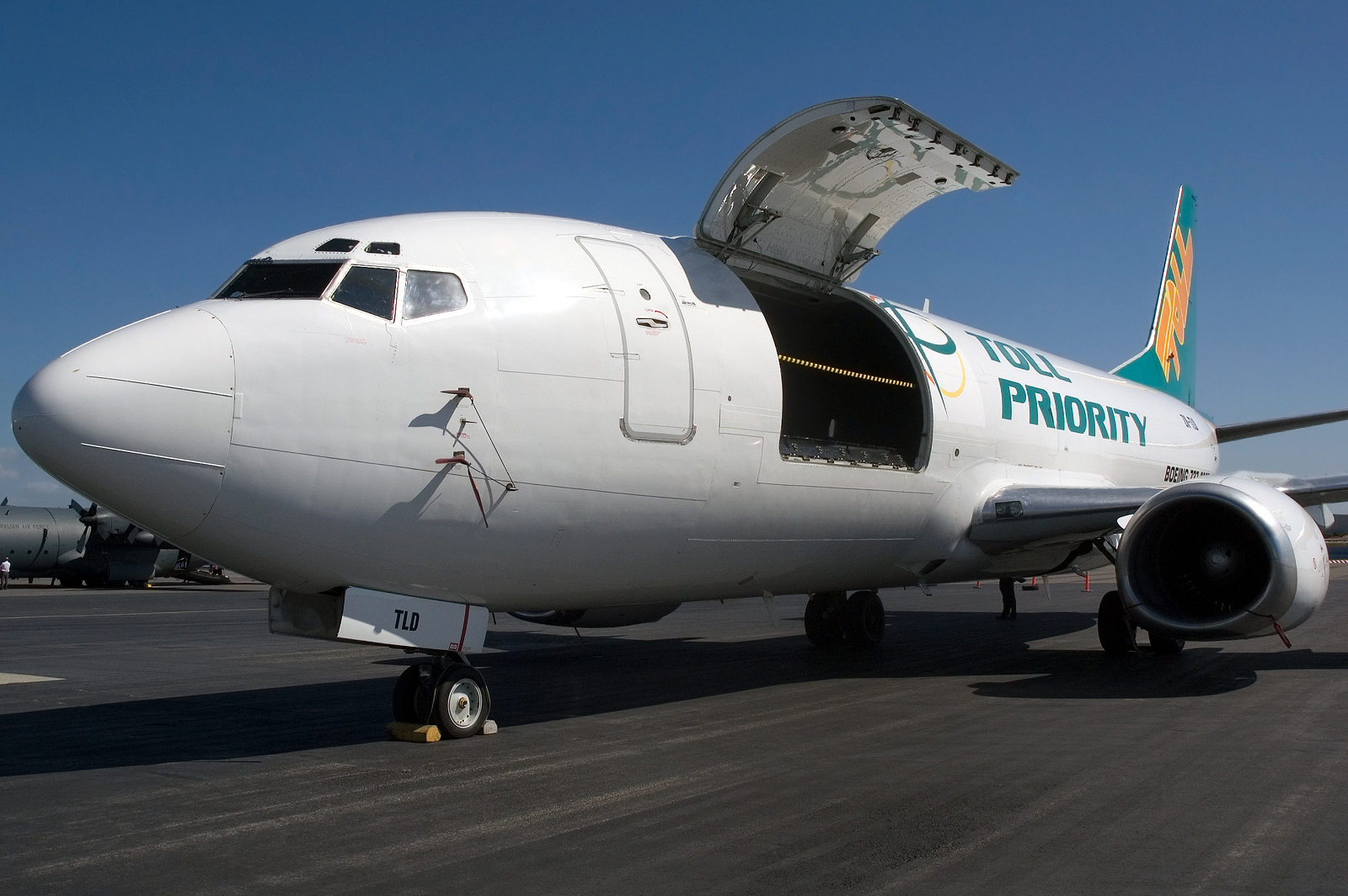
A Boeing 737-300 converted freighter of Toll Aviation in 2009

Many types can be converted from airliner to freighter by installing a main deck cargo door with its control systems; upgrading floor beams for cargo loads and replacing passenger equipment and furnishings with new linings, ceilings, lighting, floors, drains and smoke detectors. Specialized engineering teams rival Airbus and Boeing, giving the aircraft another 15–20 years of life. Aeronautical Engineers Inc converts the Boeing 737-300/400/800, McDonnell Douglas MD-80 and Bombardier CRJ200. Israel Aerospace Industries’ Bedek Aviation converts the 737-300/400/700/800 in about 90 days, 767-200/300s in about four months and 747-400s in five months, and is looking at the Boeing 777, Airbus A330 and A321. Voyageur Aviation located in North Bay, Ontario converts the DHC-8-100 into the DHC-8-100 Package Freighter Conversion.

An A300B4-200F conversion cost $5M in 1996, an A300-600F $8M in 2001, a McDonnell Douglas MD-11F $9M in 1994, a B767-300ERF $13M in 2007, a Boeing 747-400 PSF $22M in 2006, an A330-300 P2F was estimated at $20M in 2016 and a Boeing 777-200ER BCF at $40M in 2017. By avoiding the main deck door installation and relying on lighter elevators between decks, LCF Conversions wants to convert A330/A340s or B777s for $6.5M to $7.5M. In the mid-2000s, passenger 747-400s cost $30–50 million before a $25 million conversion, a Boeing 757 had to cost $15 million before conversion, falling to below $10 million by 2018, and $5 million for a 737 Classic, falling to $2–3 million for a Boeing 737-400 by 2018.

Derivative freighters have most of their development costs already amortized, and lead time before production is shorter than all new aircraft. Converted cargo aircraft use older technology; their direct operating costs are higher than what might be achieved with current technology. Since they have not been designed specifically for air cargo, loading and unloading is not optimized; the aircraft may be pressurized more than necessary, and there may be unnecessary apparatus for passenger safety.

=== Dedicated civilian cargo aircraft ===
A dedicated commercial air freighter is an airplane which has been designed from the beginning as a freighter, with no restrictions caused by either passenger or military requirements. Over the years, there has been a dispute concerning the cost effectiveness of such an airplane, with some cargo carriers stating that they could consistently earn a profit if they had such an aircraft. To help resolve this disagreement, the National Aeronautics and Space Administration (NASA) selected two contractors, Douglas Aircraft Co. and Lockheed-Georgia Co., to independently evaluate the possibility of producing such a freighter by 1990. This was done as part of the Cargo/Logistics Airlift Systems Study (CLASS). At comparable payloads, dedicated cargo aircraft was said to provide a 20 percent reduction in trip cost and a 15 percent decrease in aircraft price compared to other cargo aircraft. These findings, however, are extremely sensitive to assumptions about fuel and labor costs and, most particularly, to growth in demand for air cargo services. Further, it ignores the competitive situation brought about by the lower capital costs of future derivative air cargo aircraft.

The main advantage of the dedicated air freighter is that it can be designed specifically for air freight demand, providing the type of loading and unloading, flooring, fuselage configuration, and pressurization which are optimized for its mission. Moreover, it can make full use of NASA's ACEE results, with the potential of significantly lowering operating costs and fuel usage. Such a high overhead raises the price of the airplane and its direct operating cost (because of depreciation and insurance costs) and increases the financial risks to investors, especially since it would be competing with derivatives which have much smaller development costs per unit and which themselves have incorporated some of the cost-reducing technology.

=== Joint civil-military cargo aircraft ===
One benefit of a combined development is that the development costs would be shared by the civil and military sectors, and the number of airplanes required by the military could be decreased by the number of civil reserve airplanes purchased by air carriers and available to the military in case of emergency. There are some possible drawbacks, as the restrictions executed by joint development, the punishments that would be suffered by both civil and military airplanes, and the difficulty in discovering an organizational structure that authorizes their compromise. Some features appropriate to a military aircraft would have to be rejected, because they are not suitable for a civil freighter. Moreover, each airplane would have to carry some weight which it would not carry if it were independently designed. This additional weight lessens the payload and the profitability of the commercial version. This could either be compensated by a transfer payment at acquisition, or an operating penalty compensation payment. Most important, it is not clear that there will be an adequate market for the civil version or that it will be cost competitive with derivatives of passenger aircraft.

=== Unpiloted cargo aircraft ===
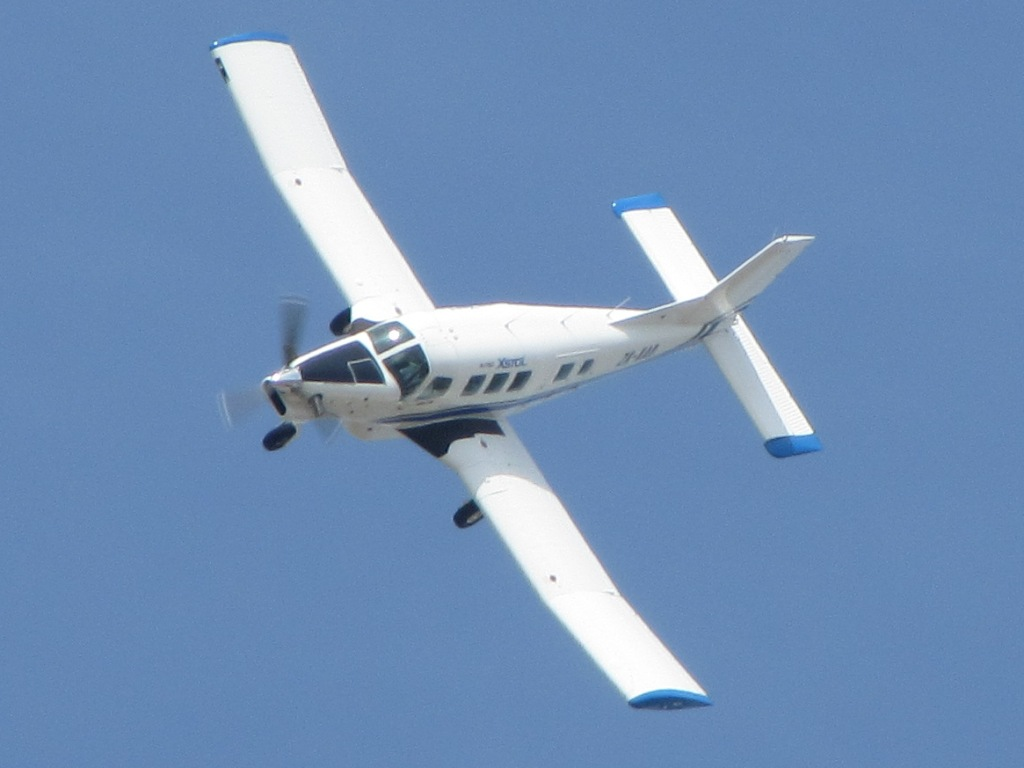
The Chinese Academy of Sciences flying an unpiloted PAC P-750 XSTOL in 2012

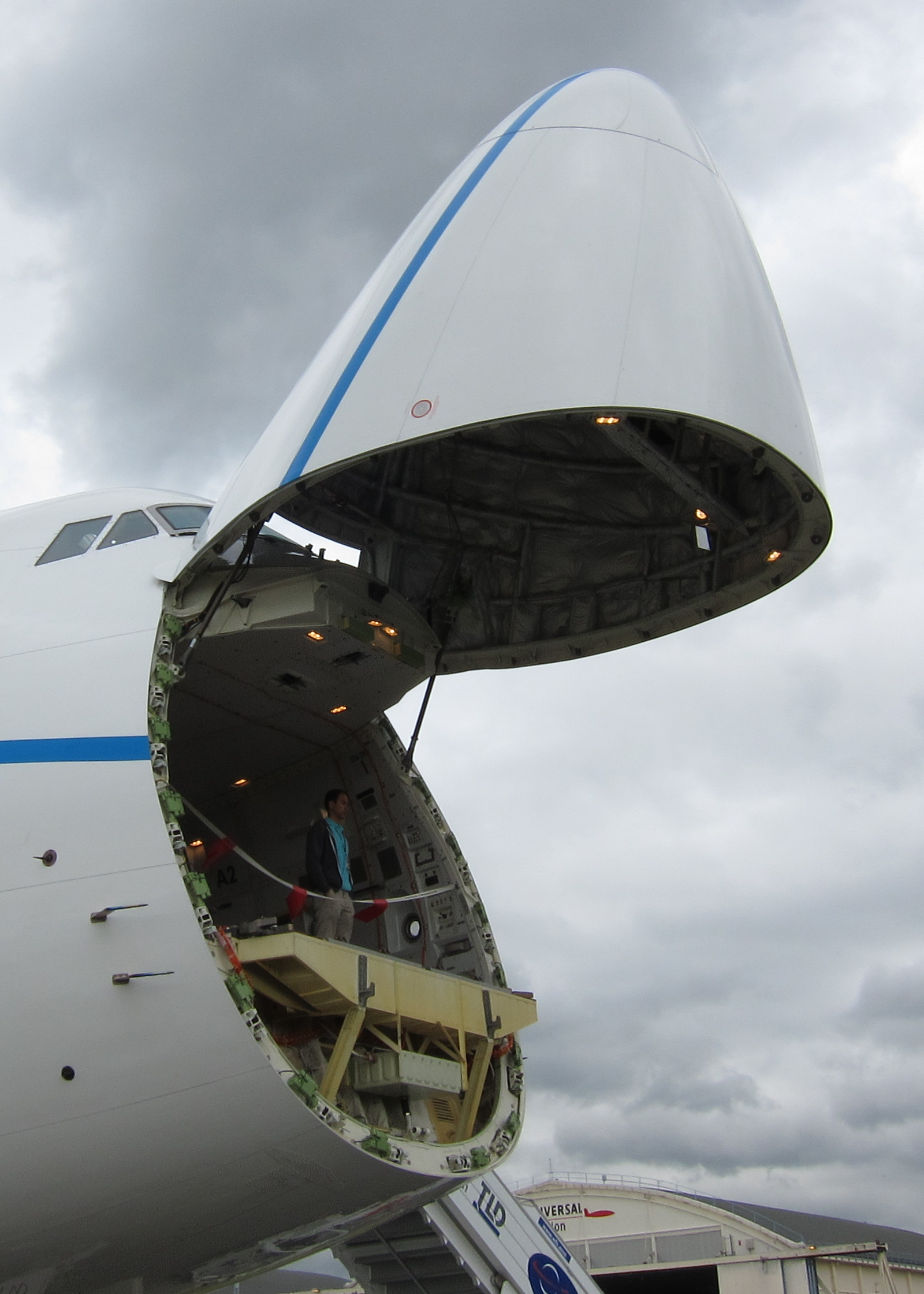
A Boeing 747's open cargo door nose at the Paris Air Show in 2011

Rapid delivery demand and e-commerce growth stimulate UAV freighters development for 2020:

- Californian Elroy Air wants to replace trucks on inefficient routes and should fly a subscale prototype;
- Californian Natilus plans a Boeing 747 sized transpacific unpiloted freighter and should fly a subscale prototype;
- Californian Sabrewing Aircraft targets small regional unpiloted freighter and should fly a 65%-scale vehicle in 2018 fall;
- The Chinese Academy of Sciences flew its 1.5-tonne (3,300 lb) payload AT200 in October 2017 based on New Zealand's PAC P-750 XSTOL utility turboprop
- Chinese package carrier SF Express conducted emergency logistics tests in December 2017 with a Tengoen Technologies’ TB001 medium-altitude UAV, and plan an eight-turbofan carrying 20 t (44,000 lb) more than 7,600 km (4,100 nmi)
- Boeing flew its Boeing Cargo Air Vehicle prototype, a vertical takeoff and landing (eVTOL) craft.

Carpinteria, California-startup Dorsal Aircraft wants to make light standard ISO containers part of its unpiloted freighter structure where the wing, engines and tail are attached to a dorsal spine fuselage. Interconnecting 1.5–15.2-metre-long (5–50 ft) long aluminum containers carry the flight loads, aiming to lower overseas airfreight costs by 60%, and plan to convert C-130H with the help of Wagner Aeronautical of San Diego, experienced in passenger-to-cargo conversions.

Beijing-based Beihang UAS Technology developed its BZK-005 high-altitude, long-range UAV for cargo transport, capable of carrying 1.2 t (2,600 lb) over 1,200 km (650 nmi) at 5,000 m (16,000 ft). Garuda Indonesia will test three of them initially from September 2019, before operations in the fourth quarter. Garuda plans up to 100 cargo UAVs to connect remote regions with limited airports in Maluku, Papua, and Sulawesi.

== Examples ==
=== Early air mail and airlift logistics aircraft ===
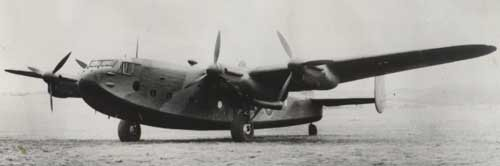
This Avro York cargo plane, photographed by the Royal Air Force, was later used by Winston Churchill

- Avro Lancastrian (Transatlantic mail)
- Avro York (Berlin Airlift)
- Boeing C-7000
- Curtiss JN-4
- Douglas M-2
- Douglas DC-3
- Douglas DC-4
- Douglas DC-6

=== Converted airliners ===
- Airbus A300
- Airbus A310
- Airbus A320 family (Note: Conversions)
- Airbus A330
- Airbus A350
- ATR 72
- HESA Simourgh (An-140)
- Boeing 727
- Boeing 737
- Boeing 747
- Boeing 757
- Boeing 767
- Boeing 777
- Bombardier Dash 8-100/-300
- Bristol Britannia
- British Aerospace 146QT
- British Aerospace ATPF
- Bombardier CRJ-200
- Douglas DC-3
- Douglas DC-8
- Douglas DC-9
- Handley Page Herald
- Ilyushin Il-96
- McDonnell Douglas DC-10
- McDonnell Douglas MD-11
- Tupolev Tu-204

=== Oversize transport ===
- Aero Spacelines Mini Guppy
- Aero Spacelines Pregnant Guppy
- Aero Spacelines Super Guppy
- Airbus Beluga A300B4-608ST
- Airbus BelugaXL A330-743L
- Boeing 747 LCF Dreamlifter

=== Light aircraft ===
- Antonov An-2
- Basler BT-67
- Beechcraft 1900
- CASA C-212 Aviocar
- Cessna Caravan – freight door and belly pod equipped
- Cessna 408 SkyCourier – developed jointly with FedEx Express
- de Havilland Canada DHC-2 Beaver
- de Havilland Canada DHC-6 Twin Otter
- Dornier 228
- Douglas C-47 Skytrain
- Embraer EMB 110 Bandeirante
- Fairchild Swearingen Metroliner
- Harbin Y-12
- Indonesian Aerospace N-219
- LET 410
- Shorts 330 – drop ramp and twin tailed vertical stabilizer
- Short Skyvan

=== Military cargo aircraft ===
- Airbus A330 MRTT
- Airbus A400M Atlas
- Alenia C-27J Spartan
- Antonov An-12
- Antonov An-22
- Antonov An-26
- Antonov An-32
- Antonov An-124 Ruslan
- Antonov An-225 Mriya
- Antonov An-178
- Blackburn Beverley
- Boeing C-17 Globemaster III
- Embraer KC-390
- Handley Page Hastings
- Ilyushin Il-76
- Kawasaki C-2
- Lockheed C-5 Galaxy
- Lockheed C-130 Hercules (civilian version: L-100)
- Lockheed C-141 Starlifter
- Shaanxi Y-9
- Short Belfast
- Xian Y-20

=== Experimental cargo aircraft ===
- Hughes H-4 Hercules ("Spruce Goose")
- Lockheed R6V Constitution
- LTV XC-142

=== Comparisons ===
Comparison of cargo aircraft capabilities
Aircraft	Volume (m^{3})	Payload	Cruise	Range	Usage
Airbus A400M	270	37,000 kg (82,000 lb)	780 km/h (420 kn)	6,390 km (3,450 nmi)	Military
Airbus A300-600F	391.4	48,000 kg (106,000 lb)	–	7,400 km (4,000 nmi)	Commercial
Airbus A330-200F	475	70,000 kg (154,000 lb)	871 km/h (470 kn)	7,400 km (4,000 nmi)	Commercial
Airbus A380	342	68,000 kg (150,000 lb)	871 km/h (470 kn)	14,800 km (8,000 nmi)	Commercial
Airbus Beluga	1210	47,000 kg (104,000 lb)	–	4,632 km (2,500 nmi)	Commercial
Airbus BelugaXL	2615	53,000 kg (117,000 lb)	737 km/h (398 kn)	4,074 km (2,200 nmi)	Commercial
Antonov An-124	1028	150,000 kg (331,000 lb)	800 km/h (430 kn)	5,400 km (2,900 nmi)	Both
Antonov An-22	639	80,000 kg (176,000 lb)	740 km/h (400 kn)	10,950 km (5,910 nmi)	Both
Antonov An-225	1300	250,000 kg (551,000 lb)	800 km/h (430 kn)	15,400 km (8,316 nmi)	Commercial
Boeing C-17	592	77,519 kg (170,900 lb)	830 km/h (450 kn)	4,482 km (2,420 nmi)	Military
Boeing 737-700C	107.6	18,200 kg (40,000 lb)	931 km/h (503 kn)	5,330 km (2,880 nmi)	Commercial
Boeing 757-200F	239	39,780 kg (87,700 lb)	955 km/h (516 kn)	5,834 km (3,150 nmi)	Commercial
Boeing 747-8F	854.5	134,200 kg (295,900 lb)	908 km/h (490 kn)	8,288 km (4,475 nmi)	Commercial
Boeing 747 LCF	1840	83,325 kg (183,700 lb)	878 km/h (474 kn)	7,800 km (4,200 nmi)	Commercial
Boeing 767-300F	438.2	52,700 kg (116,200 lb)	850 km/h (460 kn)	6,025 km (3,225 nmi)	Commercial
Boeing 777F	653	103,000 kg (227,000 lb)	896 km/h (484 kn)	9,070 km (4,900 nmi)	Commercial
Bombardier Dash 8-100	39	4,700 kg (10,400 lb)	491 km/h (265 kn)	2,039 km (1,100 nmi)	Commercial
HESA Simourgh	49	6,000 kg (13,200 lb)	533 km/h (288 kn)	3900 km (2105 nmi)	Commercial \ Military
Lockheed C-5	880	122,470 kg (270,000 lb)	830 km/h (450 kn)	4,440 km (2,400 nmi)	Military
Lockheed Martin C-130J	170	18,700 kg (41,200 lb)	644 km/h (348 kn)	3,300 km (1,800 nmi)	Military
Douglas DC-10-30		77,000 kg (170,000 lb)	908 km/h (490 kn)	5,790 km (3,127 nmi)	Commercial
McDonnell Douglas MD-11	440	91,670 kg (202,100 lb)	945 km/h (510 kn)	7,320 km (3,950 nmi)	Commercial
Airbus A350F	695	111,000 kg (245,000 lb)	903 km/h (488 kn)	8,700 km (4,700 nmi)	Commercial
Airbus Casa C295-W	57	9,250 kg (20,390 lb)	482 km/h (260 kn)	1,277 km (690 nmi)	Military

== See also ==
- Airlift
- Air transport
- Cargo airline
- Combi aircraft
- Modular aircraft
- Preighter
