= Natilus =

American company developing blended-wing passenger and air cargo aircraft

- Type: Private
- Industry: Aerospace industry
- Founded: 2016
- Founders: Aleksey Matyushev; Anatoly Starikov
- Headquarters: San Diego, California
- Key people: Aleksey Matyushev (CEO)
- Products: Passenger and cargo aircraft design
- Subsidiaries: Natilus India
- Website: www.natilus.co

Natilus is a San Diego–based aerospace company developing next-generation blended-wing-body cargo aircraft.

== History ==
Natilus was founded in April 2016 by Aleksey Matyushev and Anatoly Starikov. The idea for Natilus was sparked after their industrial design firm experienced challenges getting product out of Asia, leading them to the realization that cargo shipping is inexpensive but slow, while air freight is timely but expensive. The company was originally based in the San Francisco Bay Area and the original prototype was a seaplane. In 2021 the company relocated to San Diego, California, to access aerospace engineering talent and a world-class wind tunnel facility.

== Market ==
Natilus targets an existing $197 billion global air cargo market, projected to grow beyond $210 billion by 2027, and the potential to tap into the $2.2 trillion global cargo shipping market, projected to reach $4.2 trillion by 2031. Natilus is also targeting an existing $83.99 billion passenger aircraft market.

== Aircraft ==
The design of Natilus's blended-wing-body aircraft includes vertical tails and conventionally configured (tricycle) landing gear.

Natilus's regional cargo aircraft, KONA, can carry a payload of 3.8 metric tons with a range of 900 nautical miles. Made of carbon fibre and fibreglass composites, KONA can be optionally piloted and is powered by turboprop engines developed by Pratt & Whitney.

Natilus's first passenger aircraft, the HORIZON, can carry a payload of 25 tons with a range of 3,500 nautical miles. The aircraft can carry up to 200 passengers.

== Development ==
Natilus raised $750,000 of venture capital from Tim Draper and was incubated at the aviation-oriented Starburst Accelerator in Los Angeles.

In November 2017, Natilus closed a second round of seed funding from Starburst Ventures, Seraph Group, Gelt VC, Outpost Capital and Draper Associates.

Natilus has announced two aircraft in production: KONA, a pusher twin-turboprop regional cargo freighter capable of carrying 3.8 tonnes (8,400 lb) payload over 900 nautical miles (1,700 km), and HORIZON, a passenger aircraft capable of carrying 25 tonnes (55,000 lb) over 3,500 nautical miles (6,500 km). In April 2023, Natilus completed multiple flights of the subscale prototype of its KONA regional aircraft. In an unusual move for a commercial aerospace company, Natilus has partnered with the YouTuber "Ramy RC" to build a scaled-down prototype of the Horizon aircraft. The prototype will have a 24-foot (7.3 metre) wingspan, and is expected to complete its first flights in early 2026.

The company reported that Ameriflight has "agreed to purchase" 20 KONAs, and that total agreements cover 460 aircraft valued at over $6.8 billion. In February 2025, Natilus reported that Canadian charter airline Nolinor Aviation agreed to purchase multiple KONA aircraft. In December 2025, Natilus announced an agreement with India's SpiceJet to certify the HORIZON in India, and subsequently sell 100 of these aircraft to the nation. As per Reuters, they are also planning to manufacture 300 such jets within India.

== See also ==
- Air cargo
- Cargo airline
- blended wing body
