= Elroy Air Chaparral =

Type of unmanned aircraft

Chaparral
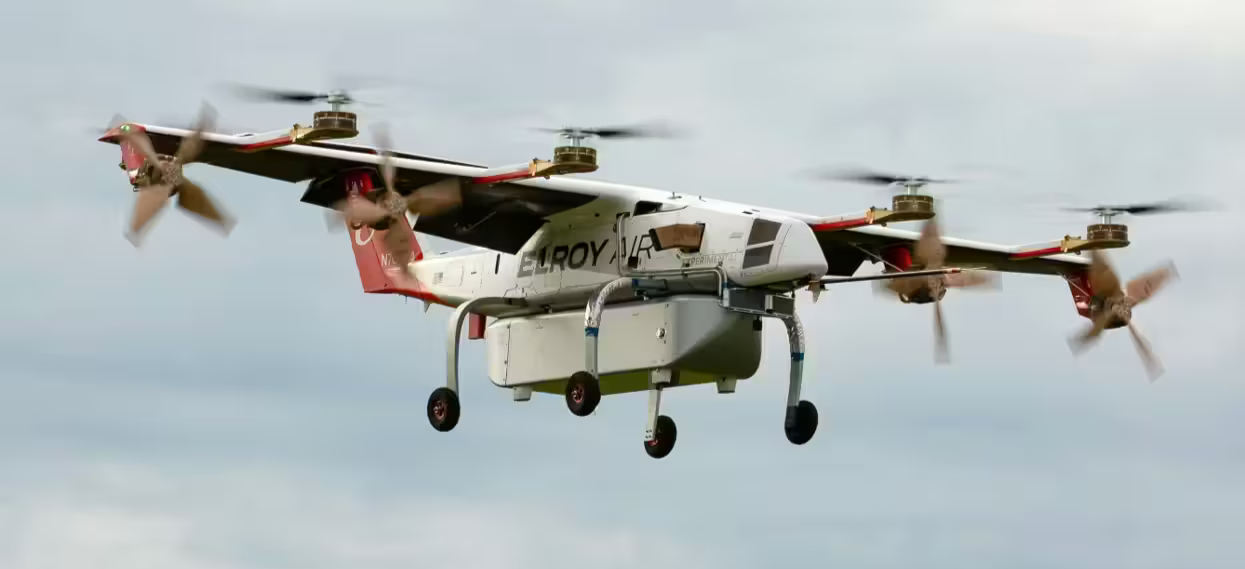
- Chaparral drone

General information
- Type: Unmanned cargo delivery system
- National origin: United States
- Manufacturer: Elroy Air

History
- First flight: 12 November 2023

The Elroy Air Chaparral, developed by American startup company Elroy Air, is an unmanned vertical takeoff and landing (VTOL) drone designed to carry 500+ pounds of cargo.

== History ==
The San Francisco-based company was founded in November 2016 by David Merrill, CEO and Clint Cope, VP engineering. Elroy Air initially pursued the electric aircraft VTOL air taxi market, but turned to autonomous cargo aircraft to avoid the complications of passenger-carrying certification. In December 2017, the company secured US$4.6 million of seed funding, led by aerial mobility investor Levitate Capital.

By early 2018, a full-scale prototype had been tested at Half Moon Bay Airport, south of San Francisco. Its lift system—rotors, motors and controllers—was rigged on a truck-based testbed to verify the aerodynamic lift produced and the aircraft noise levels for urban operations. In early 2018 a subscale prototype was under construction to validate the aerodynamics and controls, with ground testing planned in early March 2018 and first flight by late March. The full-scale aircraft was forecast to be flown by late summer 2018.

In early 2019, Elroy Air raised another $4.6 million, giving it a total of $9.2 million. On August 14, the Chaparral made its first flight at Camp Roberts, California, completing a 64 second hover. The hybrid-electric propulsion system for beyond-line-of-sight testing should fly in the second half of 2020 on a second prototype. A further Series A funding round was required for serial production.

In January 2022, unveiled the pre-production Chaparral C1. Its cargo capacity reached 500 lb (230 kg), while its range was claimed to be 300 mi (480 km).

In June 2026, Chaparral's parent company, Elroy Air, announced plans to go public through a SPAC transaction.

== Design ==
The tandem-wing design employed in the air cargo role has a pusher propeller for forward flight, six propellers under twin booms for vertical lift and a pod to carry 150 lb (68 kg) of cargo under the central fuselage. The hybrid electric powertrain has variable-pitch rotors with a large diameter to turn more slowly, for redundancy and to reduce noise. Its 150 mile (240 km) operational radius is optimized for express delivery. Ground robots are planned to be employed for ground handling and one pilot would be responsible for an entire aircraft fleet.

== Specifications ==
Data from Aviation Week

General characteristics

- Crew: None (autonomous)
- Capacity: 500 lb (230 kg)
- Max takeoff weight: 1,215 lb (551 kg)
- Powerplant: 6 × electric rotors
- Powerplant: 1 × pusher propeller
- Range: 300 mi (480 km, 260 nmi)
