= General Atomics MQ-9 Reaper =

American unmanned aerial vehicle

MQ-9 Reaper / Predator B
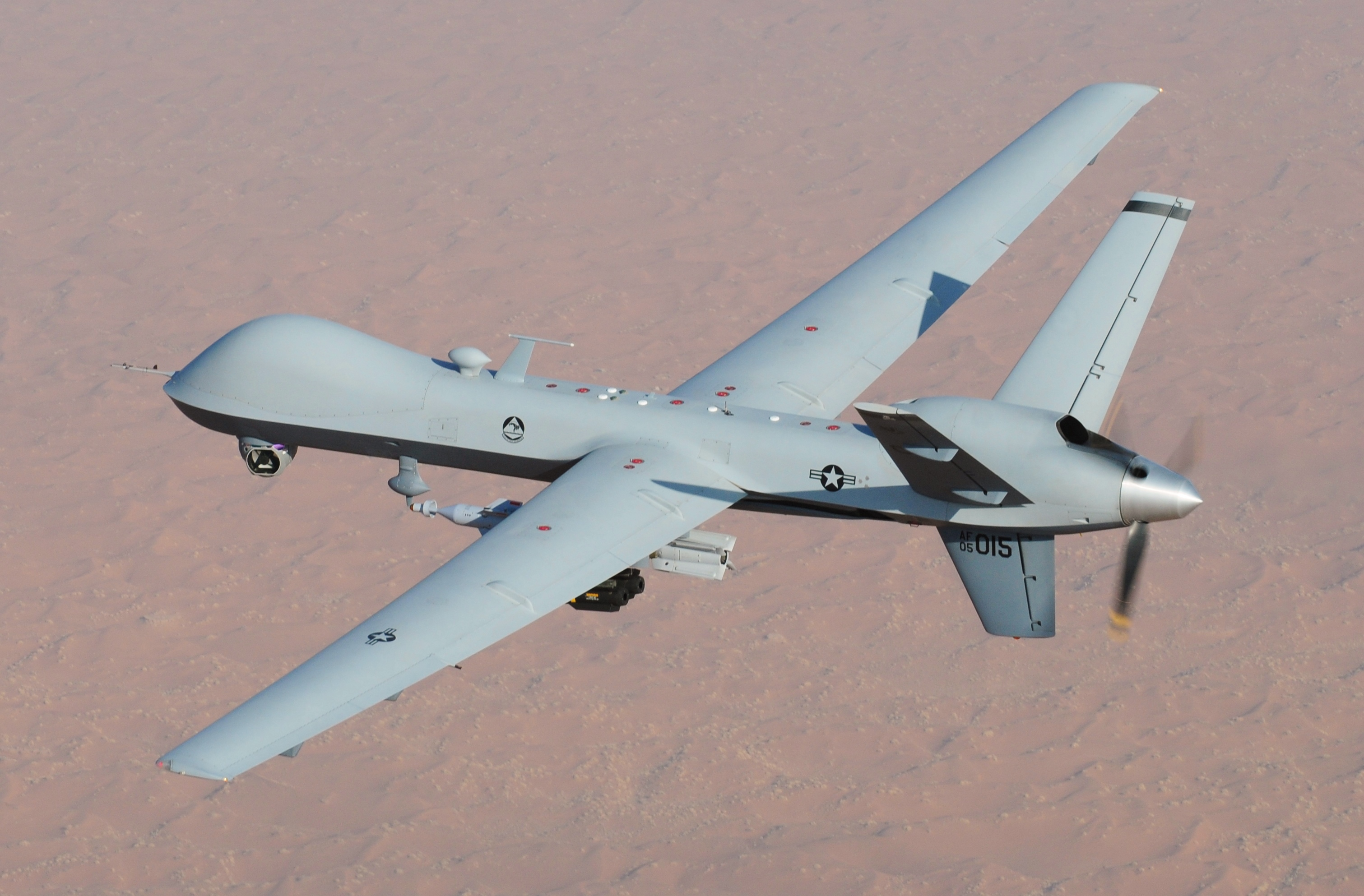
- U.S. Air Force MQ-9A Reaper armed with a Paveway and 2 AGM-114 Hellfire missiles

General information
- Type: Unmanned combat aerial vehicle
- National origin: United States
- Manufacturer: General Atomics Aeronautical Systems
- Status: In service
- Primary users: United States Air Force: U.S. Customs and Border Protection; Italian Air Force; Royal Air Force
- Number built: 575 as of 2026

History
- Introduction date: 1 May 2007
- First flight: 2 February 2001; 25 years ago
- Developed from: General Atomics MQ-1 Predator
- Developed into: General Atomics MQ-20 Avenger; General Atomics Mojave

The General Atomics MQ-9 Reaper (sometimes called Predator B) is a medium-altitude long-endurance unmanned aerial vehicle (UAV), one component of an Unmanned Aircraft System (UAS) capable of either remotely controlled or autonomous flight operations, developed by General Atomics Aeronautical Systems (GA-ASI) primarily for the United States Air Force (USAF). The MQ-9 and other UAVs are referred to as Remotely Piloted Vehicles (RPVs) or Remotely Piloted Aircraft (RPAs) by the USAF to signify ground control by humans.

The MQ-9 is a larger, heavier, more capable aircraft than the earlier General Atomics MQ-1 Predator and can be controlled by the same ground systems. The Reaper has a 950-shaft-horsepower (712 kW) turboprop engine (compared to the Predator's 115 hp (86 kW) piston engine). The greater power allows the Reaper to carry 15 times more ordnance payload and cruise at about three times the speed of the MQ-1.

The aircraft is monitored and controlled, including weapons employment, by aircrew in the Ground Control Station (GCS). The MQ-9 is the first hunter-killer UAV designed for long-endurance surveillance. In 2006, Chief of Staff of the United States Air Force General T. Michael Moseley said: "We've moved from using UAVs primarily in intelligence, surveillance, and reconnaissance roles before Operation Iraqi Freedom, to a true hunter-killer role with the Reaper."

The USAF operated over 300 MQ-9 Reapers as of May 2021. Several MQ-9 aircraft have been retrofitted with equipment upgrades to improve performance in "high-end combat situations", and all new MQ-9s will have those upgrades. 2035 is the projected end of the service life of the MQ-9 fleet. The average unit cost of an MQ-9 is estimated at $34 million in 2025 dollars. The Reaper is also used by the U.S. Customs and Border Protection and the militaries of several other countries. The MQ-9 has been further developed into the MQ-9B, which are referred to by General Atomics as SkyGuardian or SeaGuardian depending on mission and payload.

== Development ==
=== Origins ===
The General Atomics "Predator B-001", a proof-of-concept aircraft, first flew on 2 February 2001. Abraham Karem is the designer of the Predator. The B-001 was powered by an AlliedSignal Garrett TPE331-10T turboprop engine with 950 shaft horsepower (710 kW). It had an airframe that was based on the standard Predator airframe, except with an enlarged fuselage and wings lengthened from 48 feet (15 m) to 66 feet (20 m). The B-001 had a speed of 220 knots (410 km/h; 250 mph) and could carry a payload of 750 pounds (340 kg) to an altitude of 50,000 feet (15,000 m) with an endurance of 30 hours.

The company refined the design, taking it in two separate directions. The first was a jet-powered version; "Predator B-002" was fitted with a Williams FJ44-2A turbofan engine with 2,300 pounds-force (10.2 kN) thrust. It had payload capacity of 475 pounds (215 kg), a ceiling of 60,000 feet (18 km) and endurance of 12 hours. The USAF ordered two aircraft for evaluation, delivered in 2007. The two prototype airframes B-001 and B-002 have been retired to the USAF museum at Wright-Patterson AFB. B-002 was originally equipped with the FJ-44 engine but it was removed and a TPE-331-10T was installed so that the USAF could take delivery of two aircraft in the same configuration.

The second direction the design took was referred to by GA as the "Altair". Also called the "Predator B-003", it had a new airframe with an 84-foot (26 m) wingspan and a takeoff weight of approximately 7,000 pounds (3,200 kg). Like the B-001, it was powered by a TPE-331-10YGD turboprop. This variant has a payload capacity of 3,000 pounds (1,400 kg), a maximum ceiling of 52,000 feet (16 km), and an endurance of 36 hours.

In October 2001, the USAF signed a contract for an initial pair of Predator Bs (001 and 002) for evaluation. Designated YMQ-9s due to their prototype role, they were delivered in 2002. The USAF referred to it as "Predator B" until it was renamed "Reaper". The USAF aimed for the Predator B to provide an improved "deadly persistence" capability, flying over a combat area night-and-day waiting for a target to present itself, or complementing piloted attack aircraft, which were typically used to drop larger quantities of ordnance on a target. Conversely, a cheaper RPV could operate almost continuously using ground controllers working in shifts, but carrying less ordnance.

=== Operation ===
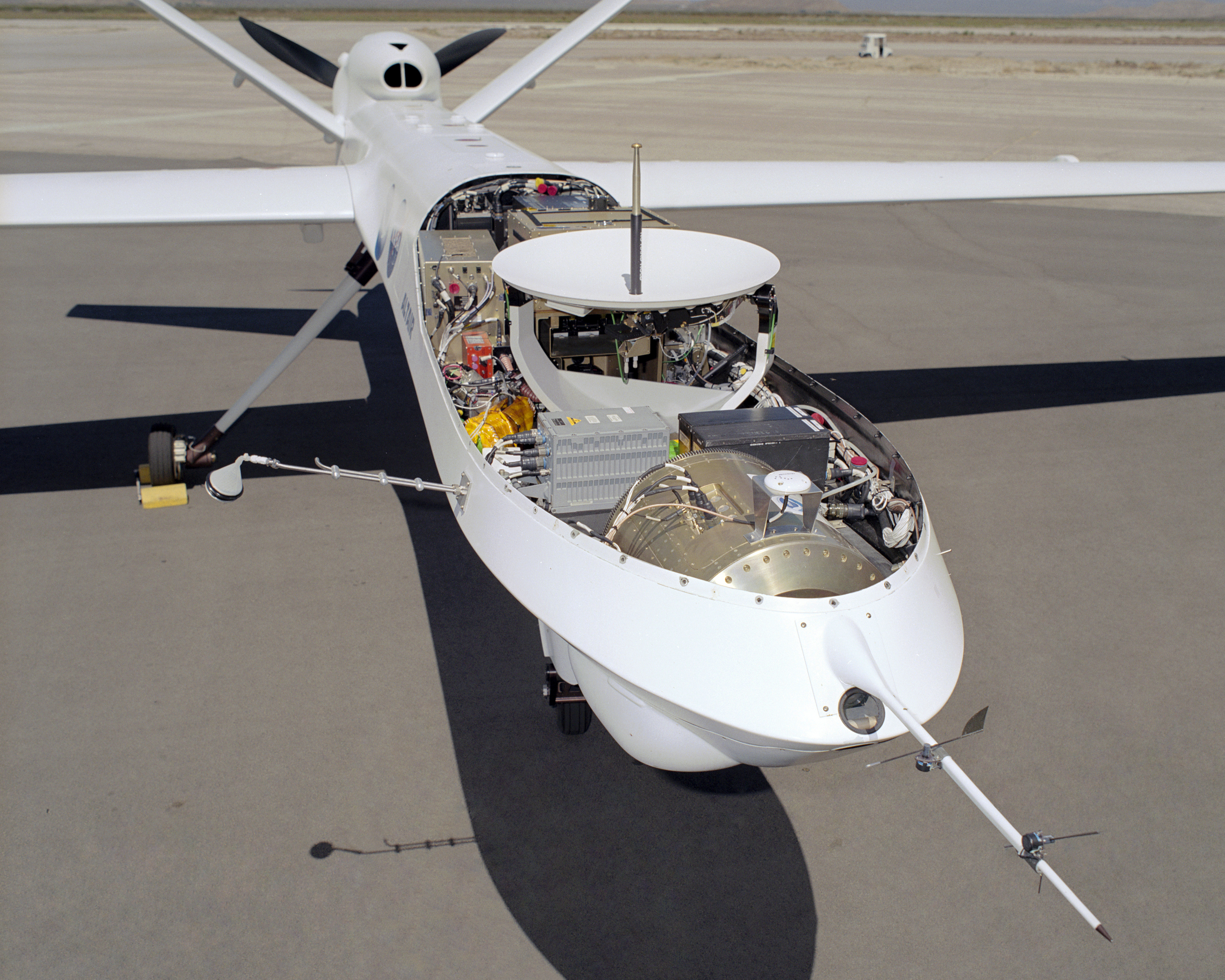
The satellite antenna and sensors of an NOAA-NASA flight demonstrator, 2005

MQ-9 Reaper crews (pilots and sensor operators), stationed at bases such as Creech Air Force Base, near Las Vegas, Nevada, can hunt for targets and observe terrain using multiple sensors, including a thermographic camera. One claim was that the onboard camera could read a license plate two miles (3.2 km) away. An operator's command takes 1.2 seconds to reach the drone via a satellite link.

The MQ-9 is fitted with six stores pylons. The inner stores pylons can carry a maximum of 1,500 pounds (680 kg) each and allow carriage of external fuel tanks. The mid-wing stores pylons can carry a maximum of 600 pounds (270 kg) each, while the outer stores pylons can carry a maximum of 200 pounds (91 kg) each. An MQ-9 with two 1,000-pound (450 kg) external fuel tanks and 1,000 pounds (450 kg) of munitions has an endurance of 42 hours. The Reaper has an endurance of 14 hours when fully loaded with munitions.

The MQ-9 carries a variety of weapons including the GBU-12 Paveway II laser-guided bomb, the AGM-114 Hellfire II air-to-ground missiles, the AIM-9 Sidewinder, GBU-38 Joint Direct Attack Munition (JDAM) and the GBU-39 Small Diameter Bomb. Tests are underway to allow for the addition of the AIM-92 Stinger air-to-air missile.

By October 2007, the USAF owned nine Reapers, and by December 2010 had 57 with plans to buy another 272, for a total of 329 Reapers. Critics have stated that the USAF's insistence on qualified pilots flying RPVs is a bottleneck to expanding deployment. USAF Major General William Rew stated on 5 August 2008, "For the way we fly them right now"—fully integrated into air operations and often flying missions alongside manned aircraft—"we want pilots to fly them." This reportedly has exacerbated losses of USAF aircraft in comparison with US Army operations. In March 2011, U.S. Department of Defense Secretary Robert Gates stated that, while manned aircraft are needed, the USAF must recognize "the enormous strategic and cultural implications of the vast expansion in remotely piloted vehicles..." and stated that as the service buys manned fighters and bombers, it must give equal weight to unmanned drones and "the service's important role in the cyber and space domains."

As of 2018 the USAF had taken delivery of 287 out of 366 MQ-9 Reapers on contract with General Atomics. The total program quantity is set at 433, including Foreign Military Sales.

In 2013, the Air Force Special Operations Command (AFSOC) sought the ability to pack up an MQ-9 in less than eight hours, fly it anywhere in the world aboard a C-17 Globemaster III, and then have it ready to fly in another eight hours to support special operations teams at places with no infrastructure. MQ-1 and MQ-9 drones must fly aboard cargo aircraft to travel long distances as they lack the refueling technology or speed to travel themselves; the C-17 is large enough to carry the aircraft and support systems and can land on short runways. Pilots traveling with the Reaper will use the ground control station to launch and land the aircraft, while most of the flying will be done by US-based pilots.

=== Testbed and upgrades ===
In November 2012, Raytheon completed ground verification tests for the ADM-160 MALD and MALD-J for integration onto the Reaper for an unmanned suppression of enemy air defenses capability. On 12 April 2013, a company-owned MQ-9 equipped with a jamming pod and digital receiver/exciter successfully demonstrated its electronic warfare capability at Marine Corps Air Station Yuma, performing its mission in coordination with over 20 participating aircraft. A second electronic warfare test, fitted with the Northrop Grumman Pandora EW System, was conducted on 22 October 2013 with other unmanned aircraft and Northrop Grumman EA-6B Prowlers, showing effectiveness in a multi-node approach against a more capable IADS.

In 2011, the U.S. Missile Defense Agency (MDA) reported its interest in using the Reaper and its MTS-B sensor to provide firing quality data for early interception of ballistic missile launches. The MDA is exploring concepts to use the UAV's EO/IR sensor to achieve "launch-on-remote" capabilities with missile interceptors before detection by Aegis radars. At least two aircraft would be needed to triangulate a target to provide high-fidelity data. The MTS-B includes short and mid-wave IR bands, optimal for tracking launch and rocket burn.

In 2013, the MDA terminated plans to build a follow-on to the two orbiting Space Tracking and Surveillance System (STSS) satellites due to near-term costs, opting to continue testing the Reaper for ballistic missile target discrimination. The MDA planned to test the improved MTS-C sensor, which adds a long-wave IR detector optimized for tracking cold bodies such as missiles and warheads after booster burnout, or plumes and exhaust. The goal was to use data from multiple high-flying UAVs to provide an offboard cue to launch an SM-3 missile from an Aegis ship. Two Reapers demonstrated their ability to track ballistic missiles using their MTS-B EO/IR turret during a test in late June 2016.

In June 2015, a study by the USAF's Scientific Advisory Board identified several improvements for operating the Reaper in contested airspace; adding readily available sensors, weapons, and threat detection and countermeasures could increase situational awareness and enable riskier deployments. Suggestions included a radar warning receiver (RWR) to know when it's being targeted, air-to-air and miniature air-to-ground weapons, manned-unmanned teaming, multi-UAV control, automatic take-offs and landings, and precision navigation and timing systems to fly in GPS-denied areas. Another idea was redesigned ground control stations with user-friendly video game-like controllers and touchscreen maps to access data without overwhelming operators.

In October 2015, Air Force Deputy Chief of Staff for ISR Robert Otto suggested redesigning the MQ-9's GCS to be operated by one person for most missions rather than two (to fly and work the sensors) to simplify operations and reduce manpower requirements by hundreds of sensor operators. Introducing an auto-land capability would also reduce the Reaper's manpower requirements to staff launch and recovery teams. Automatic take-off and landing capabilities are already present in the RQ-4 Global Hawk and MQ-1C Gray Eagle, and are planned to be provided to the MQ-9 in 2017. The Air Force requires the manually loaded Reaper to operate from a runway at least 5,000 ft (1.5 km) long, but automated take-offs and landings would enable it to operate from a 3,000 ft (0.91 km) runway.

In April 2017, an MQ-9 Block 5 flew with a Raytheon ALR-69A RWR in its payload pod to demonstrate the aircraft's ability to conduct missions in the proximity of threat radars and air defenses, the first time this capability was demonstrated on a remotely piloted aircraft. In September 2020, a Reaper was flown carrying two Hellfire missiles on each of the stations previously reserved for 227 kg (500 lb) bombs or fuel tanks. A software upgrade doubled the aircraft's capacity to eight missiles.

The Pentagon wants to upgrade the MQ-9 Reaper with directed-energy weapons such as low-powered laser and high-powered microwave beams. A high-field optical module to act on the human nervous system is also under consideration.

In September 2020, GA-ASI conducted captive carry tests of the Sparrowhawk Small Unmanned Aircraft System (sUAS) on the MQ-9, with the Reaper itself acting as a drone mothership. The MQ-9B Sky Guardian will be able to carry up to four Sparrowhawks.

== Design ==
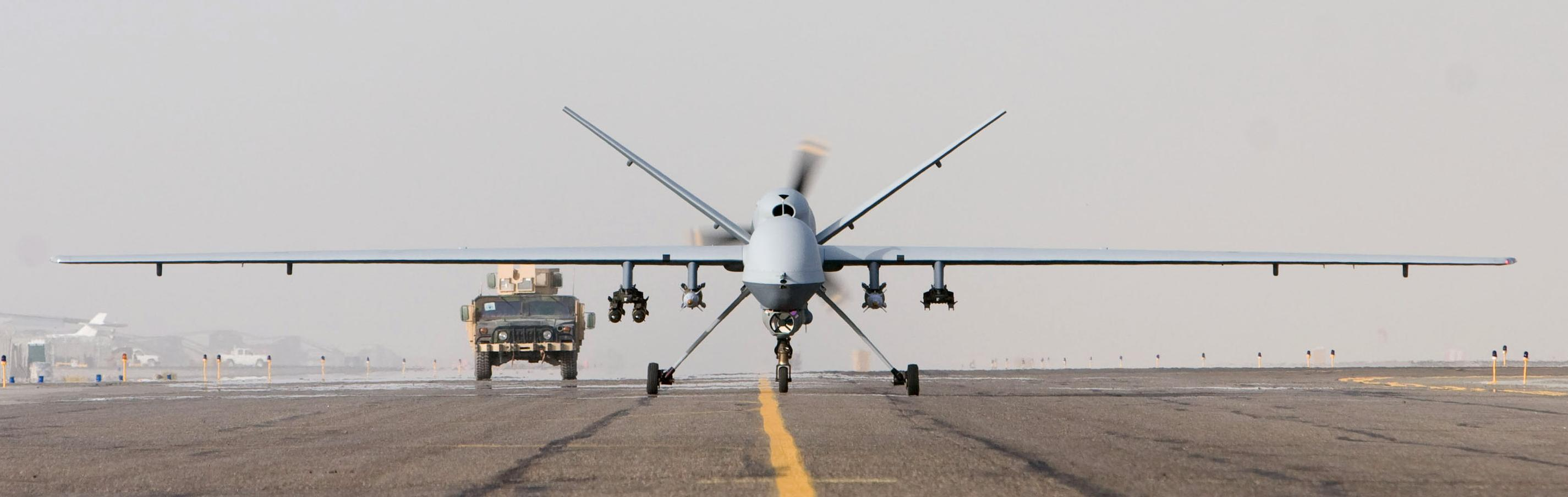
An MQ-9 taxiing in Afghanistan, 2007

A typical MQ-9 system consists of multiple aircraft, ground control station, communications equipment, maintenance spares, and personnel. A military flight crew includes a pilot, sensor operator, and Mission Intelligence Coordinator. The aircraft is powered by a 950 horsepower (710 kW) turboprop, with a maximum speed of about 260 knots (480 km/h; 300 mph) and a cruising speed of 150–170 knots (170–200 mph; 280–310 km/h).

With a 66 ft (20 m) wingspan, and a maximum payload of 3,800 lb (1,700 kg), the MQ-9 can be armed with a variety of weaponry, including Hellfire missiles and 500 lb (230 kg) laser-guided bomb units. Its endurance is 30 hours when conducting ISR missions, which decreases to 23 hours if it is carrying a full weapons load. The Reaper has a range of 1,000 nmi (1,150 mi; 1,850 km) and an operational altitude of 25,000 ft (7,600 m), which makes it especially useful for long-term loitering operations, both for surveillance and support of ground troops.

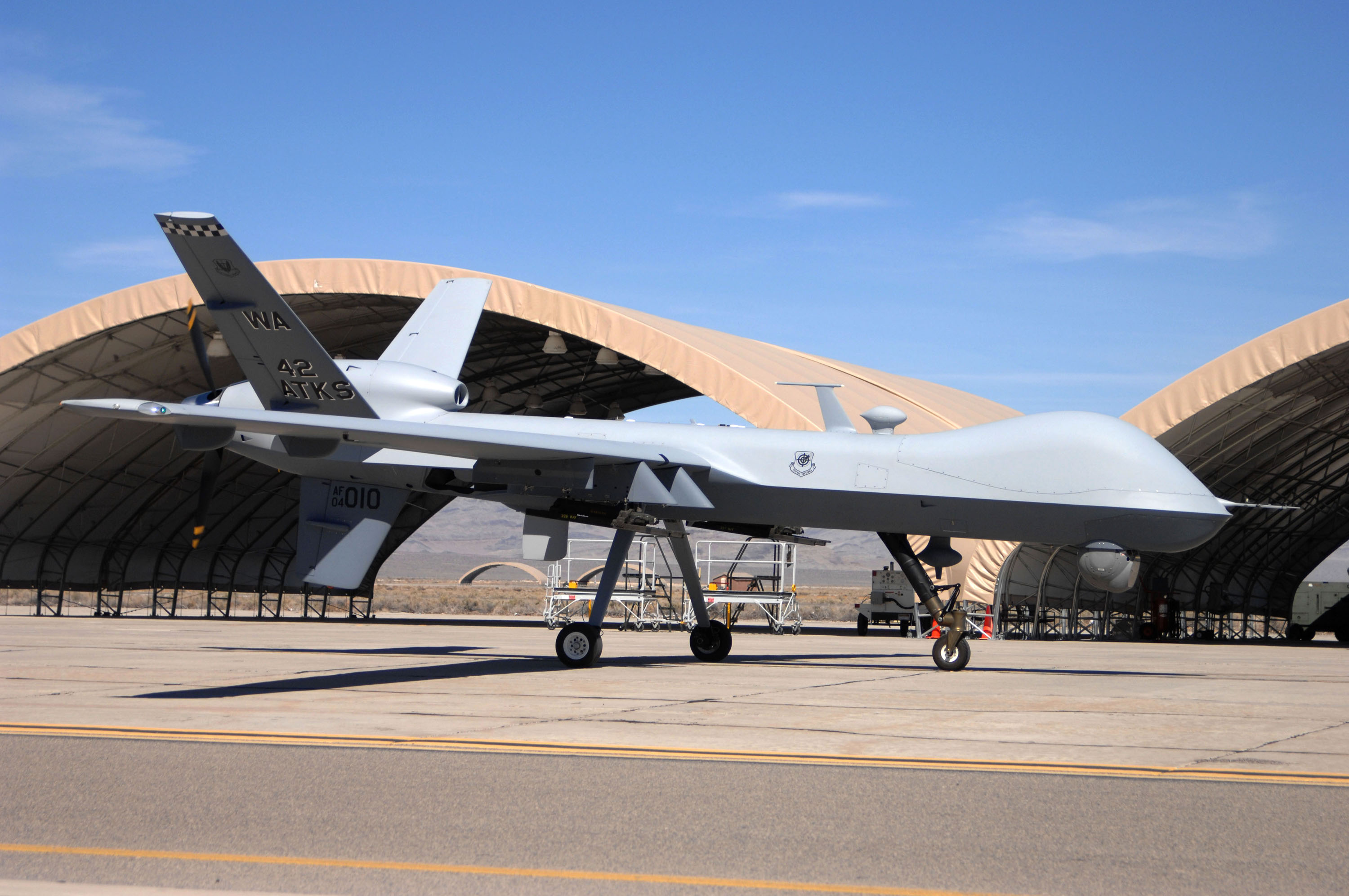
The first MQ-9 arriving at Creech AFB, March 2007

The Predator and Reaper were designed for military operations and not intended to operate among crowded airline traffic. The aircraft typically lack systems capable of complying with FAA See-And-Avoid regulations. In 2005, requests were made for MQ-9s to be used in search and rescue operations following Hurricane Katrina but, as there was no FAA authorization in place at the time, it was not used. On 18 May 2006, the Federal Aviation Administration (FAA) issued a certificate of authorization allowing MQ-1 and MQ-9 UAVs to fly in U.S. civil airspace to search for survivors of disasters.

An MQ-9 can adopt various mission kits and combinations of weapon and sensor payloads to meet combat requirements. Its Raytheon AN/AAS-52 multi-spectral targeting sensor suite includes a color/monochrome daylight TV, infrared, and image-intensified TV with laser rangefinder/laser designator to designate targets for laser guided munitions. The aircraft is also equipped with the Lynx Multi-mode Radar that contains synthetic aperture radar (SAR) that can operate in both spotlight and strip modes, and ground moving target indication (GMTI) with Dismount Moving Target Indicator (DMTI) and Maritime Wide-Area Search (MWAS) capabilities.

The Reaper was used as a test bed for Gorgon Stare, a wide-area surveillance sensor system. Increment 1 of the system was first fielded in March 2011 on the Reaper and could cover an area of 16 km^{2} (6.2 mi^{2}); increment 2, incorporating ARGUS-IS and expanding the coverage area to 100 km^{2} (39 mi^{2}), achieved initial operating capability (IOC) in early 2014. The system has 368 cameras capable of capturing five million pixels each to create an image of about 1.8 billion pixels; video is collected at 12 frames per second, producing several terabytes of data per minute.

In January 2012, General Atomics released a new trailing arm design for the Reaper's main landing gear. Benefits include an over 30% increase in landing weight capacity, a 12% increase in gross takeoff weight (from 10,500 pounds (4,800 kg) to 11,700 pounds (5,300 kg)), a maintenance-free shock absorber (eliminating the need for nitrogen pressurization), a fully rejected takeoff brake system, and provisions for automatic takeoff and landing capability and Anti-lock Brake System (ABS) field upgrades. In April 2012, General Atomics announced possible upgrades to USAF Reapers, including two extra 100-US-gallon (380 L; 83 imp gal) fuel pods under the wings to increase endurance to 37 hours. The wingspan can also be increased to 88 feet (27 m), increasing endurance to 42 hours.

The USAF has bought 38 Reaper Extended Range (ER) versions, carrying external fuel tanks (which do not affect weapon capacity), the heavy-weight landing gear, a four-bladed propeller, a new fuel management system that ensures fuel and thermal balance among external tank, wing, and fuselage fuel sources, and an alcohol-water injection (AWI) system to shorten required runway takeoff length. These features increase endurance from 27 to 33–35 hours, while the company is still pitching the lengthened wing option. The Reaper ER first flew operationally in August 2015.

The aircraft also has the sensor ball replaced with a high-definition camera, better communications that allow ground controllers to see the higher quality video, software to enable automatic detection of threats and tracking of 12 moving targets at once, and the ability to "super ripple"-fire missiles within 0.32 seconds of each other.

On 25 February 2016, General Atomics announced a successful test flight of the new Predator-B/ER version. The new version had an extended wingspan of 79 feet (24 m), increasing its endurance to 40 hours. Other improvements included short-field takeoff and landing performance, spoilers on the wings to enable precision automatic landings and provision on the wings for leading-edge de-ice and integrated low- and high-band RF antennas.

== Operational history ==
=== U.S. Air Force ===
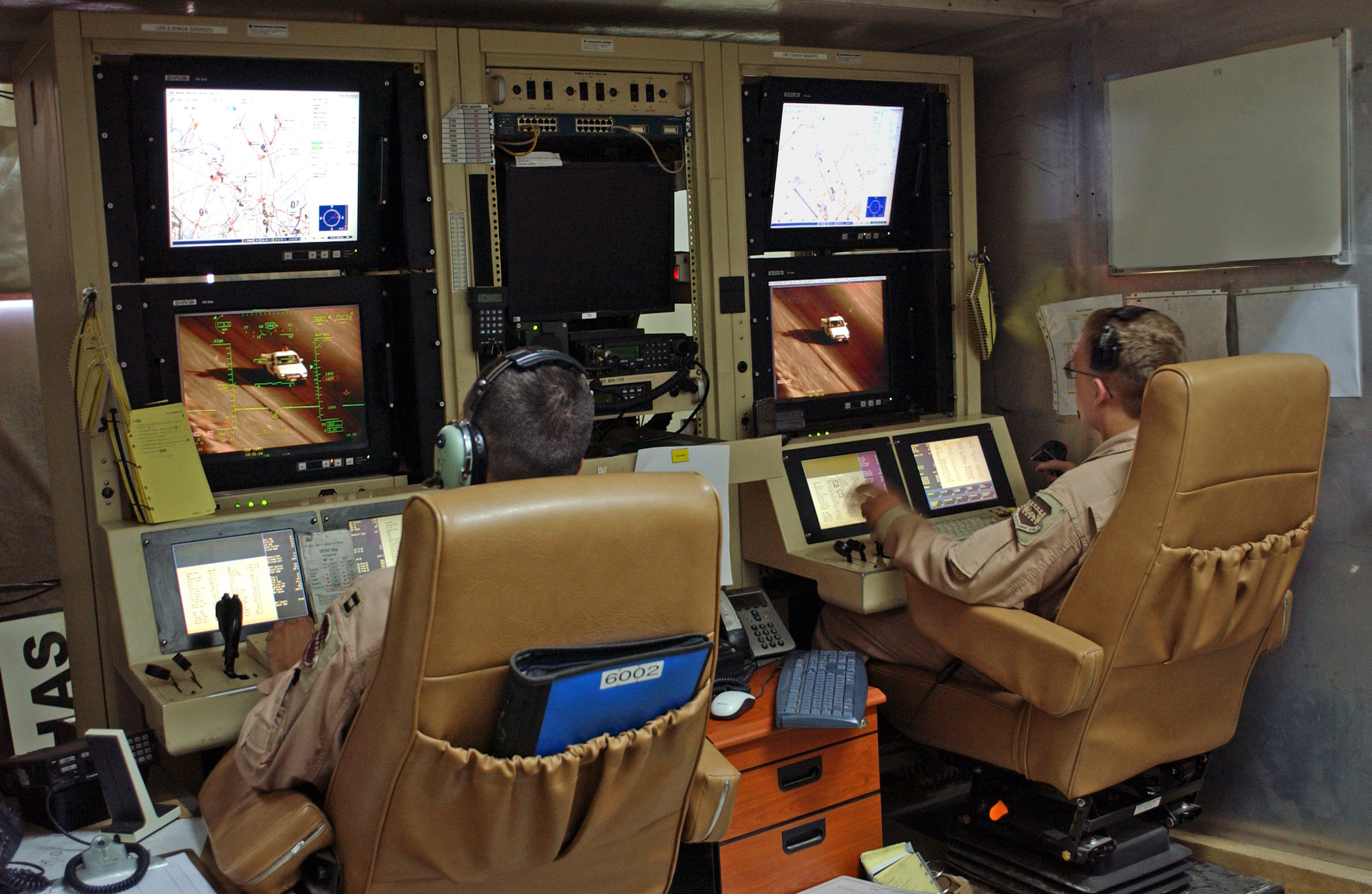
MQ-1 UAV Flight Crew at Joint Base Balad (LSA Anaconda), Iraq, 7 August 2007

On 1 May 2007, the U.S. Air Force activated its 432nd Wing to operate MQ-9 Reapers and MQ-1 Predators at Creech Air Force Base, Nevada. The pilots first conducted combat missions in Iraq and Afghanistan that summer. On 28 October 2007, an MQ-9 achieved its first "kill", firing a Hellfire missile against Afghan insurgents in the Deh Rawood region of the mountainous Oruzgan province. By 6 March 2008, according to Air Force Lieutenant General Gary North, the Reaper had attacked 16 targets in Afghanistan using 500 lb (230 kg) bombs and Hellfire missiles.

In 2008, the New York Air National Guard 174th Attack Wing began to switch from F-16 fighters to Reapers, becoming the first fighter unit to convert entirely to unmanned combat aerial vehicle (UCAV) use. On 17 July 2008, the USAF began flying Reaper missions within Iraq from Balad Air Base. It was reported on 11 August 2008 that the 174th Fighter Wing would consist entirely of Reapers. By March 2009 the USAF had 28 operational Reapers. Beginning in September 2009, Reapers were deployed by the Africa Command to the Seychelles islands for use in Indian Ocean anti-piracy patrols.

On 13 September 2009, positive control of an MQ-9 was lost during a combat mission over Afghanistan, after which the control-less drone started flying towards the Afghan border with Tajikistan. An F-15E Strike Eagle fired an AIM-9 missile at the drone, successfully destroying its engine. Before the drone impacted the ground, contact was reestablished with the drone, and it was flown into a mountain to destroy it. It was the first US drone to be destroyed intentionally by allied forces.

By July 2010, thirty-eight Predators and Reapers had been lost during combat operations in Afghanistan and Iraq, another nine were lost in training missions in the U.S. In 2010, the USAF conducted over 33,000 close air support missions, a more-than-20 percent increase compared with 2009. By March 2011, the USAF had 48 Predator and Reaper combat air patrols flying in Iraq and Afghanistan compared with 18 in 2007.

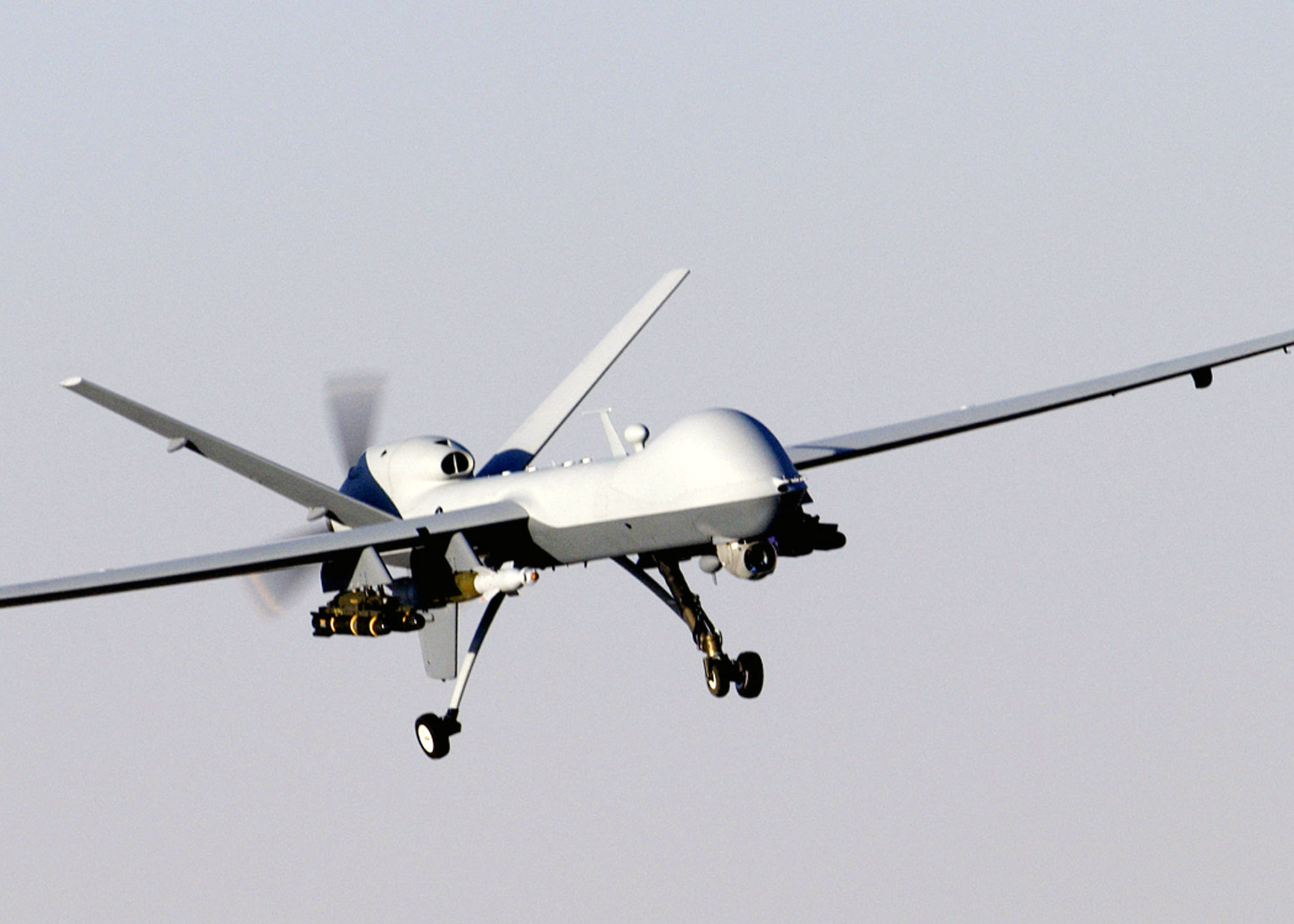
An MQ-9A Reaper in Afghanistan, 2007

As of March 2011, the USAF was training more pilots for advanced unmanned aerial vehicles than for any other single weapons system. In 2012, the Reaper, Predator and Global Hawk were described as "... the most accident-prone aircraft in the Air Force fleet."

In October 2011, the USAF began operating Reapers out of Arba Minch Airport in Ethiopia for surveillance-only operations in Somalia. In 2012, both Reapers and Predators were deployed in Benghazi, Libya after the attack that killed the US ambassador in that city. In February 2013, the U.S. stationed a Predator at Niamey to provide intelligence for French forces during Operation Serval in Mali; it was later replaced by two MQ-9 Reapers. In April 2013, one of these Reapers crashed on a surveillance flight due to mechanical failure.

On 22 October 2013, the USAF fleets of MQ-1 Predator and MQ-9 Reaper UAVs reached 2,000,000 flight hours. The RPA program began in the mid-1990s, taking 16 years to reach 1 million flight hours; the 2 million hour mark was reached just two and a half years later.

The high demand for UAVs has caused Air Combat Command to increase pilot output from 188 in 2015 to 300 in 2017 at Holloman.

On 13 November 2015, the Pentagon reported that an MQ-9 had killed ISIL member Mohammed Emwazi, popularly known as "Jihadi John", who had executed several Western prisoners.

In 2015, a record number (20) of USAF drones crashed; investigators identified three parts of the starter-generator that were susceptible to breakdowns, but could not determine why they were failing. Col. William S. Leister informed Pentagon officials that investigators from the USAF, General Atomics and Skurka had investigated the problem for more than a year. The team, he said, had identified "numerous manufacturing quality issues" yet had been unable to determine the exact cause of the failures.

On 2 October 2017, U.S. Central Command stated that an MQ-9 had been shot down by Houthi air defense systems over Sanaa in western Yemen the previous day. The aircraft had departed from Chabelley Airport in Djibouti, and had been armed.

On 18 September 2018, the USAF announced that an MQ-9 armed with an air-to-air missile successfully shot down a smaller target drone in November 2017. The drone was operated by the 432nd Wing. While the destruction of a target drone is a routine USAF exercise, this event was the first instance of a Reaper destroying a small, maneuvering aerial target.

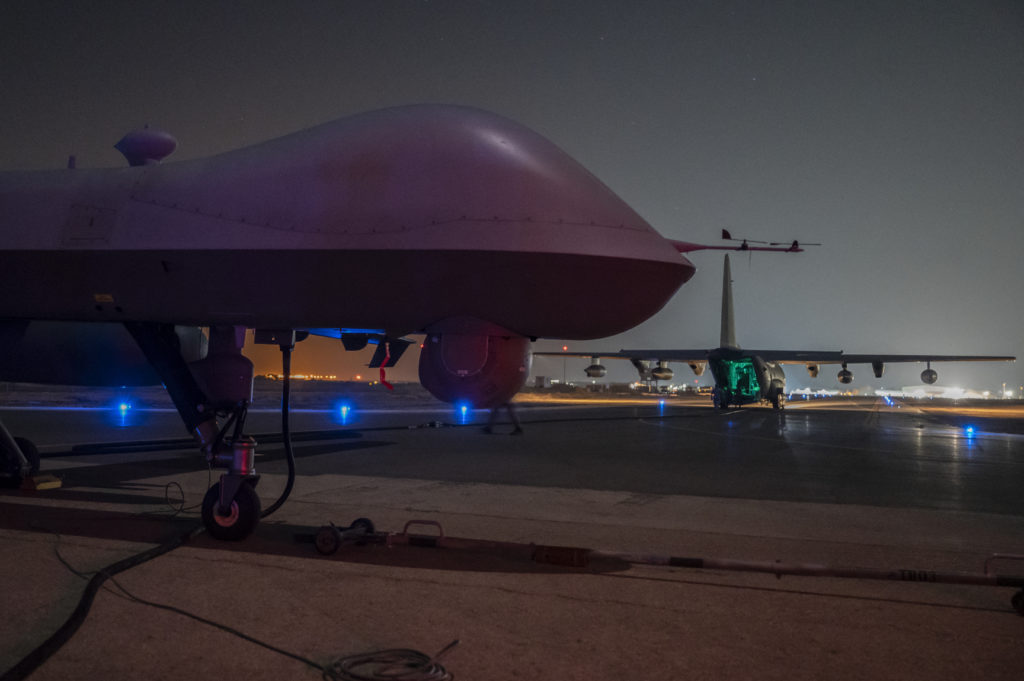
MQ-9 Reaper at a forward area refueling point (FARP) in December 2022

On 6 June 2019, Houthis shot down a US MQ-9 Reaper over Yemen. According to United States Central Command, it was shot down by an SA-6 surface-to-air missile that was enabled with Iranian assistance. On 21 August 2019, another unarmed MQ-9 was shot down by Houthis over Dhamar, Yemen, by a Yemeni-made Fater-1 missile, an improved SA-6.

On 23 November 2019, a US MQ-9 Reaper was shot down by a Pantsir system operated by the Libyan National Army or Wagner Group over Tripoli, Libya. According to journalist David Cenciotti, the drone was lost after being jammed by Russian Wagner militias working in support of the Libyan National Army.

On 3 January 2020, a US MQ-9 missile strike at Baghdad International Airport killed Qasem Soleimani, the commander of the Iranian Quds Force, and Abu Mahdi al-Muhandis, the deputy commander of Iraqi Popular Mobilization Forces.

On 18 August 2020, US Department of Defense announced that two US MQ-9 Reapers had crashed in a mid-air collision over Syria. However, claims from local media said that at least one drone might have been shot down by Syrian Opposition rebel fighters or Turkish forces.

In April 2021, U.S. and Polish militaries agreed on a long-negotiated plan to increase the American presence in Poland with two units of MQ-9 Reapers deployed by the USAF.

On 14 July 2022, an MQ-9 Reaper operated by the 25th Attack Group crashed during a training mission in Romania. The MQ-9 drones have been deployed to the Romanian 71st Air Base in 2021, starting their operational flights on 1 February 2021.

U.S. Air Force MQ-9 intercepted by Russian Su-27 over the Black Sea (0:42)

On 14 March 2023, one of two intercepting Russian Su-27 fighters collided with an MQ-9 Reaper flying in international airspace over the Black Sea. US Air Force Gen. James Hecker, commander of the United States Air Forces in Europe – Air Forces Africa, stated, "At approximately 7:03 am (CET), one of the Russian Su-27 aircraft struck the propeller of the MQ-9, causing U.S. forces to have to bring the MQ-9 down in international waters. Several times before the collision, the Su-27s dumped fuel on and flew in front of the MQ-9 in a reckless, environmentally unsound and unprofessional manner. This incident demonstrates a lack of competence in addition to being unsafe and unprofessional." Russia said it would attempt to retrieve the drone. The US government claimed that it was prepared for such an outcome. John Kirby, National Security Council Coordinator for Strategic Communications, said that "their ability to exploit useful intelligence will be highly minimised". While the US Chairman of the Joint Chiefs of Staff Gen. Mark A. Milley said that there were "mitigating measures" to ensure that Russia obtained no access to valuable technology. He also confirmed that the US would look for the drone as well; however, the water in which it crashed was 4,000 to 5,000 feet (1,200 to 1,500 m) deep. Brigadier General Pat Ryder said the drone was left "unflyable and uncontrollable" and likely damaged the Su-27 during the collision. The US has since released footage over the Black Sea.

On 23 July 2023, a Russian fighter aircraft intercepted a US Air Force MQ-9 over Syria and deployed flares in front of it, damaging the propeller. The drone returned to base safely. It was the third near-collision of an MQ-9 with Russian aircraft over Syria that month, with previous incidents on 5 July and 6 July.

On 8 November 2023, Houthi rebels in Yemen shot down a US Air Force MQ-9 over the Red Sea amid the attacks on U.S. bases in Iraq and Syria.

On 18 January 2024, the Islamic Resistance of Iraq claimed to have shot down a US MQ-9 Reaper drone after it took off from Kuwait near Muqdadiyah, Diyala Governorate.

On 19 February 2024, Houthi rebels in Yemen shot down a US Air Force MQ-9 over the port city Al Hudaydah amid attacks on U.S. bases in Iraq and Syria.

On 25 April 2024, Houthi rebels shot down a US MQ-9 over the Saada Governorate in Yemen. The USAF acknowledged that an MQ-9 crashed in Yemen, and that an investigation was underway.

During the Gaza war, at least six US MQ-9 Reapers were flown over the Gaza Strip to assist Israel with reconnaissance efforts.

On 24 May 2024, the Houthi group claimed to have shot down a U.S. MQ-9 over Sanaa. On 29 May 2024, an American MQ-9 crashed in Yemen.

On 4 August 2024, an American MQ-9 was reportedly shot down in Yemen by the Houthis.

On 10 and 16 September 2024, two American MQ-9A Reaper drones were shot down over Yemen by Houthi rebels, the latter in Dhamar province. Both losses were confirmed by the US military.

On 8 November 2024, the Houthis claimed to have downed an American MQ-9 Reaper in Yemen's al-Jawf province, an incident being investigated by the US military.

On 28 December 2024, Yemen's Houthis claimed that it had shot down a U.S. MQ-9 while carrying out hostile missions in the skies of Al Bayda Governorate.

On 4 March 2025, the Houthis said they had shot down a Reaper drone over Hodeidah, claiming it to be their 15th MQ-9 downing since the start of the Gaza war in 2023. The USAF acknowledged it had lost contact with a drone. On 19 April 2025, Fox News reported a fifth MQ-9 shot down over Yemen since U.S. Central Command began daily airstrikes on the Houthis on 15 March. On April 25, 2025, CNN reported since the launch of the major military campaign in March 2025 by the US targeting the Houthi rebel group in Yemen, the group had successfully shot down at least seven MQ-9s.

=== 2026 Iran war ===
On 26 May 2026, Iran said that it intercepted a US MQ-9 Reaper drone following alleged violation of the country's airspace during the 2026 Iran war ceasefire. On 1 June, the US confirmed that Iran downed the drone.

On 13 August 2026, the Washington Post reported, citing 3 officials, that 25 percent of the MQ-9 fleet operated by the US ("at least" 52 units), had been shot down in clashes with Iran. A subsequent Pentagon Inspector General report cited by an October 2026 report by The Intercept recorded that 30 MQ-9 Reaper drones were destroyed or damaged on the ground in Iranian attacks on U.S. military bases.

As of November 2026, 53 U.S. MQ-9s have been lost amid the 2026 Iran war, many were shot down while others were destroyed on the ground from Iranian airstrikes.

The Pentagon is phasing out the Reaper and aims to replace it with a fleet of cheaper armed surveillance drones.

=== NASA ===
NASA Predator B variants

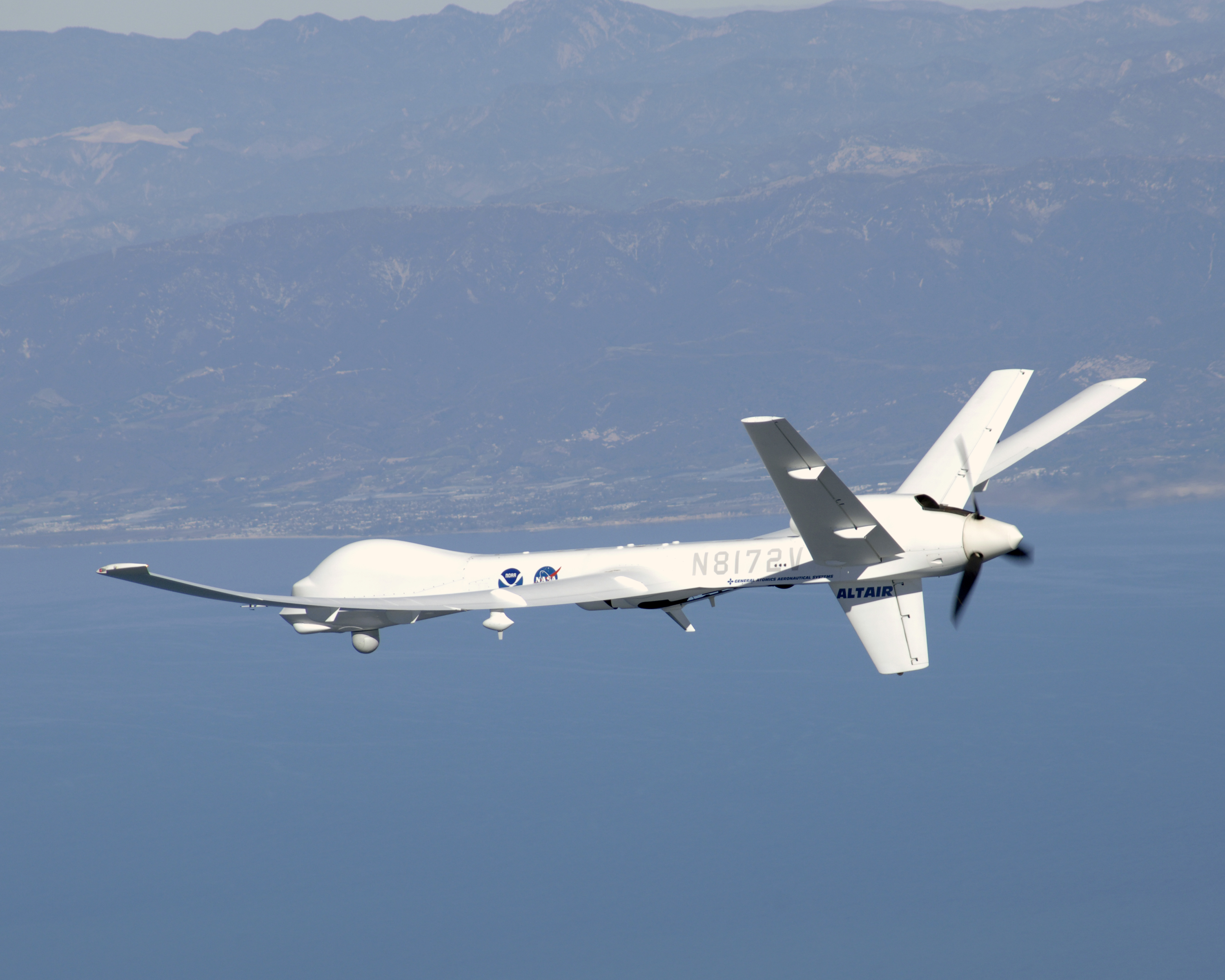
NASA's Predator B, Altair variant

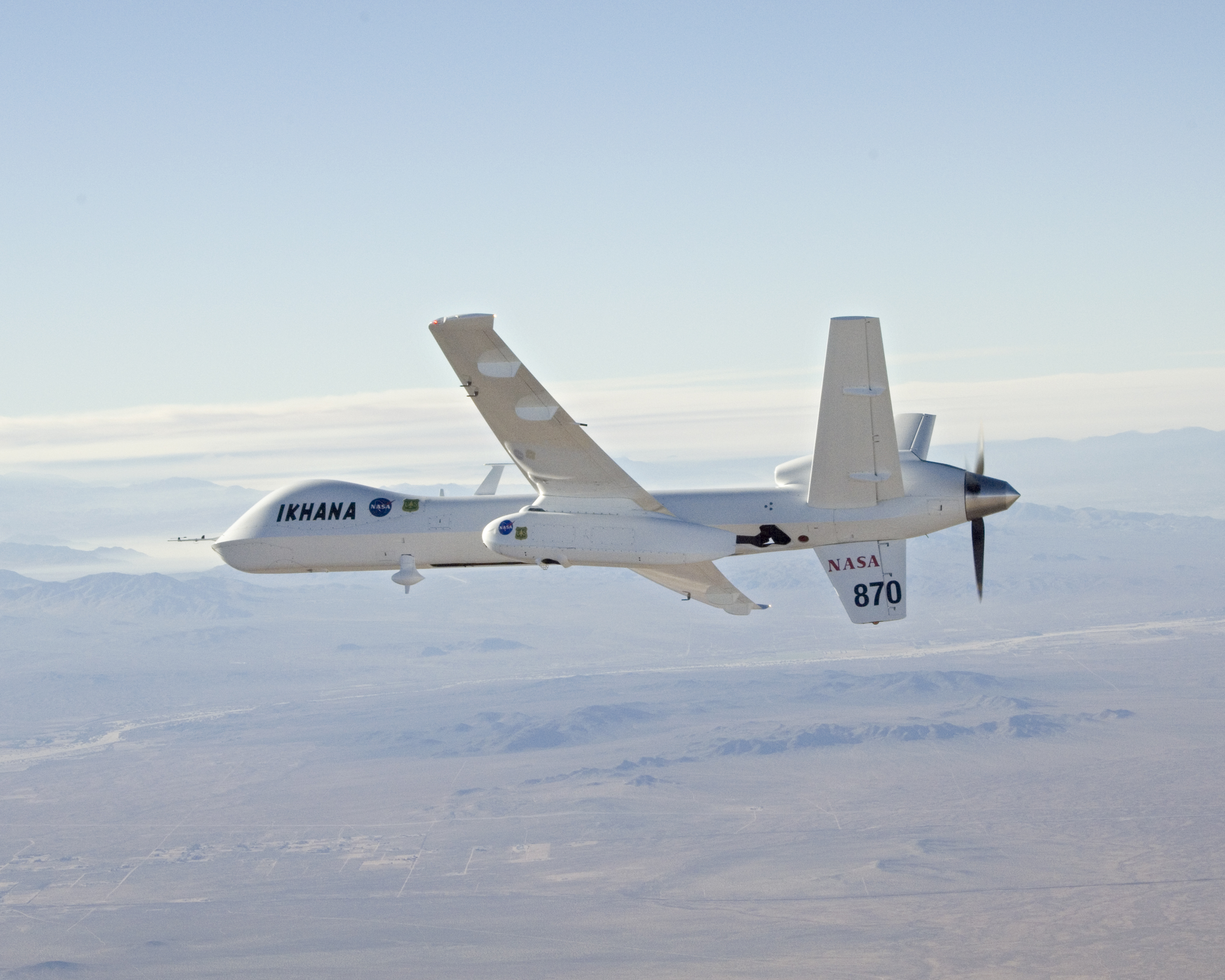
NASA's Predator B, Ikhana variant

The National Aeronautics and Space Administration (NASA) initially expressed interest in a production version of the B-002 turbofan-powered variant, but instead leased an unarmed Reaper variant, which carries the GA-ASI company name "Altair". Altair is one of the first three "Predator-B" airframes. The other two airframes, known as "Predator-B 001" and "Predator-B 002", had a maximum gross weight of 7,500 pounds (3,400 kg).

The Altair differs in that it has an 86-foot (26 m) wingspan (20 ft (6.1 m) greater than early and current MQ-9s). The Altair has enhanced avionics systems to better enable flights in FAA-controlled civil airspace and demonstrate "over-the-horizon" command and control capability from a ground station. These aircraft are used by NASA's Earth Science Enterprise as part of the NASA ERAST Program to perform on-location science missions.

==== Dryden Flight Research Center ====
In November 2006, NASA's Dryden Flight Research Center obtained an MQ-9 (and mobile ground control station), named Ikhana, for the Suborbital Science Program within the Science Mission Directorate. In 2007, Ikhana was used to survey the Southern California wildfires, supporting firefighter deployments based upon the highest need. The California Office of Emergency Services requested NASA support for the Esperanza Fire, and the General Atomics Altair was launched less than 24 hours later on a 16-hour mission to map the fire's perimeter. Western States Fire Missions continued to 2009, using an Autonomous Modular Sensor (AMS) capable of peering through thick smoke and haze and linked in near-real time to the Interagency Fire Center in Boise, Idaho. The fire mapping research is a joint project of NASA and the US Forest Service.

The NASA Ikhana was used to survey the descent of the Orion Exploration Flight Test 1 (EFT-1) module on its first test mission 5 December 2014. The aircraft loitered at 27,000 ft (8,200 m), used its IR camera to detect the capsule, then switched to the optical camera to observe its descent through parachute deployment and landing in the Pacific Ocean. Ikhana was retired in 2018.

=== U.S. Homeland Security ===
U.S. Customs and Border Protection's Predator B

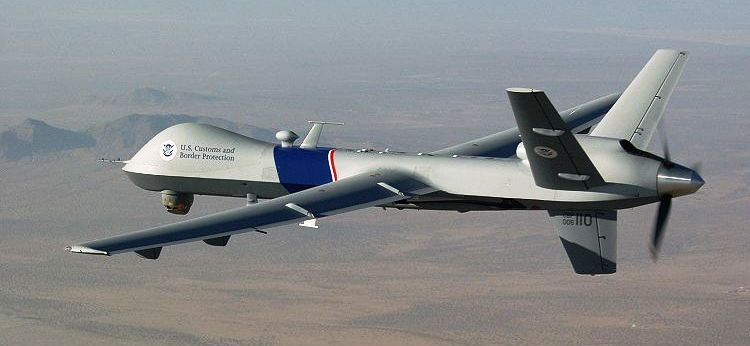
CBP's Predator B

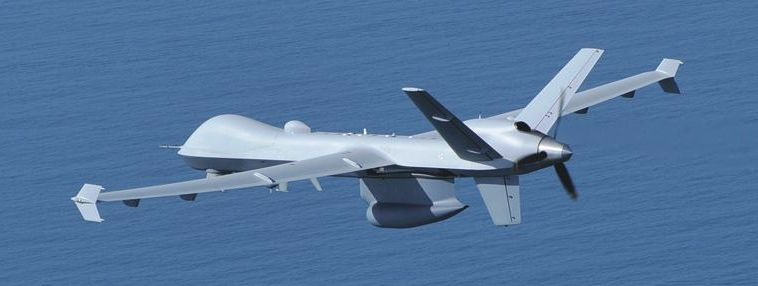
CBP's Predator B, Guardian variant

A CBP Predator B directs border agents towards a migrant group crossing the US–Mexico border using thermal video, circa 2008

U.S. Customs and Border Protection (CBP) operated nine MQ-9s in August 2012. Two were based in North Dakota at Grand Forks Air Force Base, four were based in Arizona, at Fort Huachuca and one was based at the Naval Air Station Corpus Christi, Texas. These aircraft were equipped with GA-ASI's Lynx synthetic aperture radar and Raytheon's MTS-B electro-optical infrared sensors.

The CBP also had two maritime MQ-9s, called Guardians, based at Cape Canaveral Air Force Station, Florida, and Naval Air Station Corpus Christi, Texas. The Guardians were equipped with the SeaVue marine search radar; their electro-optical infrared sensor was optimized for maritime operations. The CBP operates one MQ-9 Guardian jointly with the U.S. Coast Guard (USCG) out of land-based stations in Florida and Texas.

The United States Department of Homeland Security initially ordered one Predator B for border protection duty, referred to as MQ-9 CBP-101. It began operations 4 October 2005 and crashed in the Arizona desert on 25 April 2006. The US's NTSB determined that the crash's most likely cause was pilot error by the ground-based pilot, inadvertently shutting down the UAV's engine by failing to follow the checklist. During its operational period, the aircraft flew 959 hours on patrol and played a role in 2,309 arrests. It also contributed to the seizure of four vehicles and 8,267 pounds (3,750 kg) of marijuana.

A second Predator B, called "CBP-104" (initially referred to as "CBP-102"), was delivered in September 2006 and commenced limited border protection operations on 18 October 2006. The president's FY2006 emergency supplemental budget request added $45 million for the program and the FY2007 Homeland Security Appropriations Bill added an additional $20 million. In October 2006, GA-ASI announced a $33.9 million contract to supply two more Predator B systems by the fall 2007. On 16 February 2009, the program was further expanded to include patrols of the Canada–US border.

In February 2009, an MQ-9 began patrolling the Manitoba portion of the U.S.-Canada border and the Great Lakes region, as well as Akwesasne Mohawk territory in Ontario and northern New York. The UAV was based at Grand Forks Air Force Base and watched the 400 km (250 mi)-long border. The drone does not carry weapons and needs permission to enter Canadian airspace.

In January 2014, Customs and Border Protection grounded its UAVs temporarily after an unmanned aircraft was ditched off the coast of California by the operator due to a mechanical failure on 27 January 2014.

On 29 May 2020, during the George Floyd protests, CBP flew an unarmed Predator B drone above Minneapolis to watch protesters. The agency said it was at the request of federal law enforcement in Minneapolis.

=== U.S. Marine Corps ===
Marine Unmanned Aerial Vehicle Squadron 1 (VMU-1) began operations with the MQ-9 on a contractor-owned, contractor-operated basis in 2018, and accepted delivery of the Marine Corps' first two MQ-9A air frames in September 2021. Marine Unmanned Aerial Vehicle Squadron 3 (VMU-3), based out of MCAS Kaneohe Bay, HI, received their first two MQ-9A air frames in April 2023, and reached initial operational capability (IOC) ahead of schedule in August 2023. Marine Unmanned Aerial Vehicle Squadron 2 (VMU-2) was re-designated as VMUT-2 in July 2023. VMUT-2 will serve as the Fleet Replacement Squadron and training squadron for the Marine Corps' UAS officers and enlisted sensor operators.

=== Other users ===
==== Belgium ====
In January 2018, the Belgian Ministry of Defence reportedly decided on the MQ-9 to fulfill its medium-altitude long-range UAV requirement. Ministry officials stated that a request for information had been sent to potential suppliers of the system, and that they had received responses from all of them. In October 2018, Belgium confirmed its selection of the MQ-9B SkyGuardian variant, adding that it would be considered a "reconnaissance" asset, suggesting it will not be used to carry weapons. In March 2019, the US Department of State approved the sale of four MQ-9B SkyGuardian UAVs to Belgium for $600 million (~$744 million in 2025), pending approval by US Congress. In July 2022, work began on adapting the Florennes Air Base to host, fly and maintain the planes.

==== Canada ====
On 19 December 2023, Canada announced a CA$2.49-billion contract for 11 MQ-9Bs, 219 Hellfire missiles, and 12 Mk82 500-lb bombs. The contract also includes six ground control stations, two new aircraft hangars, training and sustainment. The MQ-9Bs are to be stationed at 14 Wing Greenwood with 55 personnel and 19 Wing Comox, B.C with 25 personnel and in Ottawa with 160 staff at the main ground control centre and personnel forward deploying in northern Canada as required. Construction for the infrastructure to house and operate the drones is expected to begin in 2025.

In fall 2024, production began on the first two MQ-9Bs. The drones are to begin testing in 2026 before deliveries start in 2028.

==== Dominican Republic ====
The Predator UAV "Guardian" has been used by the Dominican Republic, under U.S. supervision and funding, against drug trafficking from mid-2012.

==== France ====
On 31 May 2013, French Defense Minister Jean-Yves Le Drian confirmed the order of two MQ-9 Reapers, to be delivered by the end of 2013. It was chosen to replace the EADS Harfang and was picked over the Israeli Heron TP. On 27 June 2013, the U.S. Defense Security Cooperation Agency notified Congress of a possible Foreign Military Sale to France for 16 unarmed MQ-9s, associated equipment, ground control hardware, and support, worth up to $1.5 billion total. On 26 August 2013, France and the US Department of Defense concluded the deal for 16 Reapers and 8 ground control stations, with French operators beginning training.

On 24 September 2013, France's first pair of MQ-9 pilots conducted a two-hour training sortie at Holloman Air Force Base, New Mexico. Both French pilots had prior UAV experience and went through a five-week ground-based training course and 5 hours on a flight simulator before the first flight. Two additional crews were also receiving instruction at the facility. General Atomics is due to deliver two Reapers and one ground control station to the French Air Force by the end of 2013. On 26 November 2013, France declared that six pilots in three teams were operational, following 100 hours on flight simulators and 4 flights. French MQ-9s were first put into action in January 2014 at Niamey Air Base in Niger for border reconnaissance in the Sahel desert.

On 16 January 2014, France's first MQ-9 flight occurred from Niger. The first two Reapers to enter French service are designated Block 1 and use U.S. equipment; further orders are to be modified with European payloads such as sensors and data links. On 31 March 2014, French Air Force Reapers accumulated 500 flight hours in support of Operation Serval. In July 2014, a French MQ-9 helped to locate the wreckage of Air Algérie Flight 5017, which had crashed in Mali.

==== Germany ====
Germany made a request to purchase five Reapers and four ground control stations, plus related support material and training. The request, being made through the Foreign Military Sales process, was presented to Congress through the Defense Security Cooperation Agency on 1 August 2008 and is valued at US$205 million (~$301 million in 2025). However, Germany did not go through with this procurement for the time being and decided to lease the IAI Heron offered by IAI and Rheinmetall instead, initially for the duration of one year, representing a stop-gap measure before a long-term decision on a Medium-altitude long-endurance ('MALE') UAV is being made.

==== Greece ====
On 21 April 2022, a well-known Greek military journalist revealed in an interview that the Hellenic Air Force is discussing the purchase of three MQ-9 UCAVs along with the Israeli Heron TPs. Given that the US Air Force has long been operating MQ-9s from Larissa Air Base, Greece has some past experience with it from joint exercises. On 5 July 2022, the Hellenic Parliament approved the acquisition of three MQ-9B SeaGuardian UAVs along with two ground stations. On 28 July 2022, the Greek Minister for National Defence, Nikolaos Panagiotopoulos, confirmed the acquisition of the three UAVs.

==== India ====
===== Lease =====
In November 2020, the Indian Navy began operating two leased MQ-9B SeaGuardians. The lease agreement was valid for one year and has been extended subsequently. The drones are deployed at the Naval Air Station Rajali located in Tamil Nadu and had logged close to 3,000 hours covering over 14 million square miles by August 2022.

On 18 September 2024, one of the leased drones of the Indian Navy crashed into the Bay of Bengal off Chennai coast during a routine surveillance flight. General Atomics is expected to replace the lost drone. As per the lease agreement signed between the Navy and General Atomics. General Atomics has been given the responsibility to operate the drones for a certain amount of hours per month for the Indian Navy. The operations and maintenance is carried out from a ground control centre at INS Rajali near Chennai. On 3 February 2025, it was reported that General Atomics had replaced the crashed drone as per the lease agreement. The crash had occurred due to a power failure and the new drone is operational. The two drones have clocked 18,000 flying hours.

The extension of the lease agreement for the High Altitude Long Endurance (HALE) RPAS was approved by the Defence Acquisition Council (DAC) on 29 December 2025. The ₹1,600 crore (equivalent to ₹17 billion or US$180 million in 2026) project also includes the lease of two additional Sea Guardians which will fill the surveillance gap until the delivery of 31 MQ-9Bs begins. On 17 August, MoD signed a contract with GA-ASI for leasing two additional Sea Guardians for 30 months at a cost of ₹1,943 crore (US$210 million).

===== Order =====
In June 2017, the US State Department approved the sale of 22 drones to India, costing around $2–3 billion. As of February 2020, a deal to purchase 30 drones with 10 drones for each of the three Indian armed services, was expected to be signed by the end of the fiscal year.

In February 2022, it was reported that Indian Navy had shelved the deal and was instead looking at more indigenous options from the DRDO as well as upgrading its current fleet of IAI Heron drones. On 27 February 2022, PTI reported that the procurement for the 30 armed Predator B drones – 10 each for the Indian Army, Indian Navy and Indian Air Force - is in the advanced stage and disputed earlier reports of the deal being put on the back burner with India reportedly providing "good feedback" on the SeaGuardians already on lease.

On 15 June 2023, Reuters reported that the Indian side has approved the purchase of 31 drones worth slightly over $3 billion. The formal announcement of the deal was done during the state visit of Prime Minister Narendra Modi to the US.

The US sent the Letter of Acceptance (LoA) to the Ministry of Defence for a deal of 31 MQ-9Bs (15 for Navy, and 8 each for Army and Air Force). The document will now be forwarded to Cabinet Committee on Security (CCS) for final approval. A US delegation was in India during early June 2024 to negotiate the deal. General Atomics has offered "to provide consultancy to Indian entities" to develop an advanced UAV under Predator deal. General Atomics is also expected to establish a Global MRO facility in India. The assembly of the drones is to be done in India. By value, 30% of the sub components will be sourced from Indian companies though there will be no technology transfer under the agreement. The deal also includes the purchase of 170 AGM-114 Hellfire missiles, 310 GBU-39 glide bombs, navigation systems, sensor suites, mobile ground control systems and future integration of Indian weapon systems like NASM-SR anti-ship missiles.

On 29 July 2024, the Defence Acquisition Council (DAC) approved few unknown amendments to the Acceptance of Necessity (AoN) of the deal. This will be followed by granting of AoN by DAC and final clearance by CCS before signing of the deal. US has put a price tag of $3.9 billion, but price negotiation is on to reduce this value. The deal is expected to be concluded by December 2024 after receiving CCS clearance. The drones will be assembled in India and the first 10 units is to be delivered within few years of signing the deal.

According to reports, the Sarsawa AFS and Gorakhpur AFS air bases are being upgraded for the joint deployment of MQ-9Bs of Indian Army and Indian Air Force. The Indian Navy will deploy these drones from INS Rajali and Porbandar Naval Air Enclave (NAE).

The purchase of 31 MQ-9B drones is reportedly granted Acceptance of Necessity (AoN) by the Defence Acquisition Council (DAC) – headed by the Indian Defence Minister Rajnath Singh – as of mid-September 2024. The final deal signing is scheduled to be completed by the 31 October 2024 deadline. The deal is to be worth ₹32,000 crore (equivalent to ₹340 billion or US$3.6 billion in 2026) and includes an agreement to equip the drones with indigenous weapon system afterwards.

On 9 October 2024, the Cabinet Committee on Security (CCS) cleared the project worth around ₹30,000 crore (equivalent to ₹320 billion or US$3.4 billion in 2026) to purchase 31 MQ-9B UAVs. The first UAV is to be delivered within about four years of contract signing while all 31 UAVs are to be delivered within 6 years.

On 15 October 2024, India signed the deal for ₹28,350 crore (equivalent to ₹300 billion or US$3.2 billion in 2026). The drones are to be built in India with 34% of its component sourced from local companies. A separate contract for the establishment of a depot-level MRO facility at the cost of ₹4,000 crore (equivalent to ₹43 billion or US$460 million in 2026) was also be signed. The facility will provide performance-based logistics (PBL) for 8 years or 1.5 lakh flying hours, whichever is earlier. General Atomics will also provide expertise and consultancy to DRDO to develop similar capable UAVs. Delivery will begin in 2029. On 20 March 2025, a report confirmed that while 10 of the drones would be delivered from General Atomics' facility in San Diego in flyaway condition, the rest of the 21 units is to be assembled in India.

General Atomics might offer the MQ-9B AEW variant to India.

==== Italy ====
On 1 August 2008, Italy submitted a FMS request through the Defense Security Cooperation Agency for four aircraft, four ground stations and five years of maintenance support, all valued at US$330 million. Italy ordered two more aircraft in November 2009. On 30 May 2012, it was reported that the U.S. planned to sell kits to arm Italy's six Reapers with Hellfire missiles and laser-guided bombs. However Gen. Alberto Rosso has expressed frustration at American delays in integrating additional weapons onto the platform and suggested that Italy may have to seek UAS alternatives. Italian Reapers were used:

- In Libya, since 10 August 2011, as part of its contribution to NATO's Operation Unified Protector (flew about 300 hours)
- In Kosovo, since 13 March 2012 inbound NATO KFOR "Joint Enterprise" operation
- On "Mare Nostrum" mission (Mediterranean sea, migrants search and rescue operation) by October 2013
- Into Afghanistan theater by January 2014 (to replace Predator A+)

On 3 November 2015, the U.S. approved a deal covering weapons integration onto Italy's Reaper aircraft, which would make it the first country outside the UK to weaponize the drone. The potential for increased contribution to NATO coalition operations, improved operational flexibility, and enhanced survivability for Italian forces prompted the request.

On 20 November 2019, an Italian Air Force MQ-9 was shot down by a Pantsir system operated by the Libyan National Army or Wagner Group, near the city of Tarhuna, Libya. The Libyan National Army claimed to have shot down the drone that, based on the initial reports, was thought to be a Turkish operated drone, supporting the opposed Government of National Accord. The Italian Defense confirmed the loss stating the cause of the crash is under investigation.

On 15 March 2026, amid the 2026 Iran war, one Italian Air Force MQ-9 was destroyed on the ground by Iranian Ballistic missile and drone attacks at the Ali Al Salem Air Base in Kuwait.

==== Japan ====
On 15 October 2020, General Atomics Aeronautical Systems conducted validation flights of the SeaGuardian UAV for the Japan Coast Guard (JCG). The test flight was conducted at a Japan Maritime Self-Defense Force (JMSDF) air base in Hachinohe. Both the JCG and JMSDF have expressed interest in acquiring SeaGuardian UAVs in order to conduct more ocean surveillance.

On 15 March 2023, the JMSDF will acquire an MQ-9B SeaGuardian for trials as part of its MALE RPAS Trial Operation Project.

==== Morocco ====
After the Israel–Morocco normalization agreement in 2020, the US is to approve the sale of four MQ-9B SeaGuardians to Morocco.

==== Netherlands ====
On 19 June 2013, General Atomics and Fokker Technologies signed a Memorandum of Understanding (MOU) to offer the MQ-9 Reaper to the Dutch government (Second Rutte cabinet) to meet their need for a MALE UAV. The MOU recognizes that Fokker will assist in maintenance and support of the aircraft in the Netherlands if a deal goes through.

On 21 November 2013, the Dutch Minister of Defense announced that the Royal Netherlands Air Force (RNLAF) had selected the MQ-9 Reaper Block-V as its new MALE UAV. The new MALE UAV 306 squadron will be based at Leeuwarden Air Base. In July 2018, the Dutch government signed a Letter of Acceptance for the acquisition through the Foreign Military Sales process.

The Dutch MQ-9 is to have the Synthetic Aperture Radar with the Maritime Search option and also a special ground search radar with more range and electronic sensors to detect ground radar and signals. The RNLAF bought four ground stations (two at Home-base, two at forward operating base) and four MQ-9s Block-V. The aircraft are to reach full operational status in 2023. Four more systems are ordered, along with missiles and bombs.

==== Poland ====
The Polish Ministry of National Defense is currently operating an unspecified number of leased units since February 2023.

On 12 December 2024, Poland signed a deal worth $310 million for three MQ-9B SkyGuardians with deliveries expected to start in 2027.

==== Spain ====
On 6 August 2015, the Spanish Ministry of Defence announced that the First government of Mariano Rajoy had decided to buy four Reaper surveillance aircraft with two ground control stations for €25 million ($27 million) in 2016, costing €171 million over five years. General Atomics will partner with Spanish Company SENER to deliver unarmed versions to Spain, making it the fifth European country to order the Reaper. In addition to selecting the Reaper, Spain is interested in the joint German-French-Italian project to develop a European MALE UAV.

The Defense Department cleared the purchase on 6 October 2015. Spain selected the Reaper over the Heron TP to perform homeland security, counter-insurgency, and counter-terrorism operations. The Spanish government agreed to purchase the system on 30 October. The Reaper was selected over the Heron TP mainly for commonality with NATO allies who also use the airframe. Although Spain's immediate priority is for surveillance, they will eventually try to weaponize the platform. The first two aircraft and first GCS is planned for delivery in 2017, with the third aircraft in 2018 when they achieve Initial operating capability (IOC), and the last in 2020 achieving full operational capability (FOC).

==== Taiwan ====
On 3 November 2020, the US State Department approved the sale of four MQ-9B, along with Control Stations and Embedded Global Positioning System/Inertial Navigations Systems (EGI) with Selective Availability Anti-Spoofing Module (SAASM) to Taiwan.

==== United Arab Emirates ====
On 10 November 2020, the US State Department approved the sale of up to 18 MQ-9Bs to the UAE pending approval by Congress.

==== United Kingdom ====
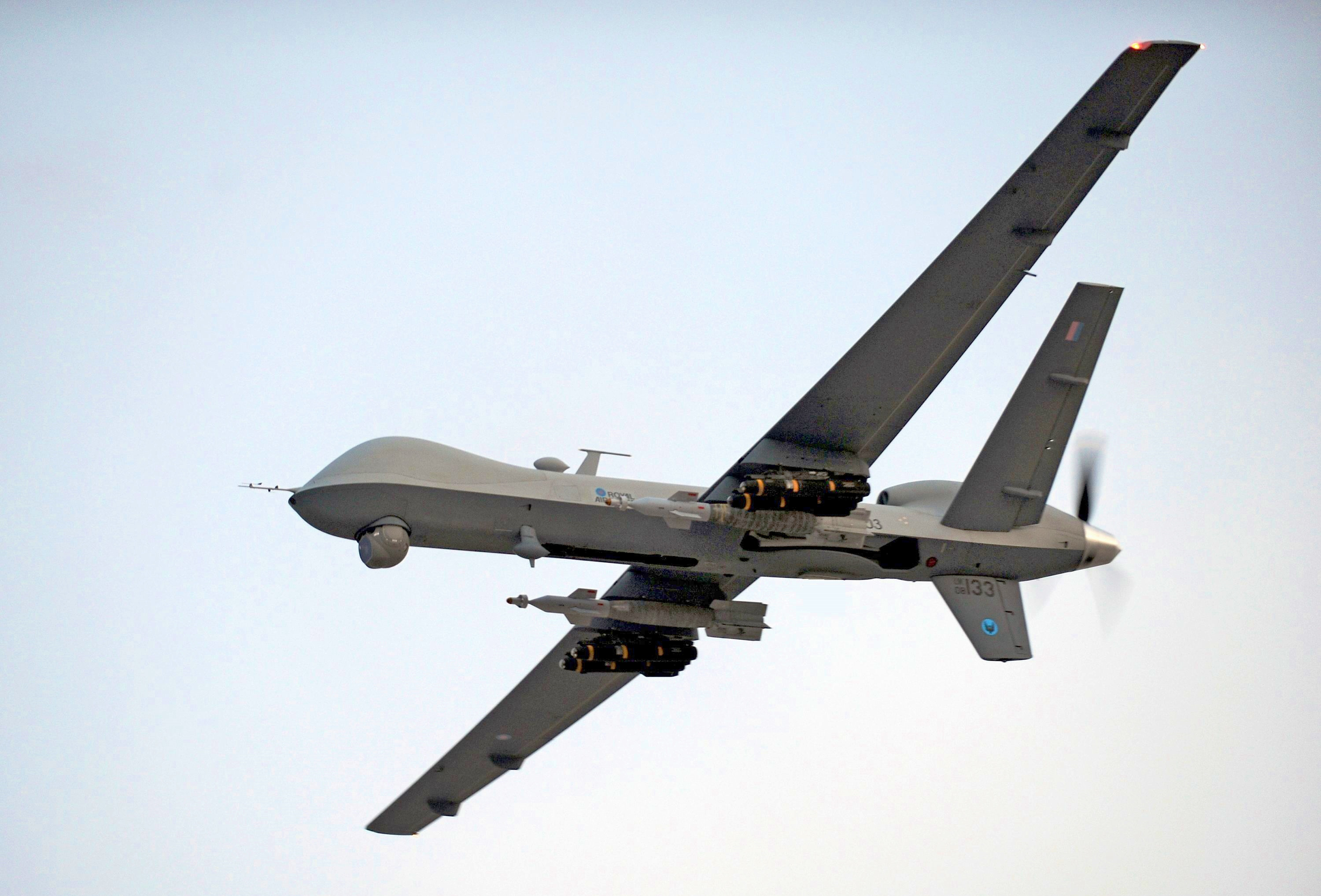
A British MQ-9A Reaper operating over Afghanistan in 2009

On 27 September 2006, the U.S. Congress was notified by the Defense Security Cooperation Agency that the United Kingdom (Brown ministry) was seeking to purchase a pair of MQ-9A Reapers. They were initially operated by No. 39 Squadron from Creech Air Force Base, Nevada, later moving to RAF Waddington. A third MQ-9A was in the process of being purchased by the RAF in 2007. On 9 November 2007, the UK Ministry of Defence (MoD) announced that its Reapers had begun operations in Afghanistan against the Taliban. In April 2008, following the crash of one of the UK's two Reapers, British special forces were sent to recover sensitive material from the wreckage before it was blown up to prevent the enemy from obtaining it. By May 2011, five Reapers were in operation, with a further five on order.

The second RAF squadron to operate five Reapers is No. XIII Squadron, which was formally activated and commissioned on 26 October 2012. No. 39 Squadron personnel were planned to gradually return to the UK in 2013 and in time both squadrons would each operate five Reapers from RAF Waddington. In April 2013, XIII Squadron started full operations from RAF Waddington, exercising control over a complement of 10 Reapers, at that point all based in Afghanistan.

Five Reapers can provide 36 hours of combined surveillance coverage in Afghanistan with individual sorties lasting up to 16 hours. A further five vehicles increased this to 72 hours. In total, RAF Reapers flew 71,000 flight hours in Afghanistan, and dropped 510 guided weapons (compared to 497 for Harrier and Tornado).

In April 2013, it was revealed that the MoD was studying the adoption of MBDA's Brimstone missile for the MQ-9. In December 2013, several successful test firings of the Brimstone missile from a Reaper at Naval Air Weapons Station China Lake were completed to support integration with RAF Reapers. Nine missiles were fired at an altitude of 20,000 ft, at distances of 7 to 12 km (4.3 to 7.5 mi) from the targets; all nine scored direct hits against static, accelerating, weaving, and fast remotely controlled targets.

In 2014, the MoD decided that its Reaper fleet will be brought into the RAF's core fleet once operations over Afghanistan cease. Procurement of the MQ-9A was via an urgent operational capability requirement and funded from the Treasury reserve, but induction into the core fleet will have them funded from the MoD's budget. The Reapers were retained for contingent purposes, mainly to perform intelligence, surveillance and reconnaissance (ISR), until its replacement enters service around 2018. On 4 October 2015 David Cameron announced that the RAF would replace its existing fleet of 10 Reapers with more than 20 of the "latest generation of RPAS", named as "Protector",

On 16 October 2014, the MoD announced the deployment of armed Reapers in Operation Shader, the UK's contribution to the United States-led military intervention against Islamic State, the first occasion the UK had used its Reapers outside Afghanistan. The number of aircraft from the RAF's 10-strong fleet was not disclosed, but it was expected that at least two were sent; more were dispatched as the UK drew down from Afghanistan. The RAF Reapers' primary purpose is to provide surveillance support and situational awareness to coalition forces. On 10 November 2014, the MoD reported that an RAF Reaper had conducted its first airstrike against Islamic State forces, firing a Hellfire missile at militants placing an IED near Bayji.

RAF Reapers based at RAF Akrotiri in Cyprus conducted a single surveillance mission over Syria in November 2014, four in December 2014, and eight in January 2015. On 7 September 2015, Prime Minister David Cameron announced that two Islamic State fighters from Britain had been killed in an intelligence-led strike by an RAF Reaper near Raqqa, Syria, the first armed use of RAF assets in Syria during the civil war. By January 2016, RAF Reapers had flown 1,000 sorties in support of Operation Shader. Compared to operations in Afghanistan, where RAF Reapers fired 16 Hellfire missiles in 2008, 93 in 2013, and 94 in 2014, in operations against ISIL, 258 Hellfires were fired in 2015.

In September 2025, the Reaper was retired from RAF service and replaced by Protector.

===== Protector =====
In April 2016, the United Kingdom announced that it intended to place an order for the Certifiable Predator B (MQ-9B) as part of its Protector MALE UAV program for the Royal Air Force. According to the 2015 Strategic Defence and Security Review, the Royal Air Force was to operate at least 20 Protector systems by 2025, replacing all of the ten MQ-9A Reapers. The order was subsequently limited to 16 systems. In RAF service the aircraft would be designated as the Protector RG Mk 1 with aircraft to be acquired from 2018 to 2030 with the first delivery scheduled in 2023.

On 15 July 2018, a GA-ASI Company-owned MQ-9B SkyGuardian was flown from the United States to RAF Fairford in the UK for the first transatlantic flight of a MALE UAV. It was displayed at the Royal International Air Tattoo (RIAT) air show, where the aircraft was given markings of No. 31 Squadron. This followed an announcement by the RAF's Chief of Air Staff that No. 31 Squadron would be the first RAF Squadron to operate a similar version of the MQ-9B aircraft, to be known as the Protector RG Mark 1 (RG1), starting in 2023. The squadron reformed at RAF Waddington in October 2023. In July 2020, the Ministry of Defence signed a contract for three Protector UAVs with an option on an additional thirteen aircraft. It was announced in September 2021 that No. XIII Squadron will become the second Protector squadron. RAF Waddington will also host an MQ-9B training school for both RAF and international operators as part of a larger investment into the base to facilitate MQ-9B operations.

Protector will be able to carry up to 18 Brimstone 3 missiles or Paveway IV bombs. The first of 16 Protector UAVs was delivered on 30 September 2023 with initial operating capability expected in 2025 and full operating capability expected from 2026. The 2025 UK defence review posited that Protector drones might add a maritime surveillance role to their capabilities by modifying the aircraft to incorporate additional pod-mounted radar systems.

In October 2025, two Protector UAVs were reported deployed at RAF Akrotiri located in the British Sovereign Base Areas in Cyprus.

===== Mojave =====
In May 2023, the UK announced it would be acquiring a carrier-based variant of the MQ-9, the General Atomics Mojave, for seven months of trials aboard its Queen Elizabeth-class aircraft carriers.

== Variants ==
=== MQ-9 ===
==== Mariner ====
A navalized Reaper, named Mariner, was proposed for the U.S. Navy's Broad Area Maritime Surveillance (BAMS) program. It had an increased fuel capacity for an endurance of up to 49 hours. Variations included one for aircraft carrier operations with folding wings for storage, shortened, reinforced landing gear, an arresting hook, cut-down or eliminated ventral flight surfaces and six stores pylons for a total load of 3,000 pounds (1,360 kilograms). The Northrop Grumman RQ-4N was selected as the BAMS winner.

==== Guardian ====
US Customs and Border Protection (CBP) operates two maritime variants of the MQ-9, known as Guardians. The U.S. Coast Guard evaluated the Guardian, including performing joint operations with CBP. CBP and the Coast Guard operate one MQ-9 Guardian jointly out of land-based stations in Florida and Texas.

==== MQ-9 Block 5 ====
On 24 May 2012, General Atomics conducted the successful first flight of its upgraded MQ-9 Block 1-plus Reaper. The Block 1-plus version was designed for increased electrical power, secure communications, automatic landing, increased gross takeoff weight (GTOW), weapons growth, and streamlined payload integration capabilities. A new high-capacity starter generator offers increased electrical power capacity to provide growth capacity; a backup generator is also present and is sufficient for all flight-critical functions, improving the electrical power system's reliability via three independent power sources.

New communications capabilities, including dual ARC-210 VHF/UHF radios with wingtip antennas, allow for simultaneous communications between multiple air-to-air and air-to-ground parties, secure data links, and an increased data transmission capacity. The new trailing arm main landing gear allows the carriage of heavier payloads or additional fuel. Development and testing were completed, and Milestone C was achieved in September 2012. Follow-on aircraft will be redesignated MQ-9 Block 5. On 15 October 2013, the USAF awarded General Atomics a $377.4 million contract for 24 MQ-9 Block 5 Reapers. The MQ-9 Block 5 flew its first combat mission on 23 June 2017.

=== Mojave ===
A development of the General Atomics MQ-1C Gray Eagle incorporating some technologies from the MQ-9 family to facilitate Short take-off and landing operations from both austere and naval environments.

=== MQ-9B (Certifiable Predator B) ===
==== SkyGuardian ====
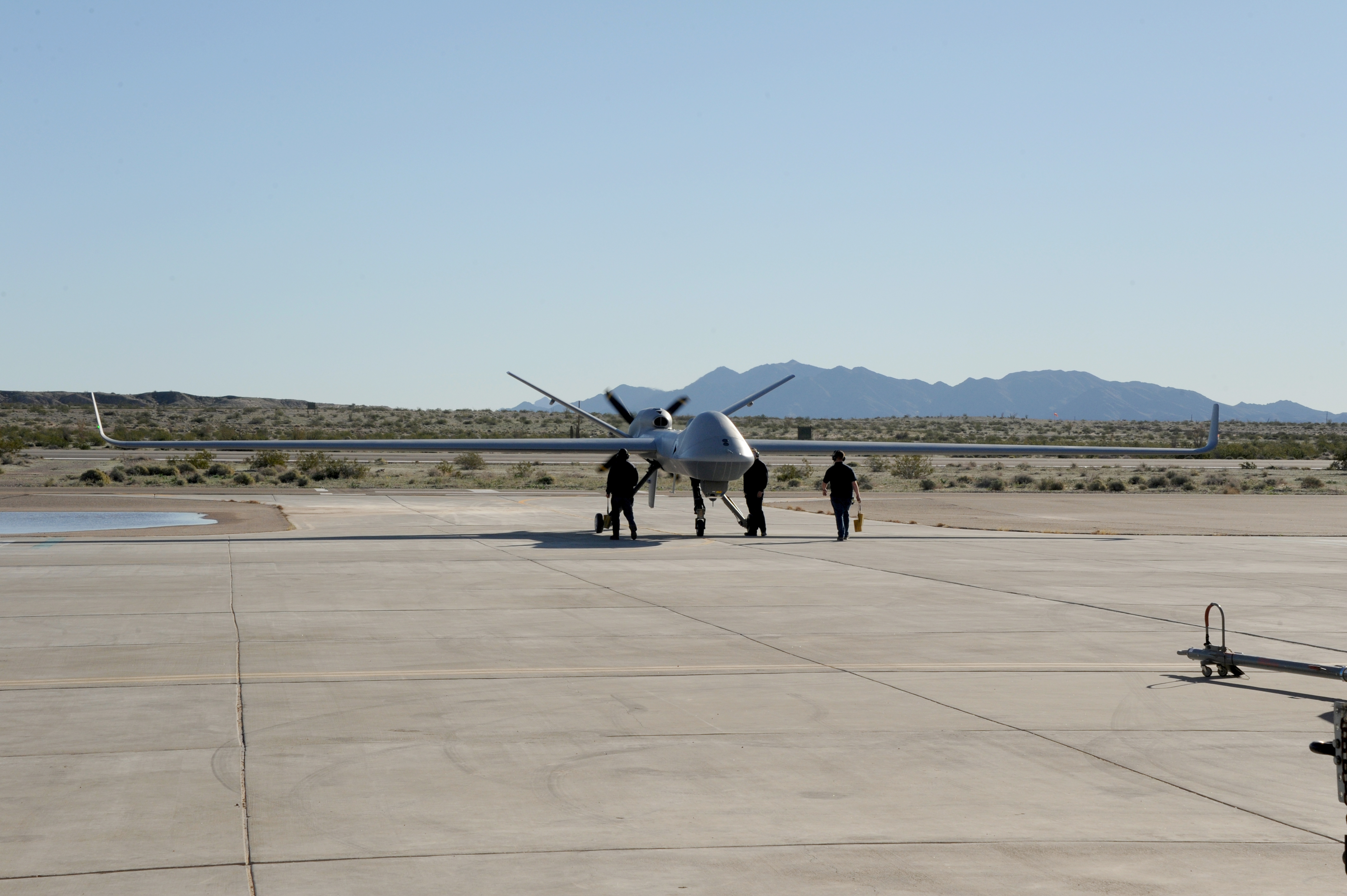
The SkyGuardian at Laguna Army Airfield for testing and certification, including a 48.2-hour endurance record and first FAA certification of an unmanned aircraft to fly in civilian air space.

International demand for a MALE RPAS capable of being certified for operation within civilian airspace drove General Atomics to develop a version of the platform known by GA-ASI as MQ-9B SkyGuardian, previously called Certifiable Predator B, to make it compliant with European flight regulations to obtain more sales in European countries. In order to fly over national airspace, the aircraft meets NATO STANAG 4671 airworthiness requirements with lightning protection, different composite materials, and sense and avoid technology.

The MQ-9Bs performance changes include a 79 ft (24 m) wingspan that has winglets and enough fuel for a 40-hour endurance at 50,000 ft (15,000 m). Features include High Definition EO/IR Full Motion Video sensor, De/Anti-Icing System, TCAS, and Automatic Take-Off & Land. The system also includes a completely redesigned & modernized integrated ground control station with 4 crew stations. The version adopted by the Royal Air Force has the designation "Protector RG Mk1".

==== SeaGuardian ====
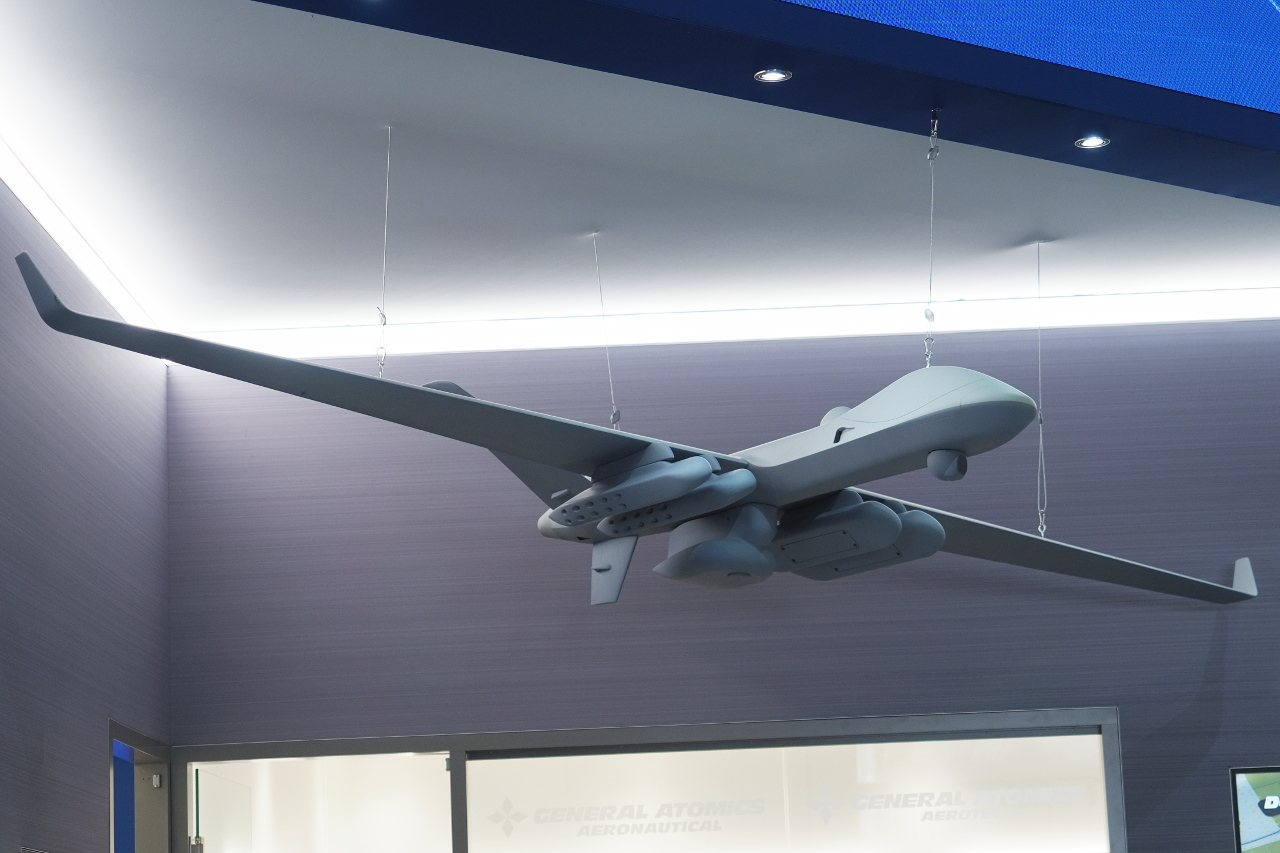
MQ-9B SeaGuardian

General Atomics continued with the development of a Naval Reaper concept, eventually culminating in a variant of the MQ-9B known as the SeaGuardian. It has an endurance of more than 18 hours and can mount an eight-hour patrol at a radius of 1,200 nmi (1,400 mi; 2,200 km). A key part of its mission set is the Leonardo Seaspray 7500E V2 AESA radar mounted as a centerline pod with inverse synthetic aperture radar that can spot surface targets including ships, submarine periscopes, and people during search and rescue operations. The SeaGuardian can be fitted with Multimode 360 Maritime Surface Search Radar and automatic identification system (AIS).

General Atomics studied testing a sonobuoy launch capability from the Guardian in 2016 to demonstrate its ability to carry them, control them, and send information back to the ground station over a SATCOM link. In November 2020, a company-owned Reaper carried out a trial releasing sonobuoys, then processing information from them to track a training target. This led to the creation of an anti-submarine warfare package for the SeaGuardian, the first self-contained ASW package for a UAS. The package comprises podded sonobuoy dispenser systems (SDS), using a pneumatic launch system to launch ten A-size or twenty G-size buoys from each pod, and a sonobuoy management and control system (SMCS); the aircraft can carry up to four pods.

==== MQ-9B STOL ====
In May 2022, at the Indo Pacific International Maritime Exposition, General Atomics unveiled their concept for a short-take-off-and-landing kit capable of being applied to any MQ-9B aircraft. This kit would replace the wings, tail and propeller with STOL optimised equivalents developed from the company's Mojave RPA, allowing for use from austere environments and particularly aircraft carriers, notably Landing helicopter docks (LHDs) and landing helicopter assault ships (LHAs).

=== Reaper ER ===
The Reaper ER is an extended range version of the MQ-9 reaper drone. The Reaper ER can fly for 34 hours which is 7 more hours than the regular MQ-9. The Reaper ER has external fuel tanks and reinforced landing gear to support the weight. The Reaper ER costs $56.5 million each and has a range 1,611 miles. The ER uses a combination of AGM-114 Hellfire missiles, GBU-12 Paveway II, GBU-38 Joint Direct Attack Munitions, GBU-49 Enhanced Paveway II, and GBU-54 Laser Joint Direct Attack Munitions.

=== MQ-9A ===
The MQ-9A is a variant of the MQ-9 Reaper family. It can fly for 27 hours and is a multi-mission drone.

=== MQ-9A Block 5 ===
MQ-9A Block 5 has the latest version of the GA-ASI Lynx AN/APY-8 Block 20A synthetic aperture radar (SAR) with maritime wide area surveillance (MWAS) capability. It has a payload capacity of 2,087 kg which includes 1,701 kg of external stores. MQ-9A Block 5 has higher electrical power generation, auto take-off and landing capability with improved landing gear and datalinks. It has endurance up to 26 hours and can operate up to 45,000 feet.

== Operators ==
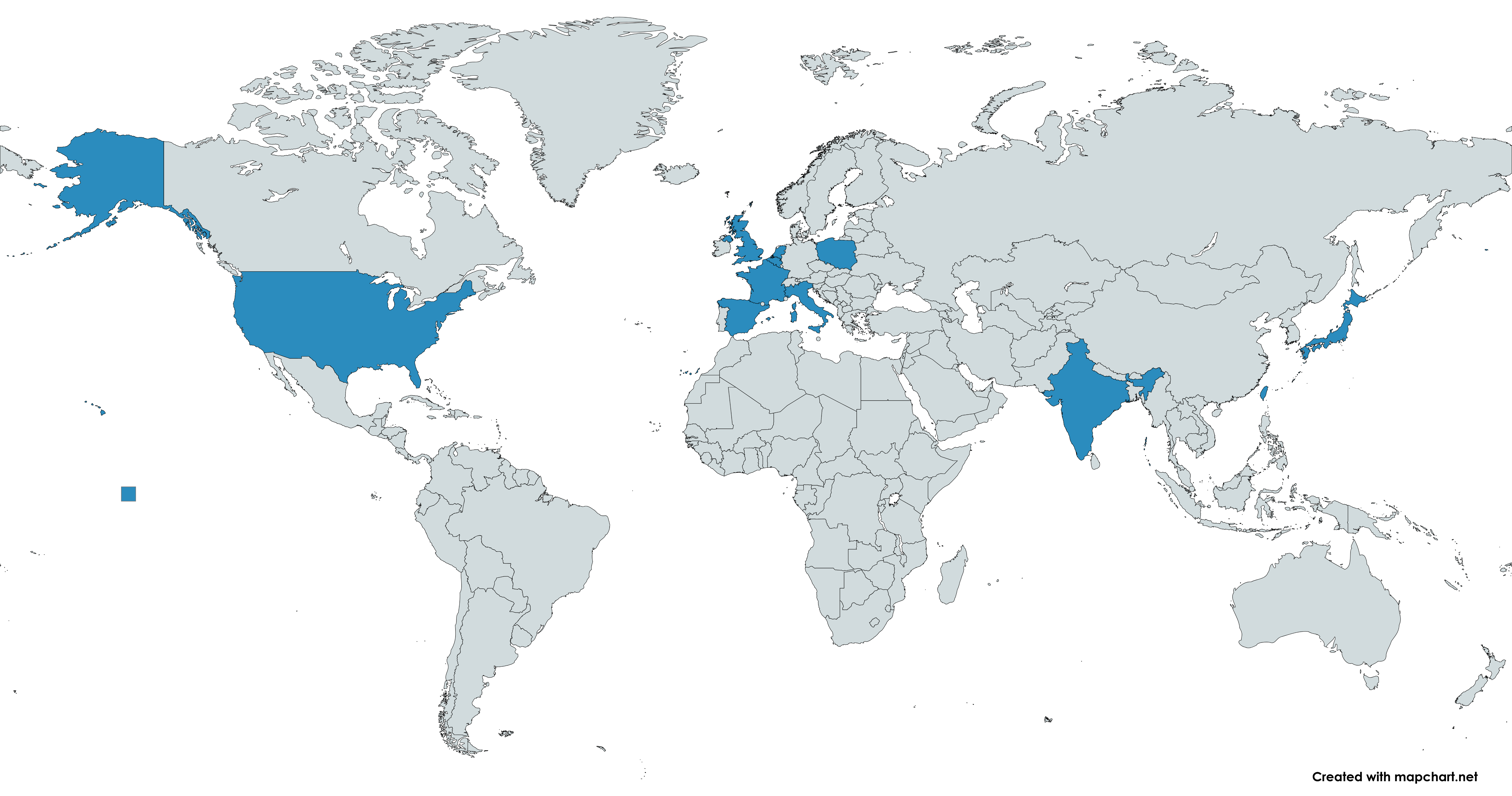
Map of MQ9B Operators Worldwide

Belgium

- Belgian Air Force – 4 MQ-9B SkyGuardians ordered. First system delivered in summer of 2025.

Canada

- Royal Canadian Air Force – 11 MQ-9B on order with delivery beginning in 2028.

Denmark

- Royal Danish Air Force – 4 MQ-9B SeaGuardians ordered for surveillance in the Arctic and North Atlantic region. They are to be delivered by 2028–2029.

France

- French Air and Space Force – 12 MQ-9A ERs operational since 2014.
  - Cognac – Châteaubernard Air Base, Charente
    - 33rd Attack, Reconnaissance and Surveillance Wing

India

- Indian Army – 8 on order
- Indian Air Force – 8 on order
- Indian Navy – 2 on lease since Nov. 2020, 2 further to be leased with 15 more on order.
  - INS Rajali, Tamil Nadu

Italy

- Italian Air Force – 4 MQ-9As operational 2 MQ-9A Block 5 acquired, 4 Block 5 on order, including a ground control station. Delivery to be completed by the end of 2027. Current 4 are also being upgraded to Block 5.
  - Amendola Air Base, province of Foggia
    - 32° Stormo
      - 28° Gruppo
  - Naval Air Station Sigonella, Sicily
    - 32° Stormo
      - 61° Gruppo Volo

Japan

- Japan Coast Guard – 3 SeaGuardians in operational use since October 2022.

Netherlands

- Royal Netherlands Air and Space Force – 8 MQ-9As operational
  - Leeuwarden Air Base
    - No. 306 Squadron

Poland

- Polish Air Force – unspecified number of MQ-9As in service since Feb. 2023, and 3 MQ-9B SkyGuardian on order.

Spain

- Spanish Air and Space Force– 4 MQ-9As operational
  - Talavera la Real Air Base, Extremadura
    - ALA 23
      - 233 Escuadrón

Taiwan

- Republic of China Air Force – 4 MQ-9B SkyGuardian ordered, with 2 received in March 2026, and 2 to be delivered in 2027.

United Kingdom

- Royal Air Force – Reaper retired in September 2025 and replaced by Protector. 16 Protector UAVs ordered for delivery starting in 2023 replacing Reaper. 11 of 16 Protectors delivered and in service as of October 2026 with the other 5 remaining in test and evaluation with the manufacturer.
  - RAF Waddington, Lincolnshire
    - No. XIII Squadron
    - No. 31 Squadron (forming on Protector UAV from 2023)
    - No. 54 Squadron (Operational Conversion Unit; converting to Protector UAV from 2023/24)
    - No. 56 Squadron (Test and Evaluation Squadron Protector UAV from 2023)
  - Former: Creech Air Force Base, Nevada
    - No. 39 Squadron (2007–2022)

United States

- United States Air Force
  - Air Combat Command
    - 49th Wing (Holloman Air Force Base, New Mexico)
      - 6th Attack Squadron
      - 16th Training Squadron
      - 9th Attack Squadron
      - 29th Attack Squadron
    - 53rd Wing (Eglin Air Force Base, Florida)
      - 556th Test and Evaluation Squadron (Creech Air Force Base, Nevada)
    - 432nd Wing (Creech Air Force Base, Nevada)
      - 11th Attack Squadron
      - 15th Attack Squadron
      - 20th Attack Squadron (Whiteman Air Force Base, Missouri)
      - 22d Attack Squadron
      - 50th Attack Squadron (Shaw Air Force Base, South Carolina)
      - 89th Attack Squadron (Ellsworth Air Force Base, South Dakota)
      - 482nd Attack Squadron (Shaw Air Force Base, South Carolina)
      - 489th Attack Squadron
  - United States Air Forces in Europe – Air Forces Africa
    - 31st Operations Group
      - 731st Expeditionary Attack Squadron (71st Air Base, Romania)
    - 52d Expeditionary Operations Group
      - 717th Expeditionary Attack Squadron (12th Air Base, Poland)
  - Air Force Special Operations Command
    - 27th Special Operations Wing (Cannon Air Force Base, New Mexico)
      - 33rd Special Operations Squadron
    - 58th Special Operations Wing (Kirtland Air Force Base, New Mexico)
      - 551st Special Operations Squadron
  - Air National Guard
    - 107th Attack Wing (Niagara Falls Air Force Base, New York)
      - 136th Attack Squadron
    - 110th Wing (Battle Creek Air National Guard Base, Michigan)
      - 172nd Attack Squadron
    - 111th Attack Wing (Biddle Air National Guard Base, Pennsylvania)
      - 103rd Attack Squadron
    - 118th Wing (Berry Field, Nashville, Tennessee)
      - 105th Attack Squadron
    - 119th Wing (Fargo Air National Guard Base, North Dakota)
      - 178th Attack Squadron
    - 132nd Wing (Des Moines Air National Guard Base, Iowa)
      - 124th Attack Squadron
    - 147th Attack Wing (Ellington Field Joint Reserve Base, Texas)
      - 111th Attack Squadron
    - 163rd Attack Wing (March Air Reserve Base, Riverside, California)
      - 160th Attack Squadron
      - 196th Attack Squadron
    - 174th Attack Wing (Hancock Field Air National Guard Base, New York)
      - 138th Attack Squadron
    - 178th Wing (Springfield-Beckley Air National Guard Station, Ohio)
      - 162d Attack Squadron
    - 188th Wing (Ebbing Air National Guard Station, Arkansas)
      - 184th Attack Squadron
  - Air Force Reserve Command
    - 919th Special Operations Wing (Duke Field, Florida)
      - 2d Special Operations Squadron
- United States Marine Corps
  - VMU-1 (Marine Corps Air Station Yuma, Arizona)
  - VMU-3 (Marine Corps Air Station Kaneohe Bay, Hawaii)
  - VMUT-2 (Marine Corps Air Station Cherry Point, North Carolina)
- U.S. Customs and Border Protection
  - Sierra Vista, Arizona
  - Grand Forks Air Force Base, North Dakota
  - Cape Canaveral Air Force Station, Florida
  - Naval Air Station Corpus Christi, Texas

=== Potential Operators ===
==== Colombia ====
Following the first visit of Colombian Defense Minister Jorge Eduardo Mora to Washington D.C., in August 2026, it was announced that the Colombian Armed Forces would receive three MQ-9s in loan and the potential of a purchase for a fourth unit.

==== Finland ====
In Autumn 2021, Finnish Defence Forces took part in test flights with the MQ-9.

==== Greece ====
The Hellenic Air Force is in discussions for the acquisition of at least three MQ-9 SeaGuardians.

=== Cancelled acquisitions ===
==== Australia ====
In September 2006, the General Atomics Mariner demonstrator aircraft was operated by the Australian Defence Science and Technology Group (DSTO) in an exercise designed to evaluate the aircraft's ability to aid in efforts to stem illegal fishing, drug running and illegal immigration. The Mariner operated from Royal Australian Air Force bases Edinburgh, South Australia and Learmonth, Western Australia in conjunction with a Royal Australian Navy Armidale class patrol boat, the Joint Offshore Protection Command, and the Pilbara Regiment.

In February 2015, it was announced that six RAAF personnel had been sent to Holloman AFB, New Mexico and Creech AFB, Nevada to undergo training.

In August 2015, it was revealed that Australians had begun flying MQ-9s over Syria, the first time Australia expanded operations past Iraq during the Military intervention against the Islamic State of Iraq and the Levant. Five RAAF personnel were embedded with the USAF 432nd Operations Group, which flies armed Reapers, performing operational duties with the unit as MQ-9 system pilots and sensor operators.

In November 2018, the Defence Minister Christopher Pyne announced that Australia would purchase 12 to 16 MQ-9s. In November 2019, Australia announced the selection of the MQ-9B for its armed Medium-Altitude Long-Endurance (MALE) RPAS requirement under Project Air 7003.

In April 2021, the State Department approved a possible Foreign Military Sale to the Government of Australia of 12 MQ-9B Reapers and related equipment for an estimated cost of $1.651 billion (~$1.93 billion in 2025).

== Specifications ==
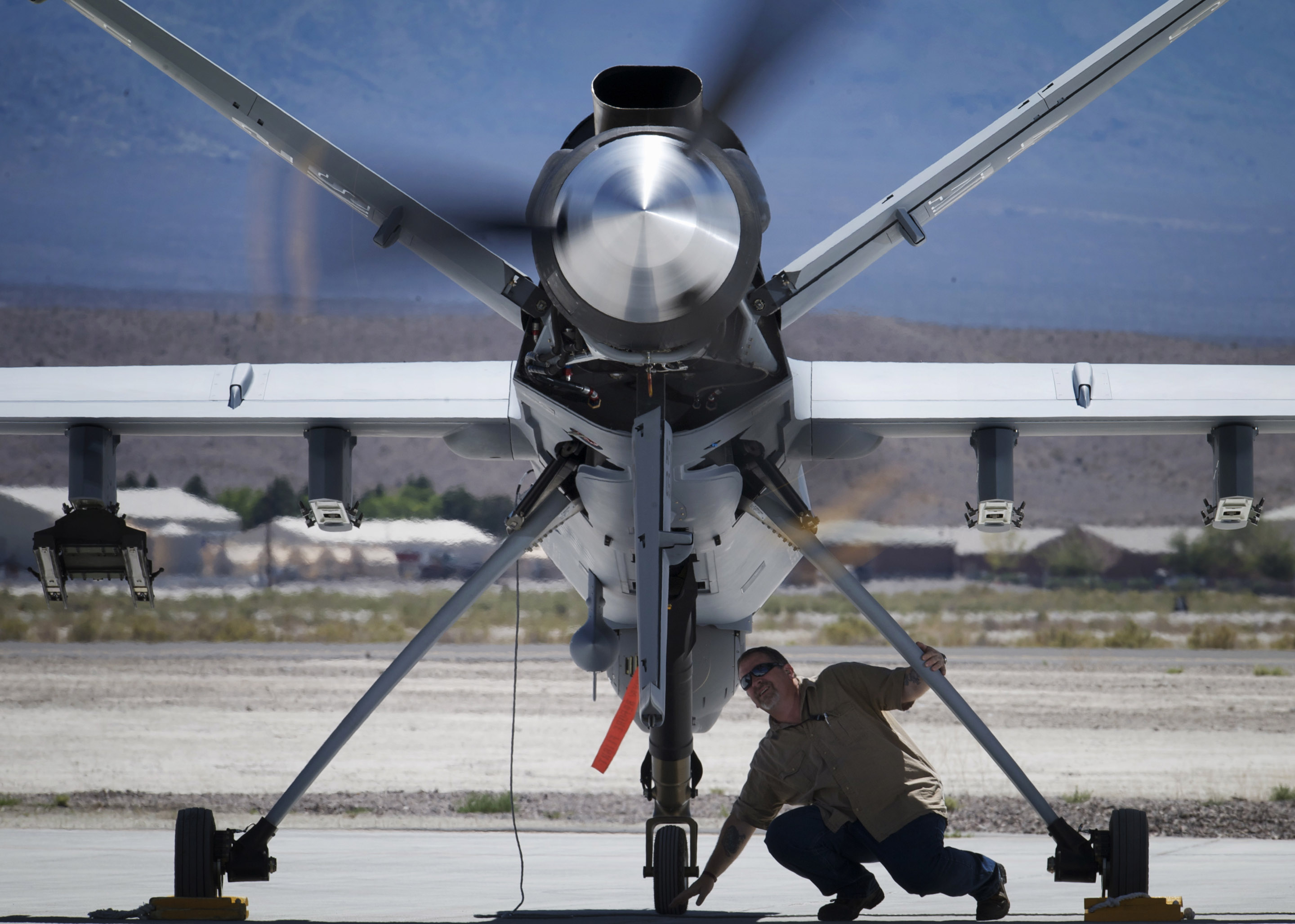
Honeywell turboprop

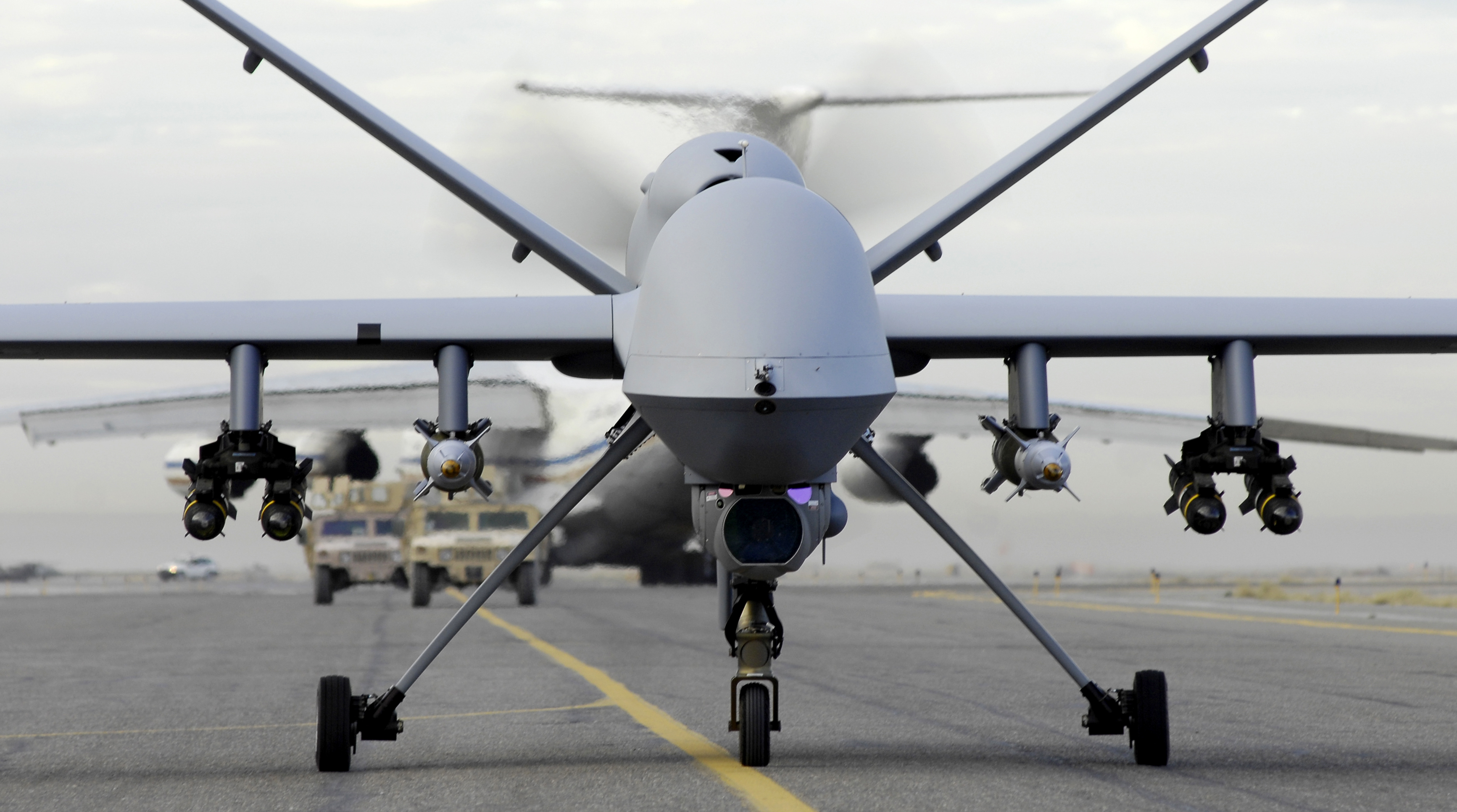
MQ-9 Reaper taxiing

=== MQ-9A Reaper ===
Data from USAF Fact Sheet

General characteristics

- Crew: 0 onboard, 2 in ground station
- Length: 36 ft 1 in (11 m)
- Wingspan: 65 ft 7 in (20 m)
- Height: 12 ft 6 in (3.81 m)
- Empty weight: 4,901 lb (2,223 kg)
- Max takeoff weight: 10,494 lb (4,760 kg)
- Fuel capacity: 4,000 lb (1,800 kg)
- Payload: 3,800 lb (1,700 kg)
  - Internal: 800 lb (360 kg)
  - External: 3,000 lb (1,400 kg)
- Powerplant: 1 × Honeywell TPE331-10 turboprop, 900 hp (671 kW) with Digital Electronic Engine Control (DEEC)

Performance

- Maximum speed: 300 mph (482 km/h, 260 kn)
- Cruise speed: 194 mph (313 km/h, 169 kn)
- Range: 1,200 mi (1,900 km, 1,000 nmi)
- Endurance: 27 hr
- Service ceiling: 50,000 ft (15,420 m)
- Operational altitude: 25,000 ft (7.5 km)

Armament

- 7 hardpoints
  - Up to 1,500 lb (680 kg) on the two inboard weapons stations
  - Up to 750 lb (340 kg) on the two middle stations
  - Up to 150 lb (68 kg) on the outboard stations
  - Center station not used
- Up to 8 AGM-114 Hellfire air-to-ground missiles can be carried, or four Hellfire missiles and two 500 lb (230 kg) GBU-12 Paveway II laser-guided bombs. The 500 lb (230 kg) GBU-38 Joint Direct Attack Munition (JDAM) can also be carried. In March 2014, MBDA successfully test fired a dual-mode Brimstone missile from a Reaper aircraft on behalf of the UK Ministry of Defence and Royal Air Force. Depending on mission requirements, the MQ-9 Reaper can carry multiple AIM-9X Sidewinder Block II missiles. In late 2025, MQ-9A Reapers operated by the United States Air Force were observed flying operational missions with unusually heavy Hellfire missile loads, carrying between six and ten AGM-114 missiles using multi-rail launchers, representing some of the heaviest publicly documented weapon configurations for the platform to date.

Avionics

- AN/DAS-1 MTS-B Multi-Spectral Targeting System
- AN/APY-8 Lynx II radar
- Raytheon SeaVue Marine Search Radar (Guardian variants)

=== MQ-9B Skyguardian ===
Data from General Atomics Catalog

General characteristics

- Crew: 0 onboard, 2 in ground station
- Length: 38 ft 5 in (11.7 m)
- Wingspan: 78 ft 9 in (24 m)
- Max takeoff weight: 12,500 lb (5,670 kg)
- Fuel capacity: 6,000 lb (2,721 kg)
- Payload: 5,550 lb (2,520 kg)
  - Internal: 800 lb (360 kg)
  - External: 4,750 lb (2,150 kg)
- Powerplant: 1 × Honeywell TPE331-10 turboprop, 900 hp (671 kW) with Digital Electronic Engine Control (DEEC)

Performance

- Maximum speed: 240 mph (390 km/h, 210 kn)
- Range: 6,900 mi (11,000 km, 6,000 nmi)
- Endurance: Over 40 hours
- Service ceiling: 40,000 ft (12,200 m)
- Operational altitude:

Armament

- 9 hardpoints
  - 1 centreline hardpoint
  - 8 wing hardpoints
- Up to ten air to ground Brimstone missile can be carried or 500 lb (230 kg) Paveway IV laser-guided bombs.

Avionics

- AN/DAS-1 MTS-B Multi-Spectral Targeting System
- AN/APY-8 Lynx II radar
- Optional mission kits
  - Multi-mode 360° maritime surface search radar
  - Automatic Identification System (AIS)
  - Anti-Submarine Warfare (ASW)
  - Tactical and strategic SIGINT
  - Tactical data link (Link-16)
  - Airborne Early Warning (AEW)
  - Communications gateway / relay

== See also ==
- Drone strikes in Pakistan (during the 2000s war on terror)—usually attributed to either the MQ-1 or MQ-9
- Dzyne ULTRA
- Measurement and signature intelligence

Related development

- General Atomics MQ-20 Avenger (formerly Predator C)
- General Atomics MQ-1 Predator
- General Atomics MQ-1C Gray Eagle
- General Atomics Mojave

Aircraft of comparable role, configuration, and era

- Elbit Hermes 900
- BAE Systems Mantis
- Baykar Bayraktar Akinci
- GIDS Shahpar-III
- IAI Eitan
- CAIG Wing Loong II
- Shahed 149 Gaza

Related lists

- List of active United States military aircraft
- List of unmanned aerial vehicles
