= VMU-3 =

Marine Unmanned Aerial Vehicle Squadron 3
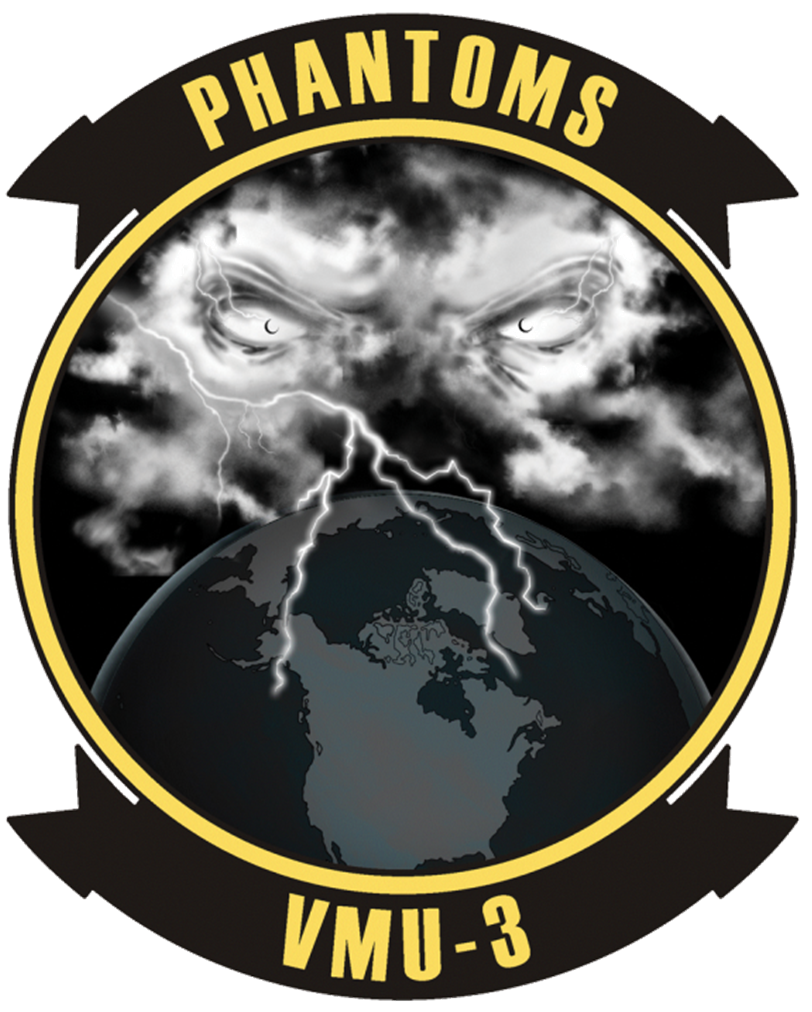
- VMU-3 insignia
- Active: 12 Sep 2008 - present
- Country: United States
- Branch: USMC
- Type: Aerial reconnaissance
- Size: 200+
- Garrison/HQ: Marine Corps Air Station Kaneohe Bay
- Nickname: Phantoms

Commanders
- Commanding Officer: LtCol Edgardo B. Cardona

Marine Unmanned Aerial Vehicle Squadron 3 is an unmanned aerial vehicle (UAV) squadron in the United States Marine Corps that operates the MQ-9A Reaper that consists of approximately 200 Marines. They are based out of Marine Corps Base Hawaii, Kaneohe Bay, Hawaii and its primary mission is to provide aerial surveillance for the III Marine Expeditionary Force. The unit also (in conjunction with VMU-1, based at Twentynine Palms) provides Reconnaissance, Surveillance, and Target Acquisition (RSTA) to units participating in Mojave Viper, an exercise held several times a year in 29 Palms, CA. The squadron, nicknamed the Phantoms, was activated on 12 September 2008 and falls under the command of Marine Aircraft Group 24 and the 1st Marine Aircraft Wing .

VMU-3 is the third UAV unit in the Marine Corps established to provide reconnaissance and assist with deployments and training of ground units. A third of the UAV Operators from VMU-1 and VMU-2 were reassigned to VMU-3 to provide the foundation for the new squadron. In late September 2008, VMU-3 successfully flew the Shadow 200 UAV for the first time, and continues to fly missions in support of 1st Marine Aircraft Wing, III Marine Expeditionary Force, and the Tactical Training Exercise Control Group (TTECG) on a regular basis.

VMU-3 was awarded the 2011 Commandant's Aviation Trophy for outstanding performance of a Marine aviation squadron.

== Mission ==
Support the MAGTF commander by conducting multi-sensor reconnaissance and surveillance and facilitating the destruction of targets from unmanned aerial platforms during expeditionary, joint, and combined operations.

== History ==
VMU-3 Marines load a RQ-7B Shadow onto a launcher at Camp Dwyer, Afghanistan, June 2011

Marine Unmanned Vehicle Squadron 3 was commissioned on 12 September 2008 at Marine Corps Air Ground Combat Center Twentynine Palms, California. At the time, the squadron fell under the command of Marine Air Control Group 38 and the 3rd Marine Aircraft Wing. The squadron's first flight was flown by a RQ-7 Shadow on 22 September 2008. During 2008 and 2009 the squadron supported numerous exercises throughout the Southwestern United States to include Steel Knight, Mojave Viper and Weapons and Tactics Instructor Course at Marine Corps Air Station Yuma, Arizona.

In January 2010, VMU-3 embarked on its first real world deployments sending detachments to support combat operations in both Iraq and Afghanistan. The squadron was part of the International Security Assistance Force and fell directly under Marine Aircraft Group 40, 2nd Marine Expeditionary Brigade. During this time VMU-3, flying both the RQ-7 Shadow and the ScanEagle, notably supported the seizure of Marjeh in Afghanistan. For its outstanding effort supporting combat operations oversea the squadron was awarded the Commandant's Aviation Trophy for outstanding performance by a Marine squadron.

VMU-3 MQ-9A Reaper at Kunsan Air Base, South Korea in 2025

In April 2011, VMU-3 deployed in support of OEF 11.1 - 11.2 in support of multiple infantry companies. It was also the first integration of a laser designator onto the RQ-7B allowing VMU-3 to mark targets to be eliminated in support of the ground operations. VMU-3 returned home 11 November 2011 having flown more hours and laser designating multiple targets than any VMU to date.

The squadron again deployed to Afghanistan from October 2012 through May 2013. With detachments at numerous locations throughout Helmand Province, VMU-3 flew more than 2300 sorties encompassing more than 21,000 flight hours. During this deployment the squadron was also responsible for flying the Kaman K-MAX, an unmanned cargo resupply helicopter.

In 2014, the squadron was relocated to Marine Corps Air Station Kaneohe Bay, Hawaii where it now falls under the command of Marine Aircraft Group 24 and the 1st Marine Aircraft Wing. The squadron now flies the MQ-9A Reaper.

== See also ==
- United States Marine Corps Aviation
- Organization of the United States Marine Corps
- List of active United States Marine Corps aircraft squadrons
- History of unmanned aerial vehicles
- Command Philosophy
