= Marine Corps Air Station Kaneohe Bay =

US Marine Corps base in Hawaii

- Marion E. Carl Field
- Part of Marine Corps Base Hawaii
- Near Kaneohe, Hawaii in the United States
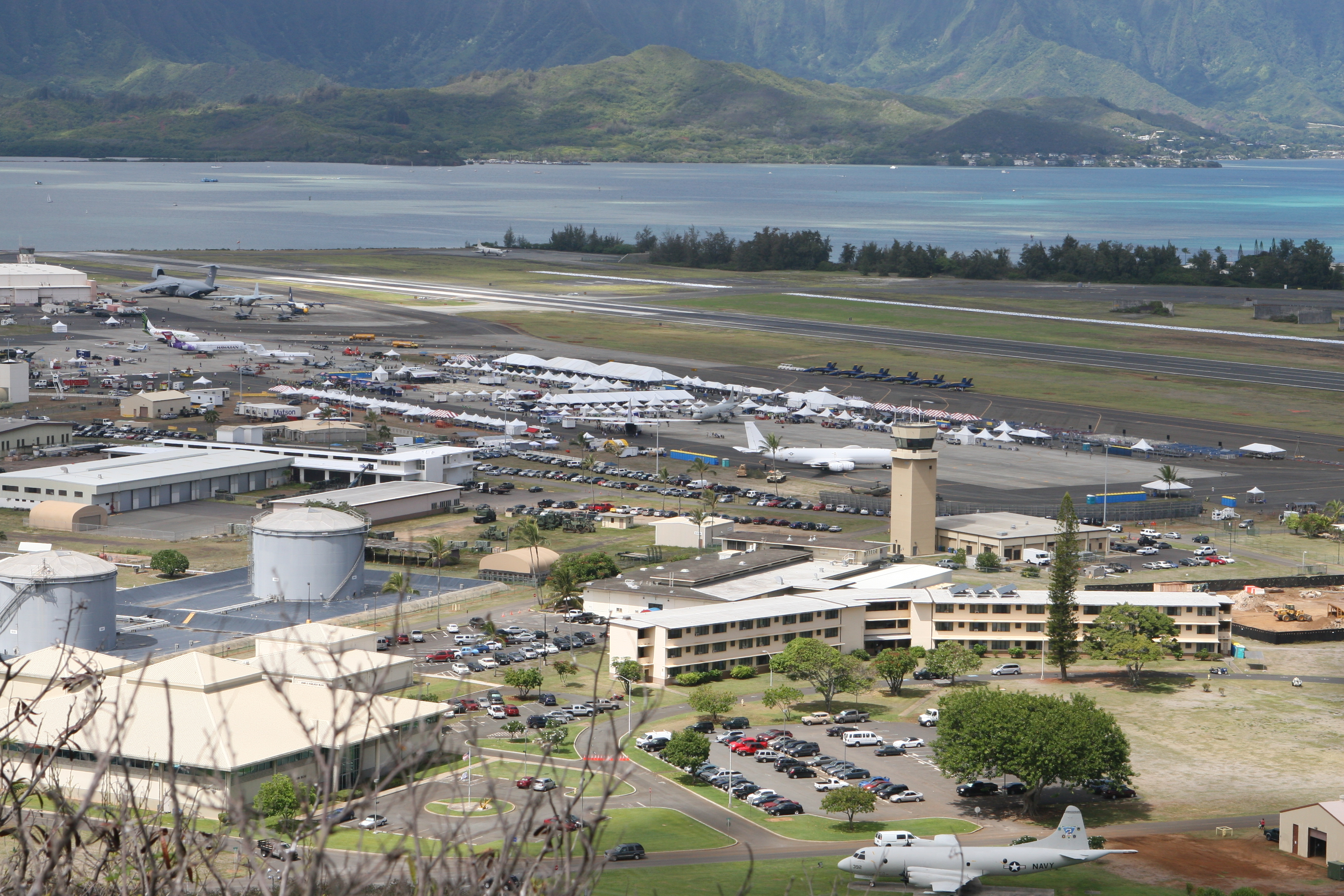
- An aerial view of MCAS Kaneohe Bay during an airshow in 2010.

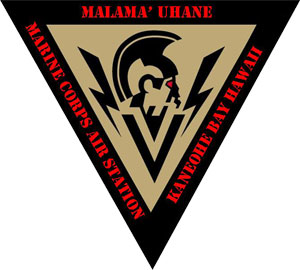

Site information
- Type: Marine Corps Air Station
- Owner: Department of Defense
- Operator: US Marine Corps
- Controlled by: Marine Corps Installations – Pacific
- Condition: Operational
- Website: www.mcbhawaii.marines.mil

Location
- Location in Hawaii
- Coordinates: 21°26′45″N 157°46′11″W

Site history
- Built: 1939
- In use: 1939 – 1949 (US Navy); 1952 – present (US Marine Corps)

Garrison information
- Current commander: Lieutenant Colonel Tyler J. Holland
- Garrison: Marine Aircraft Group 24

Airfield information
- Identifiers: IATA: NGF, ICAO: PHNG, FAA LID: NGF, WMO: 911760
- Elevation: 7 metres (23 ft) AMSL
Runways
Direction	Length and surface
4/22	2,369 metres (7,772 ft) Asphalt
- Source: Airnav.com

U.S. National Register of Historic Places

U.S. National Historic Landmark District
- Official name: Kaneohe Naval Air Station
- Designated: 28 May 1987
- Reference no.: 87001299
- Period: 1900–
- Area of significance: Military

Marine Corps Air Station Kaneohe Bay or MCAS Kaneohe Bay (IATA: NGF, ICAO: PHNG, FAA LID: NGF) is a United States Marine Corps (USMC) airfield located within the Marine Corps Base Hawaii complex, formerly known as Marine Corps Air Facility (MCAF) Kaneohe Bay or Naval Air Station (NAS) Kaneohe Bay. It is located two miles (3 km) northeast of the central business district of Kaneohe, in Honolulu County, Hawaii, United States. The airfield has one runway (4/22) with a 7,771 x 200 ft (2,369 x 61 m) asphalt surface.

== History ==
=== Fort Hase and NAS Kaneohe Bay ===
The United States Army acquired 322 acres (1.30 km^{2}) of the peninsula when President Woodrow Wilson signed executive order 2900 establishing the Kuwaaohe Military Reservation. Little is known about the operations of the fort, however, at the end of World War I, the military property was leased for ranching. In 1939, Kuwaaohe was reactivated, subjected to many name changes to include Camp Ulupa’u, and eventually named Fort Hase.

Prior to and during World War II, Fort Hase grew from a humble beginning as a defense battalion to a major unit of the Windward Coastal Artillery Command. U.S. Navy planners began to eye the peninsula in 1939 as the home of a strategic seaplane base. They liked the isolated location, the flat plains for an airfield and the probability of flights into prevailing trade winds. In 1939, the Navy acquired 464 acres (1.88 km^{2}) of the peninsula for use of the PBY Catalina patrol seaplanes for long-range reconnaissance flights. One year later, the Navy owned all of the Mokapu Peninsula except for Fort Hase. In 1939 the Navy awarded a base construction contract to the Pacific Naval Air Base Contractors consortitium (PNABC). Most of the original contract work at Kaneohe had been completed when the Navy transferred what was undone to the Seabees of the 56th Naval Construction Battalion on 1 April 1943. The 112th CB was tasked with adding a second runway 400' x 5,000' to the airfield. That was completed by the men of the 74th CB.

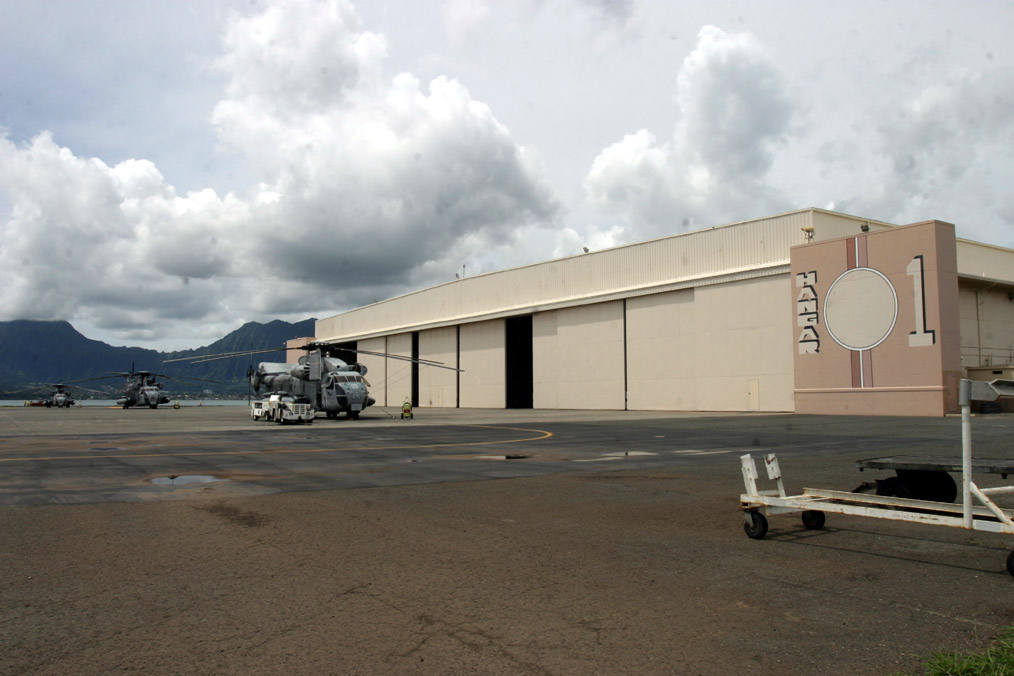
During the 1941 Attack on Pearl Harbor, portions of Hangar 1 were destroyed. In 1987, the hangar and five sea plane ramps were designated a National Historic Landmark.

7 December 1941, the Imperial Japanese Navy attacked the air station minutes prior to the attack on Pearl Harbor. Of the 36 Catalinas stationed here, 27 were destroyed and six others were damaged, along with 18 sailors who perished in the attack. The first Japanese aircraft destroyed in action were shot down at Kaneohe, along with Aviation Ordnanceman Chief Petty Officer John William Finn becoming one of the first Medal of Honor recipients of World War II for valor on that day.

During the war, the air station was a major training base in the Pacific Theater. The Fleet Gunnery School trained thousands of Navy gunners. There was a school for celestial navigation, sonar, aircraft recognition, and turret operations. Flight instructors also trained Navy and Marine Corps aviators in flight operations prior to being sent to a forward combat area. Following the war, Fort Hase had become a skeleton outpost and the air station consisted of limited air operations, a small security detachment, and a federal communications center.

In November 1958 the first of the Pacific Missile Impact Location System for the Navy's Pacific Missile Range (PMR) was operational at the station to monitor Intermediate Range Ballistic Missile (IRBM) test impacts northeast of Hawaii.

=== Marine operations ===
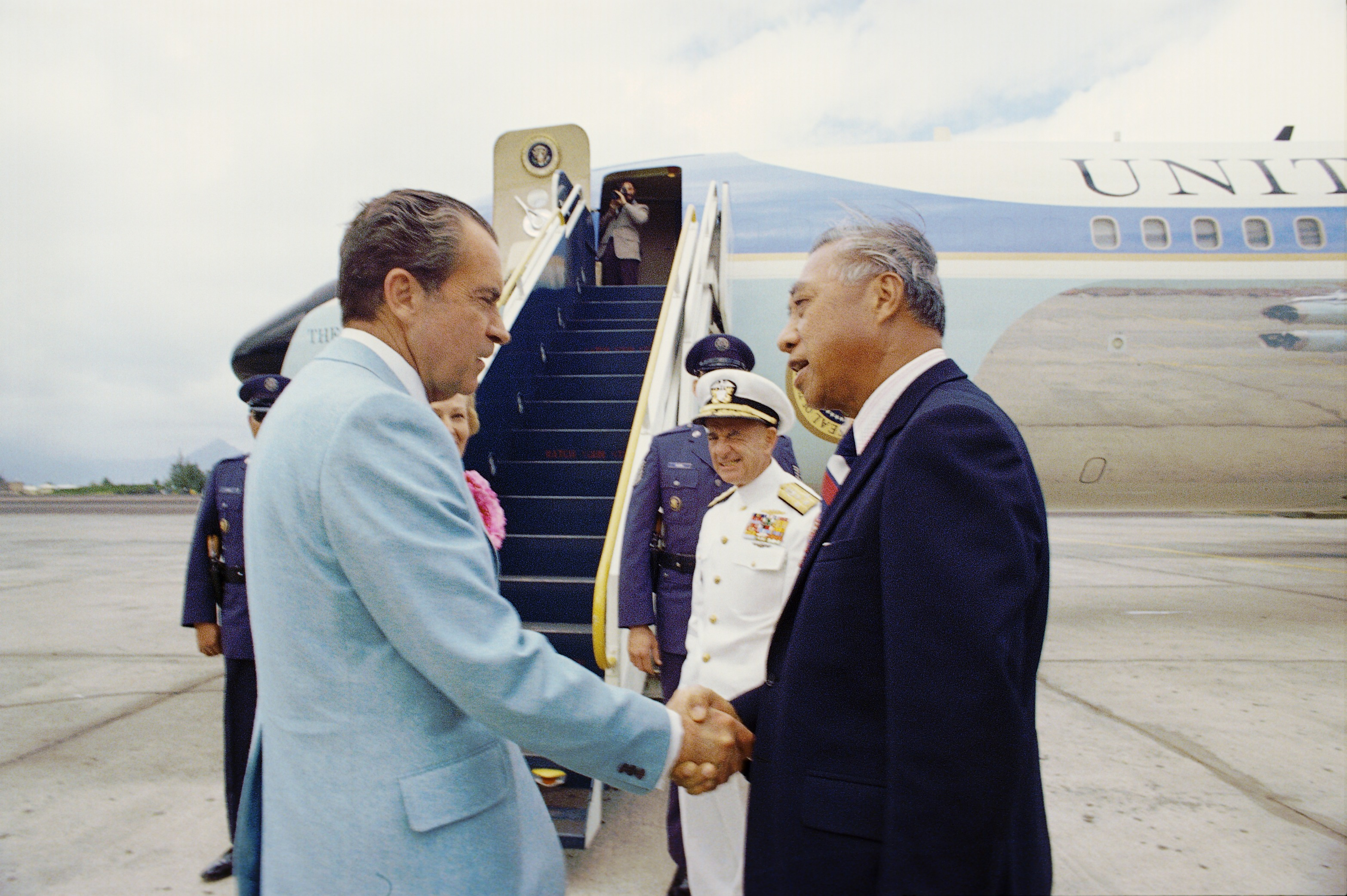
President Richard Nixon shaking hands with Senator Hiram Fong prior to departing for Guam from Kaneohe Marine Corps Air Base on February 20, 1972

In 1949, the Navy decommissioned the air station. On 15 January 1952, the U.S. Marine Corps recommissioned the idle airfield Marine Corps Air Station Kaneohe Bay, making it an ideal training site for a combined air/ground team. Station Operations and Headquarters Squadron supported flight operations until 30 June 1972, when Station Operations and Maintenance Squadron (SOMS) was commissioned in its place. SOMS served until it was disbanded on 30 July 1994. Marine Corps Air Facility Kaneohe Bay was formed on that date and continues today to serve the operational needs of the aviation community.

On 28 May 1987, the station was listed as a historic district on the National Register of Historic Places and a National Historic Landmark, in recognition of its role in World War II.

Following the 1993 Base Realignment and Closure Commission decision to close Naval Air Station Barbers Point, the base acquired four Navy P-3 Orion patrol squadrons and one SH-60 Seahawk anti-submarine squadron in 1999. By 2020 the Navy had transitioned to the P-8 and the P-3C squadrons were retired at Kaneohe. Today there are almost 10,000 active duty Navy and Marine Corps personnel there, directed by Marine Aircraft Group 24.

The installation was re-designated as an Air Station (vice an Air Facility) in May 2009. At the same time, the airfield was named for Major general Marion Eugene Carl, and the USMC announced that new squadrons would be stationed there.

== Based units ==
Flying and notable non-flying units based at MCAS Kaneohe Bay.

=== United States Marine Corps ===
Marine Corps Installations – Pacific

- Headquarters and Headquarters Squadron – C-20G Gulfstream IV

1st Marine Aircraft Wing

- Marine Aircraft Group 24
  - Marine Aviation Logistics Squadron 24 (MALS-24)
  - Marine Unmanned Aerial Vehicle Squadron 3 (VMU-3) – RQ-21A Blackjack
  - Marine Medium Tilt-Rotor Squadron 268 (VMM-268) – MV-22B Osprey
  - Marine Medium Tilt-Rotor Squadron 363 (VMM-363) – MV-22B Osprey
  - Marine Aerial Refueler Transport Squadron 153 (VMGR-153) – Lockheed Martin KC-130J

=== United States Navy ===
- Commander, Helicopter Maritime Strike Wing Pacific (CHMSWP)
  - Helicopter Maritime Strike Squadron 37 (HSM-37) – MH-60R
- Commander, Fleet Logistics Support Wing (CFLSW)
  - Fleet Logistics Support Squadron 51 (VR-51) – C-40A Clipper

== Accidents and incidents ==
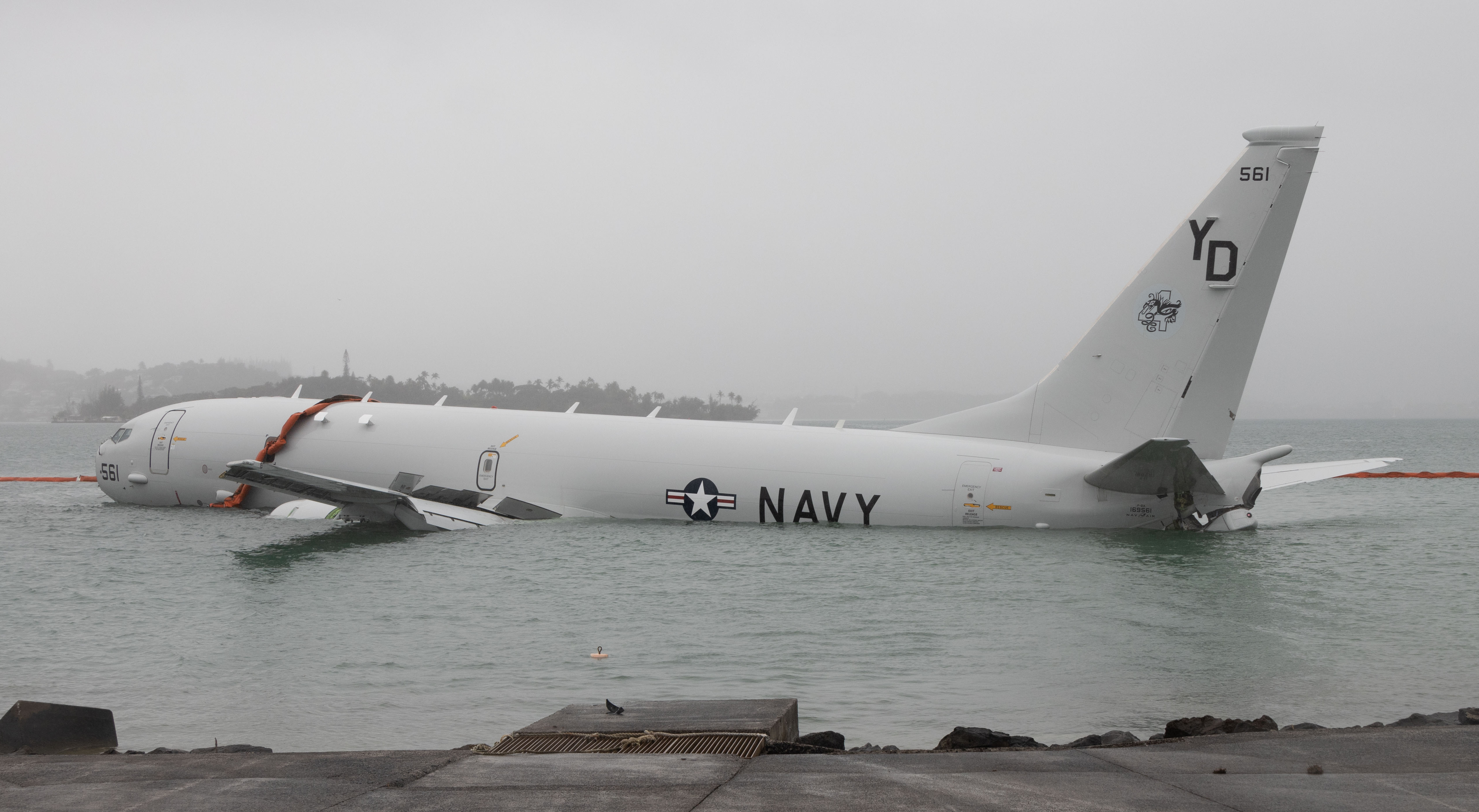
The aftermath of the November 2023 accident

- 15 January 2016 - Two Marine helicopters from the air station collided over the North Shore of Oahu, leaving twelve U.S. Marines dead.
- 20 November 2023 - A Boeing P-8A Poseidon assigned to the VP-4 suffered a runway excursion and came to rest in Kāneʻohe Bay after attempting to land on runway 22. All nine occupants onboard escaped without any injuries. The aircraft received substantial damage, and was later recovered and stored on site.

== Insignia ==
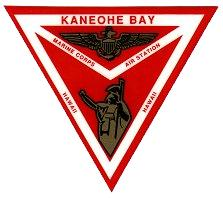
Old MCAS Kaneohe Bay insignia

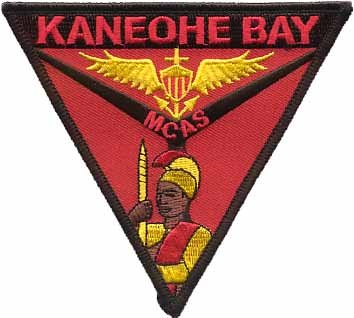
Old MCAS Kaneohe Bay patch

== See also ==
- List of National Historic Landmarks in Hawaii
- National Register of Historic Places listings in Oahu
- List of United States Marine Corps installations
- List of airports in Hawaii
- Naval Base Hawaii
