= List of vehicles of the United States Marine Corps =

This is a list of vehicles and aircraft used by the United States Marine Corps, for combat, support, and motor transport.

== Vehicles ==
The below list contains vehicles confirmed to be in service as of early 2022. This list may not include stored or limited use equipment.

Model	Image	Origin	Type	Variant	Number	Details
Infantry fighting vehicles
ACV		United States Italy	Infantry fighting vehicle	ACV-P ACV-C ACV-30 ACV-R	352 ACV-P 29 ACV-C	38 ACV-P On Order 175 ACV-30 On Order
LAV-25		Canada United States	Infantry fighting vehicle	Armored-reconnaissance (LAV-25)	488	Looking for successor to the reconnaissance variant, the Textron Cottonmouth 6×6 or a GDLS Advanced Reconnaissance Vehicle 8×8. Six variants are expected: C4/UAS; Logistics; 30mm Cannon; Recovery; Counter-drone; Organic precision fires
LAV-25		Canada United States	Infantry fighting vehicle	Command and control (LAV-C2)	66	Looking for successor to the reconnaissance variant, the Textron Cottonmouth 6×6 or a GDLS Advanced Reconnaissance Vehicle 8×8. Six variants are expected: C4/UAS; Logistics; 30mm Cannon; Recovery; Counter-drone; Organic precision fires
LAV-25		Canada United States	Infantry fighting vehicle	Logistics cargo carrier (LAV-LOG)	127	Looking for successor to the reconnaissance variant, the Textron Cottonmouth 6×6 or a GDLS Advanced Reconnaissance Vehicle 8×8. Six variants are expected: C4/UAS; Logistics; 30mm Cannon; Recovery; Counter-drone; Organic precision fires
LAV-25		Canada United States	Infantry fighting vehicle	Electronic warfare (LAV-MEWSS)	14	Looking for successor to the reconnaissance variant, the Textron Cottonmouth 6×6 or a GDLS Advanced Reconnaissance Vehicle 8×8. Six variants are expected: C4/UAS; Logistics; 30mm Cannon; Recovery; Counter-drone; Organic precision fires
LAV-25		Canada United States	Infantry fighting vehicle	Recovery (LAV-R)	45	Looking for successor to the reconnaissance variant, the Textron Cottonmouth 6×6 or a GDLS Advanced Reconnaissance Vehicle 8×8. Six variants are expected: C4/UAS; Logistics; 30mm Cannon; Recovery; Counter-drone; Organic precision fires
LAV-25		Canada United States	Infantry fighting vehicle	Anti tank (LAV-AT)	106	Looking for successor to the reconnaissance variant, the Textron Cottonmouth 6×6 or a GDLS Advanced Reconnaissance Vehicle 8×8. Six variants are expected: C4/UAS; Logistics; 30mm Cannon; Recovery; Counter-drone; Organic precision fires
LAV-25		Canada United States	Infantry fighting vehicle	Self-propelled mortar (LAV-M)	65	Looking for successor to the reconnaissance variant, the Textron Cottonmouth 6×6 or a GDLS Advanced Reconnaissance Vehicle 8×8. Six variants are expected: C4/UAS; Logistics; 30mm Cannon; Recovery; Counter-drone; Organic precision fires
LAV-25		Canada United States	Infantry fighting vehicle	Light Nuclear, Biological, and Chemical Reconnaissance (LAV-JSLNBCRS)	31	Looking for successor to the reconnaissance variant, the Textron Cottonmouth 6×6 or a GDLS Advanced Reconnaissance Vehicle 8×8. Six variants are expected: C4/UAS; Logistics; 30mm Cannon; Recovery; Counter-drone; Organic precision fires
Self-propelled artillery
M142 HIMARS		United States	Rocket artillery	Armoured M142 HIMARS	47	Only FMTV use in USMC
NMESIS		United States	Rocket artillery		261 by 2033	Naval Strike Missile on JLTV-platform
Transport vehicles
MTVR		United States	Transport vehicle	Troop transport (MK-23/MK-25/AMK-23/AMK-25/MK-27/MK-28/AMK-27/AMK-28/MK-28C)	11,400	
MTVR		United States	Transport vehicle	Dump truck (MK-29/MK-30/AMK-29/AMK-30)	11,400	
MTVR		United States	Transport vehicle	Medium equipment transporter (MK-31/MK-32/AMK-31/AMK-32)	11,400	
MTVR		United States	Transport vehicle	Wrecker (MK-36/AMK-36)	11,400	
MTVR		United States	Transport vehicle	M142 HIMARS Resupply truck with crane (MK-37)	11,400	
MTVR		United States	Transport vehicle	M142 HIMARS trailer (MK-38)	11,400	
LVSR		United States	Transport vehicle	Cargo (MKR-18)		
LVSR		United States	Transport vehicle	Tractor (MKR-16)		
LVSR		United States	Transport vehicle	Wrecker (MKR-15)		
Infantry mobility vehicles and support vehicles
Cougar		South Africa United States	Mine resistant ambush protected vehicle		1,725	
JLTV		United States	Light tactical vehicle	Heavy guns carrier (M1278 JLTV-HGC)	3,700	
JLTV		United States	Light tactical vehicle	Utility (M1279 JLTV-UTL)	3,700	
JLTV		United States	Light tactical vehicle	General purpose (M1280 JLTV-GP)	3,700	
JLTV		United States	Light tactical vehicle	Close combat weapons carrier (M1281 JLTV-CCWC)	3,700	
M-ATV		United States	Light tactical vehicle		704	
M1161 Growler	USMC ITV ESS	United States	Fast Attack Vehicle/Light utility vehicle	M1161 Light Utility	~1,600	The M1163 is the prime mover for the M327 Mortar system
M1161 Growler	USMC ITV ESS	United States	Fast Attack Vehicle/Light utility vehicle	M1163 Prime Mover	~1,600	The M1163 is the prime mover for the M327 Mortar system
MRZR		United States	Light utility vehicle			[known in the Marines as the ultra light tactical vehicle (ULTV)]
HMMWV		United States	Light utility vehicle	Troop transport (M1123)		
HMMWV		United States	Light utility vehicle	Heavy cargo truck (M1097A2)		
HMMWV		United States	Light utility vehicle	Armament carrier (M1043A2)		
HMMWV		United States	Light utility vehicle	TOW carrier (M1045A2)		
HMMWV		United States	Light utility vehicle	Ambulance (M1035A2)		
HMMWV		United States	Light utility vehicle	Ambulance (M997A2)		
HMMWV		United States	Light utility vehicle	Armament carrier (M1114)		
HMMWV		United States	Light utility vehicle	Armament carrier (M1151)		
HMMWV		United States	Light utility vehicle	Heavy cargo truck (M1152A1)		
HMMWV		United States	Light utility vehicle	Troop transport (M1165)		
Engineering vehicles and specialized vehicles
Buffalo		United States	Military engineering vehicle		38	
Husky		South Africa	Military engineering vehicle			
M9 ACE		United States	Military engineering vehicle			
P-19R ARFF		United States	Fire-fighting vehicle			

== Aircraft ==
=== F/A-18 Hornet ===
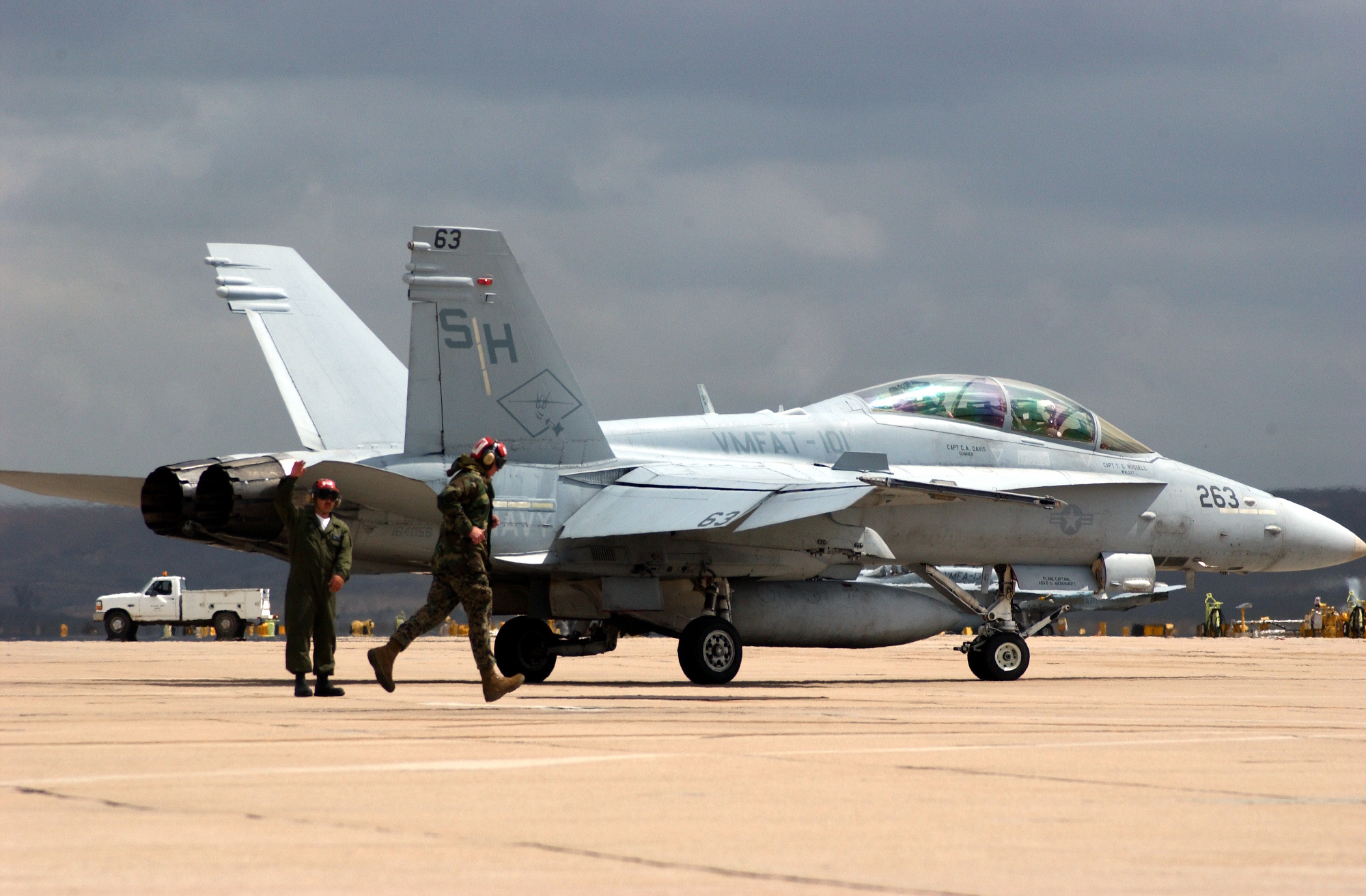
F/A-18D

- F/A-18A/C/CN fighter/attack

Inventory: 132

- F/A-18B/D fighter/attack/training

Inventory: 45

=== F-35 Lightning II ===
- F-35B V/STOL variant. Planned total of 280 F-35Bs to replace F/A-18 and AV-8B.
- F-35C carrier variant Planned total of 140 F-35Cs (CTOL) to replace F/A-18.
- Total inventory F-35B/F-35C (including training aircraft): 175 (as of November 2025).

=== AV-8 Harrier ===
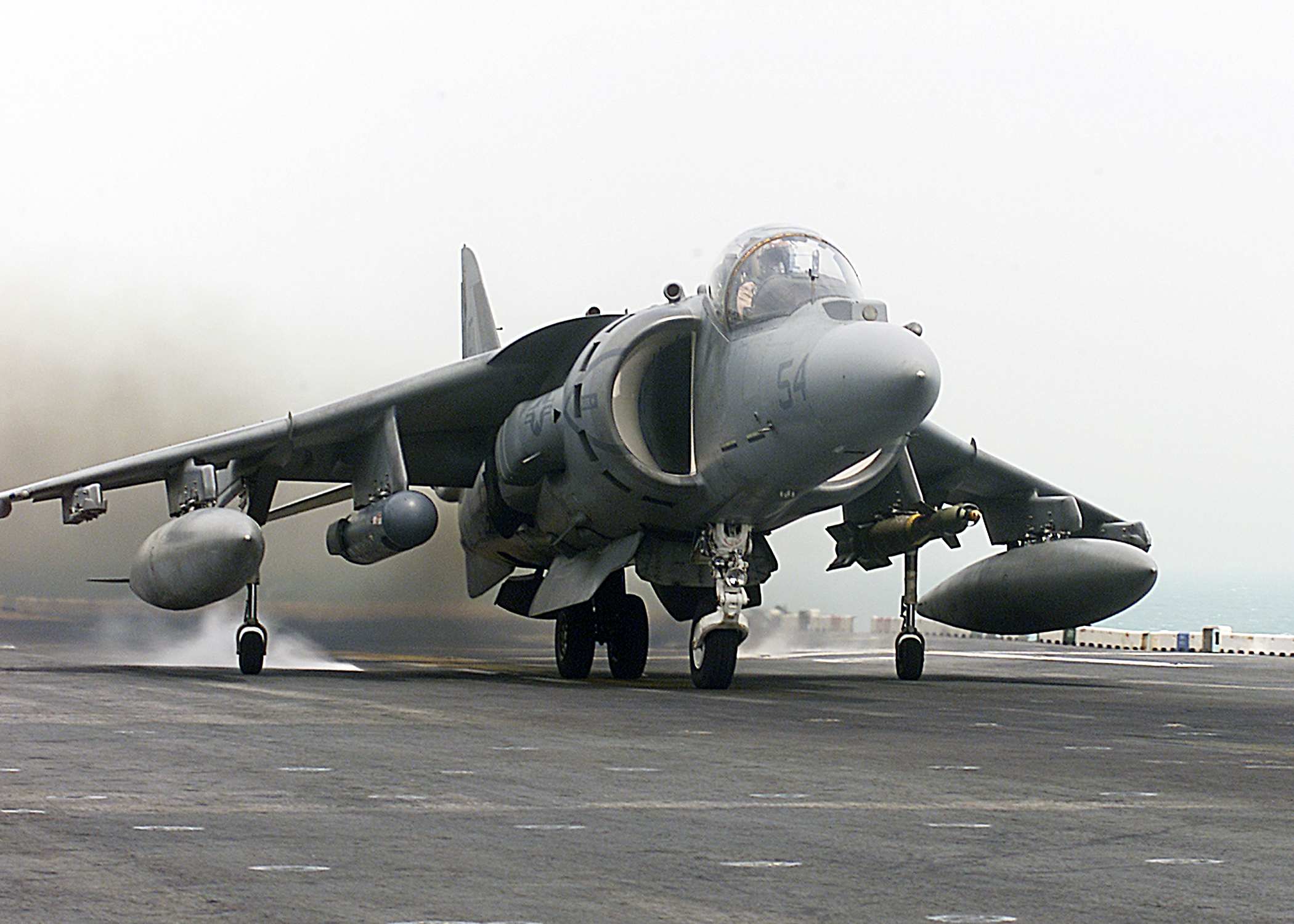
AV-8B Harrier II on the deck of USS Nassau (LHA-4)

- AV-8B Harrier II fighter/attack

Inventory: 78

- TAV-8 Harrier trainer

Inventory: 11

=== KC-130 Hercules/Super Hercules ===
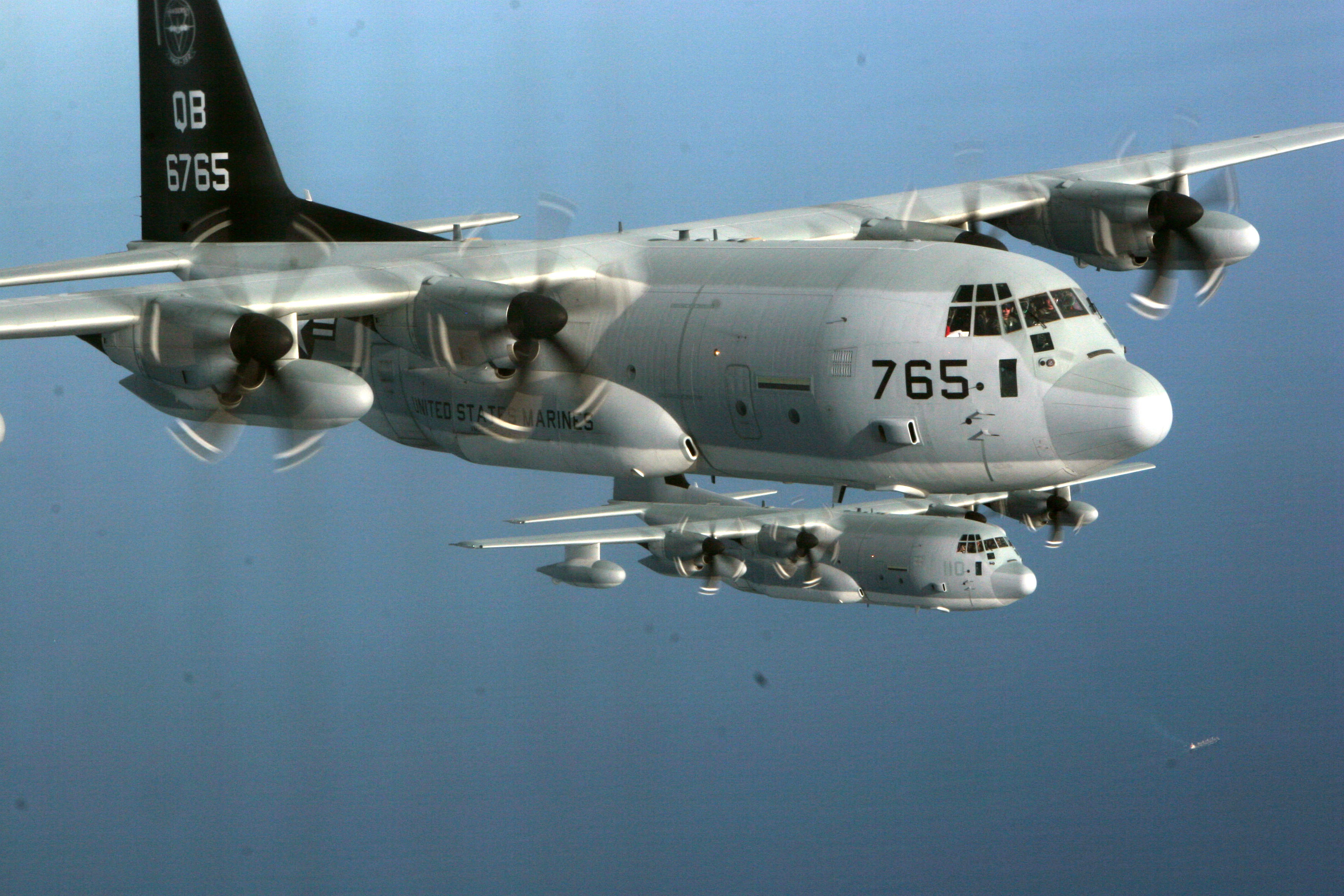
KC-130J Hercules

- KC-130J Super Hercules refueler/transport

Inventory: 76

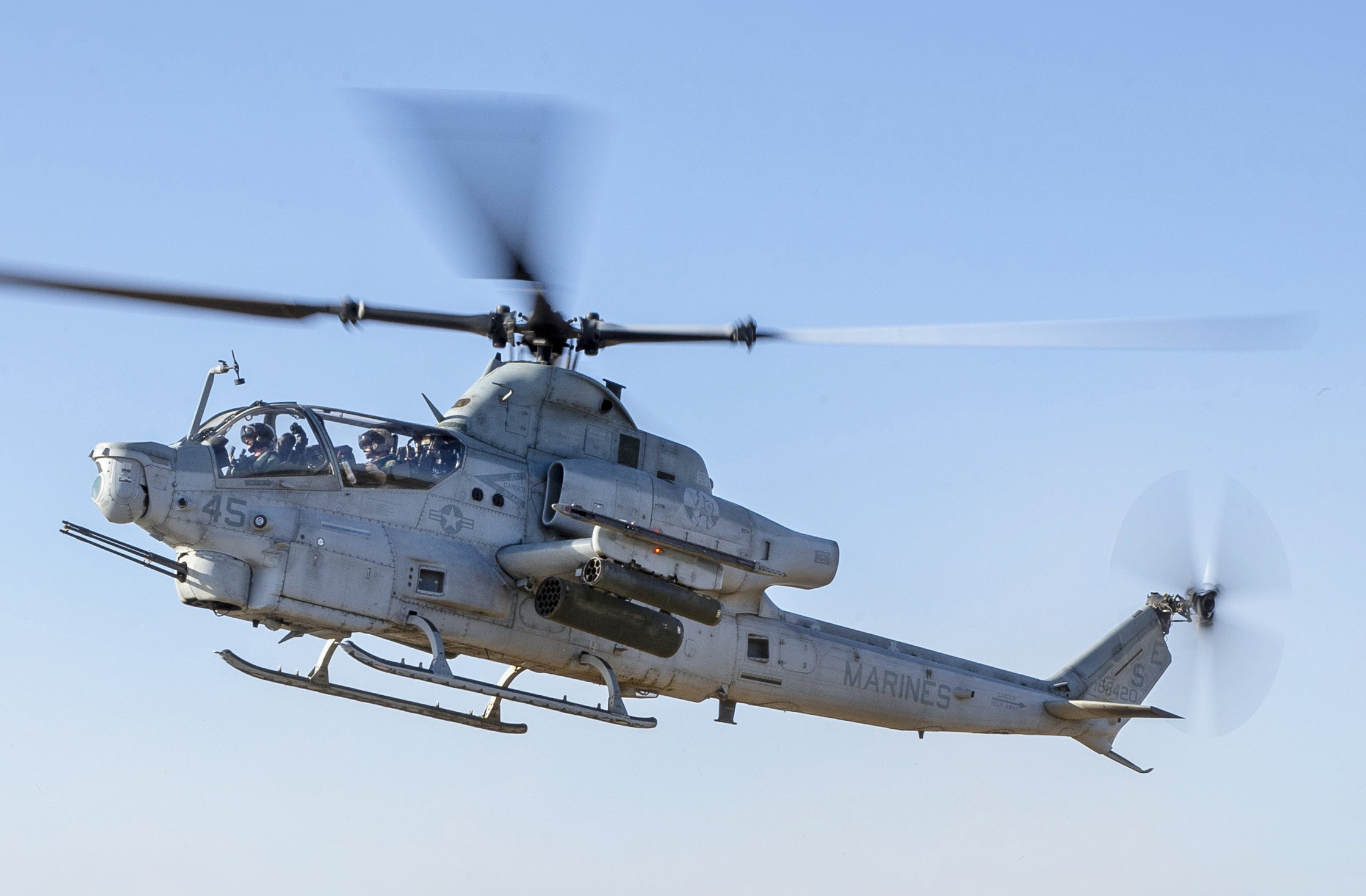
AH-1Z Viper

=== AH-1 Cobra ===
Inventory: 189

- AH-1Z Viper helicopter gunship

=== UH-1Y Venom ===
- UH-1Y Venom

Inventory: 140

=== CH-53E Super Stallion ===
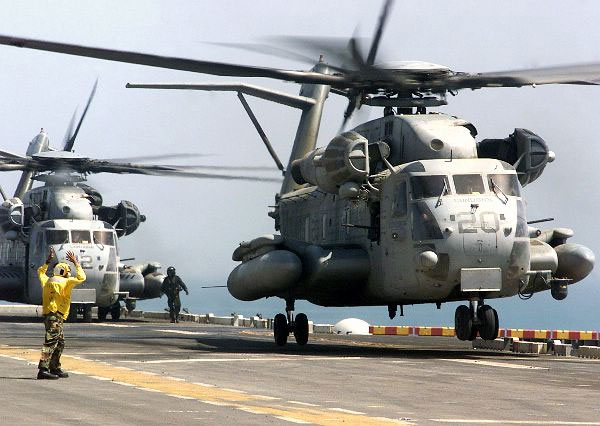
CH-53E Super Stallion

- CH-53E Super Stallion upgraded cargo/passenger helicopter

Inventory: 128

- CH-53K King Stallion

Inventory: 19

=== MV-22 Osprey ===
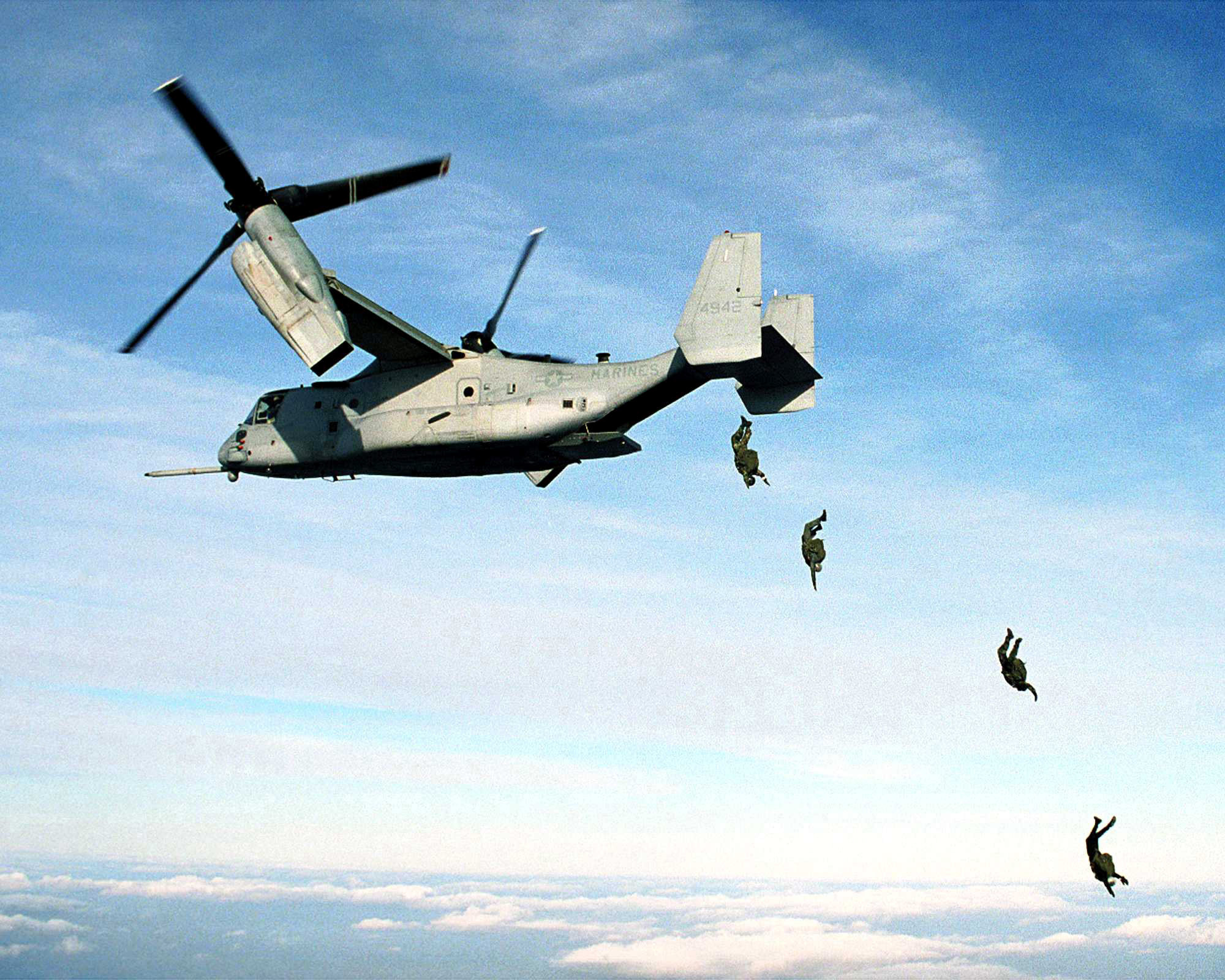
MV-22B Osprey

- MV-22B Osprey cargo/passenger tiltrotor

Inventory (Planned total): 348

=== Unmanned aerial vehicles ===
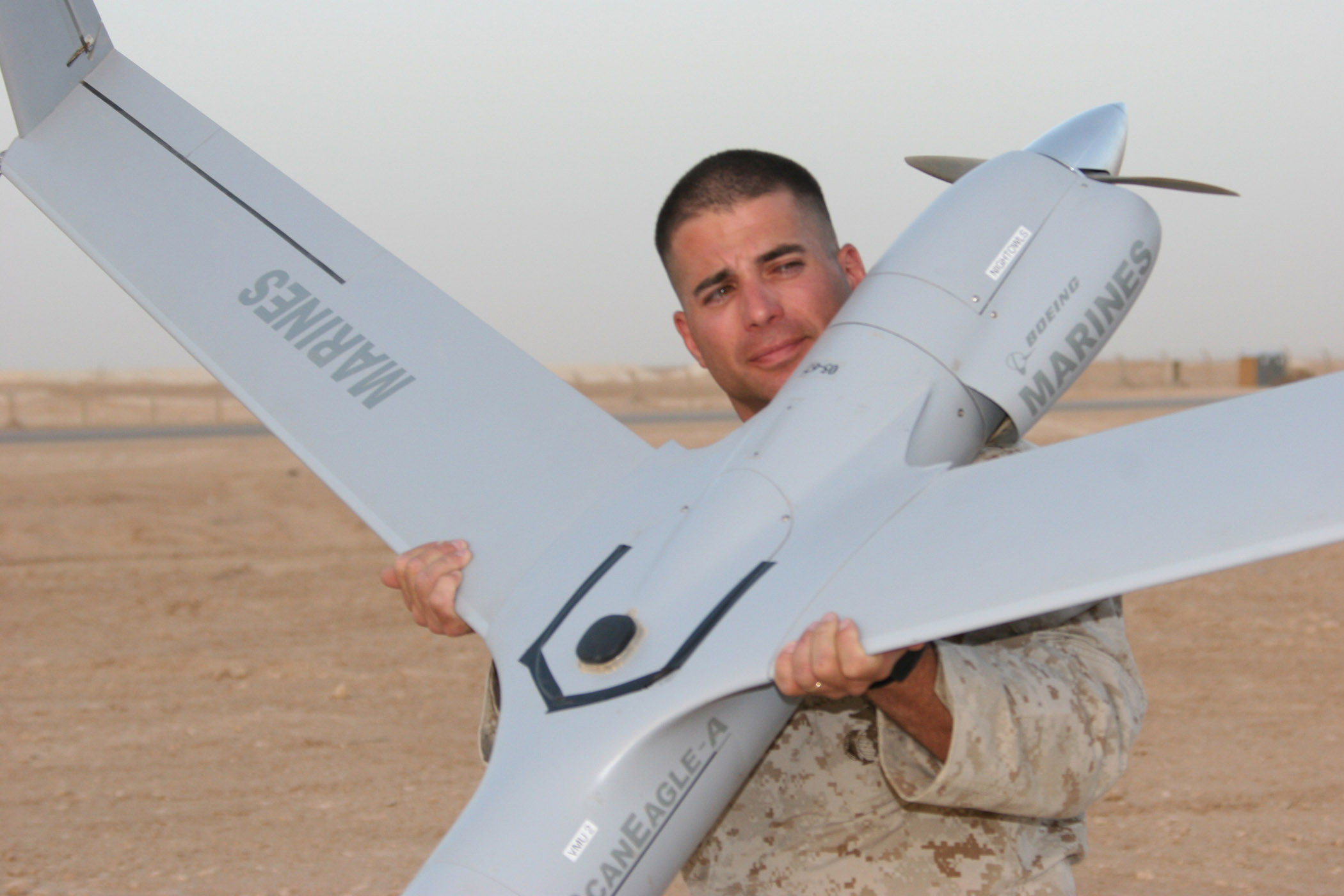
ScanEagle UAV

- Wasp reconnaissance
- AeroVironment Switchblade attack
- RQ-11 Raven reconnaissance
- RQ-14 Dragon Eye reconnaissance
- RQ-20 Puma reconnaissance
- T-20 reconnaissance
- ScanEagle reconnaissance
- RQ-21A Blackjack reconnaissance
- InstantEye reconnaissance

== Testing/Limited Use ==
=== Prototypes/Testing/Experimental ===
- LAV-MEWSS (Mobile Electronic Warfare Support System) electronic warfare
- LAV-EFSS (Expeditionary Fire Support System) replacement for LAV-M
- Expeditionary Fighting Vehicle (EFV) replacement for AAV
- Amphibious Combat Vehicle (ACV) replacement for AAV
- F-35B Lightning II replacement for AV-8B and F/A-18
- Sikorsky CH-53K
- Unmanned K-MAX

==== HMMWV replacement ====
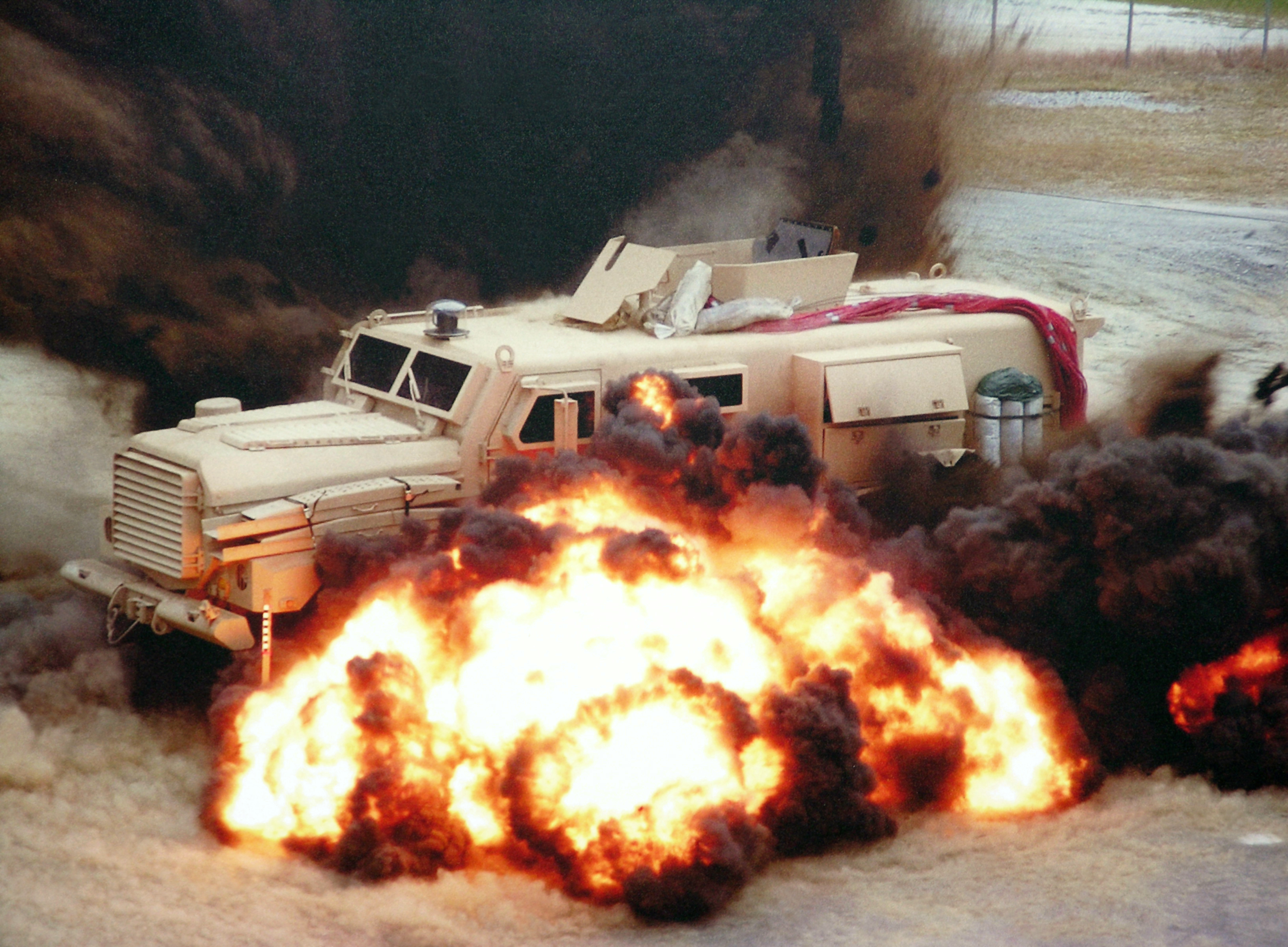
FPI Cougar HE in testing

Accepted for short term partial replacements until development of the Joint Light Tactical Vehicle is complete (see also: Medium Mine Protected Vehicle)

MRAP-MRUV (Mine Resistant Ambush Protected - Mine Resistant Utility Vehicle)

- BAE Caiman
- BAE OMC RG-31 Nyala
- BAE RG-33 4×4
- Force Protection Cougar H 4×4
- International MaxxPro

MRAP-JERRV (Mine Resistant Ambush Protected - Joint Explosive Ordnance Disposal Rapid Response Vehicle)

- Force Protection Cougar HE 6×6
- BAE RG-33L 6×6
- GDLS RG-31E
- International MaxxPro XL
- BAE Caiman
- Force Protection Buffalo

MRAP M-ATV (Mine Resistant Ambush Protected-All Terrain Vehicle)

- Oshkosh M-ATV

=== Uncommon/Unique ===
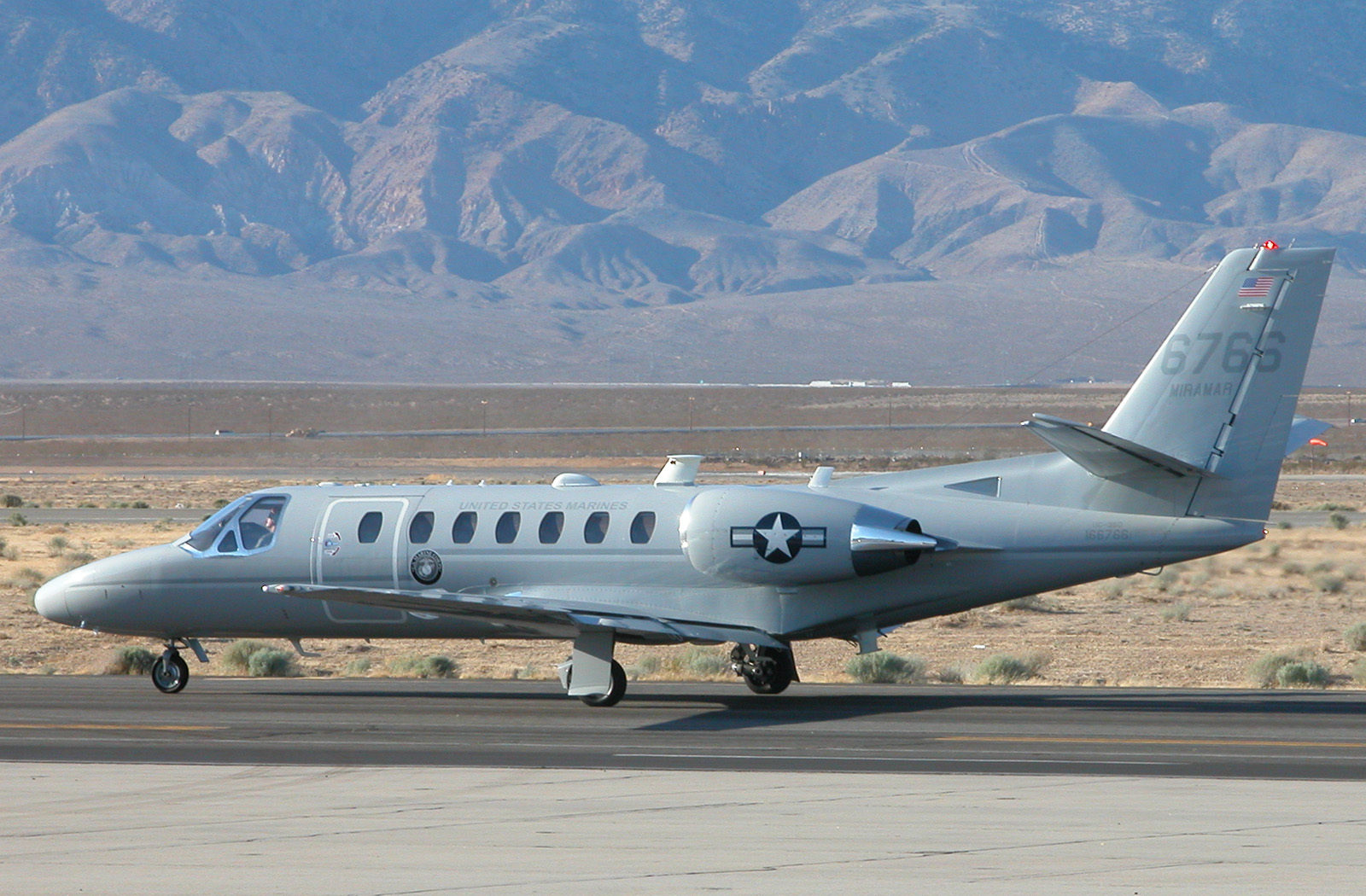
UC-35D

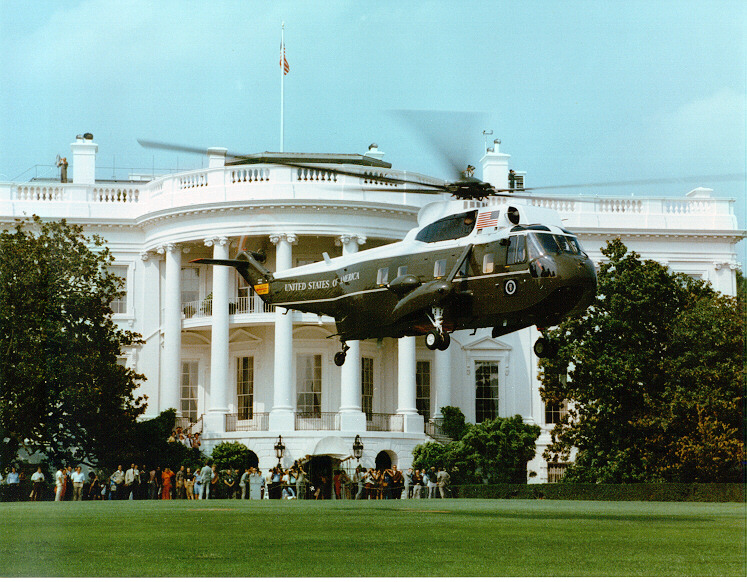
Marine One

- Commercial Utility Cargo Vehicle M88x, M89x, and M1010 series
- M1030M1 Motorcycle
- various GME vehicles, to include the John Deere Gator
- C-9B Skytrain II VIP passenger
- C-12 Huron VIP passenger
- UC-35D VIP passenger
- C-20G Gulfstream VIP passenger
- F-5E/F Tiger II opposing force trainers
- HH-1N SAR helicopter
- Marine One
  - VH-3D Sea King
  - VH-60N White hawk
- C-130T "Fat Albert" used with the Blue Angels

== Retired ==
=== Wheeled Vehicles ===
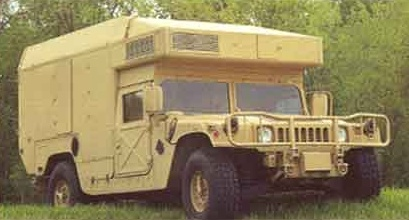
M997A2 HMMWV ambulance

- Humvee Base fleet (1984–1993):
  - M998/M1097 troop/cargo/MRC radio truck
    - AN/MRC-XXX (110/135/138/140/142/145/148) Radio vehicles
    - AN/USQ-70 PADS (Position Azimuth Determining System) survey vehicle
  - M1097 heavy cargo truck
    - M1097 Avenger anti-aircraft platform
    - M1097 maintenance contact truck (C7033 equipment)
  - M1037/M1042 S250 electronic shelter carrier
  - M1043/M1044 armament carrier
  - M1045/M1046 TOW missile carrier
  - M1035 2-litter ambulance
  - M997 4-litter ambulance

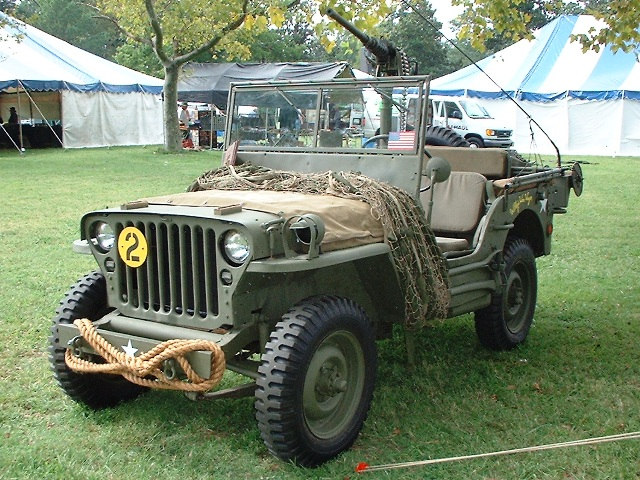
M38 Jeep

- M3 Scout Car (limited use)
- Jeep BRC-40 MA/MB GP/GPW
  - M38 truck
  - M151 1/4 ton truck
  - M606 truck
  - M422 Mighty Mite
  - M715 Kaiser
- Desert Patrol Vehicle "dune buggy"
- M35 series 2½ ton cargo truck "deuce and a half"
- DUKW
- M54 truck
- 5-ton truck series:
  - cargo: M813, M814, M923, M924, M925, M926, M928, M927, M939
  - bolster: M815
  - dump: M817, M929, M930
  - tractor: M818, M931, M932
  - wrecker: M816, M936
  - tractor/wrecker w/ 5th wheel: M819, M933
  - van: M820, M934, M935
  - bridging: M821

=== Tracked Vehicles ===
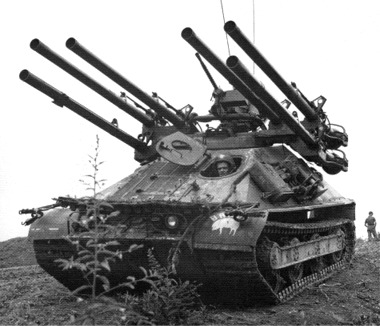
M50 Ontos

- M2 Half Track Car
- M3 Half-track
- M50 Ontos self-propelled recoilless rifle
- M110/M107 self-propelled howitzer
- M2 Light Tank
- M3 Stuart flamethrower tank
- M4 Sherman tank
- M48 Patton tank
- M60 Patton tank
- M103 heavy tank
- M1 Abrams tank - 403 tanks put in storage
- LVT-1/2/3/4 Landing Vehicle, Tracked
- LVT-5 Amphibious Tractor
- AAV-7
- M1150 Assault Breacher Vehicle
- M60 AVLB

=== Artillery ===
- M108 Self Propelled Howitzer
- M109 Self Propelled Howitzer
- M110 Self Propelled Howitzer
- M91 Multiple Rocket Launcher
- MIM-23 Hawk Medium-Range Surface-to-air Missile System

=== Aircraft ===
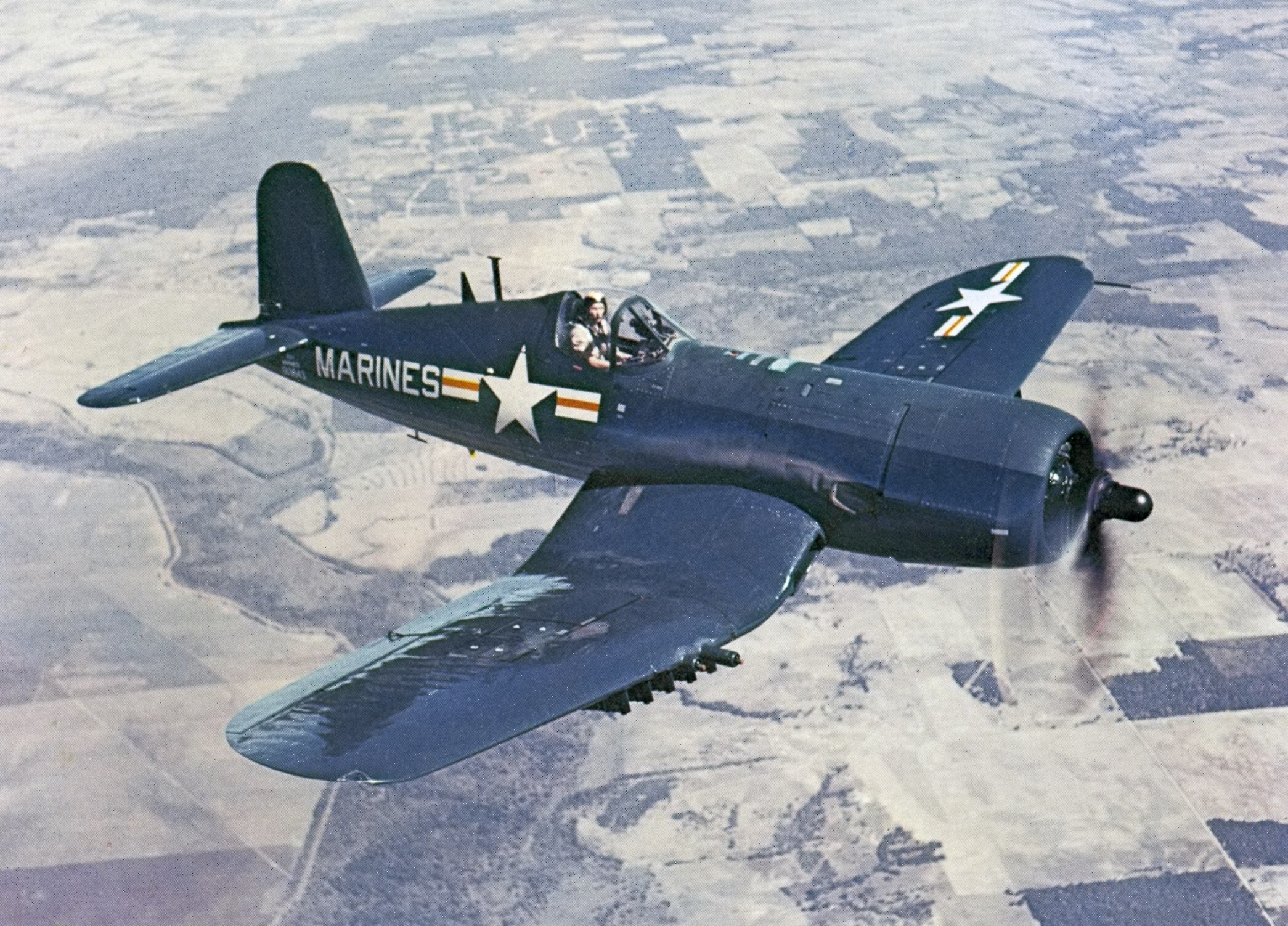
F4U Corsair

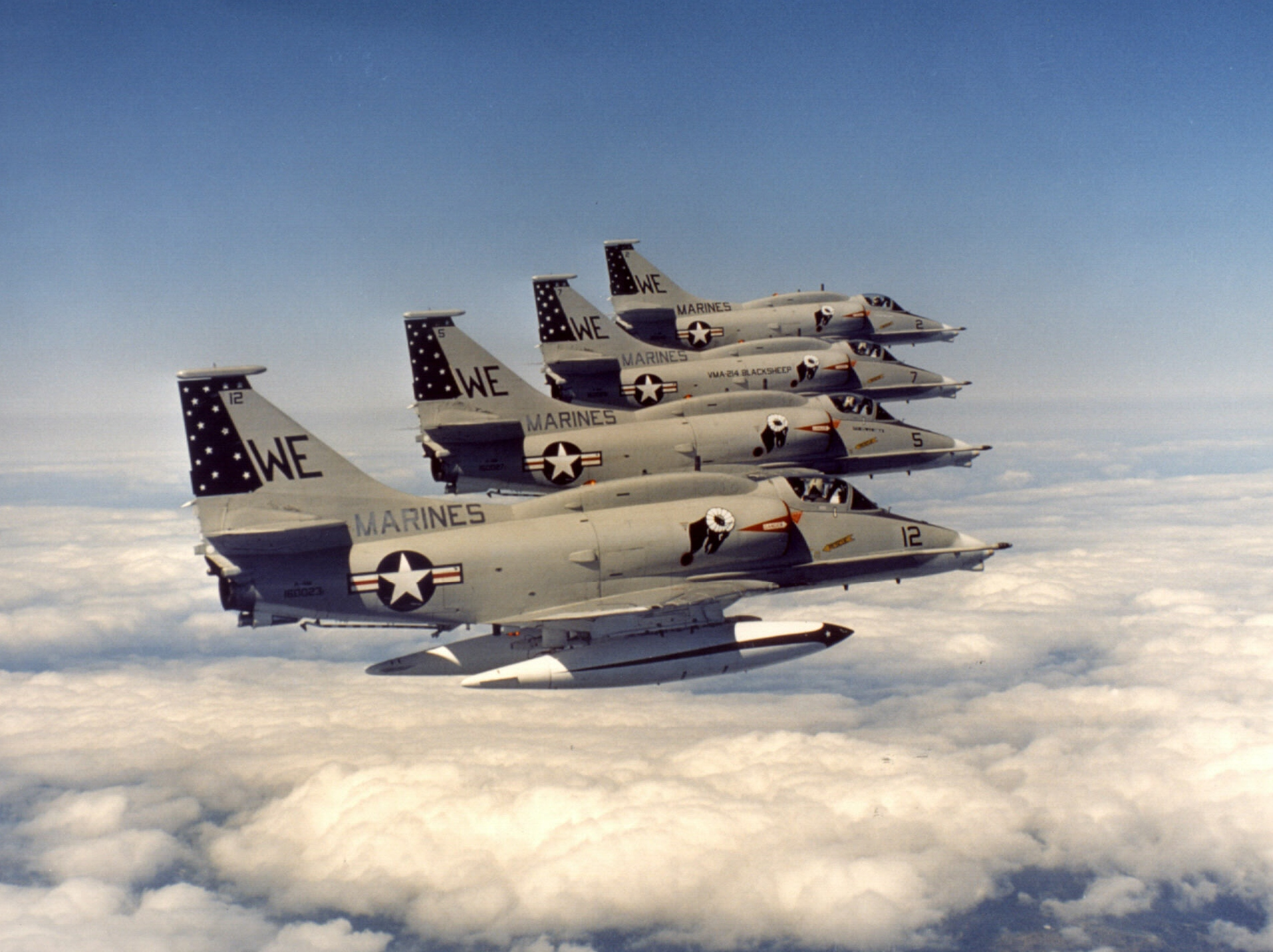
A-4 Skyhawk

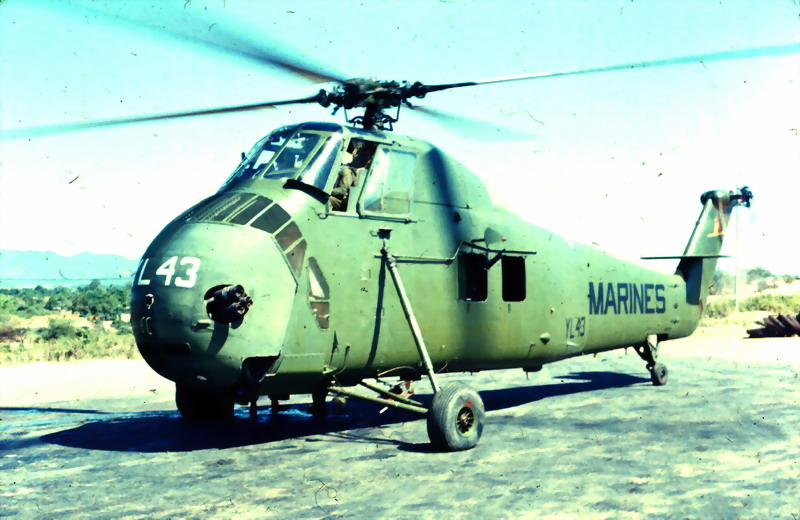
H-34 Choctaw

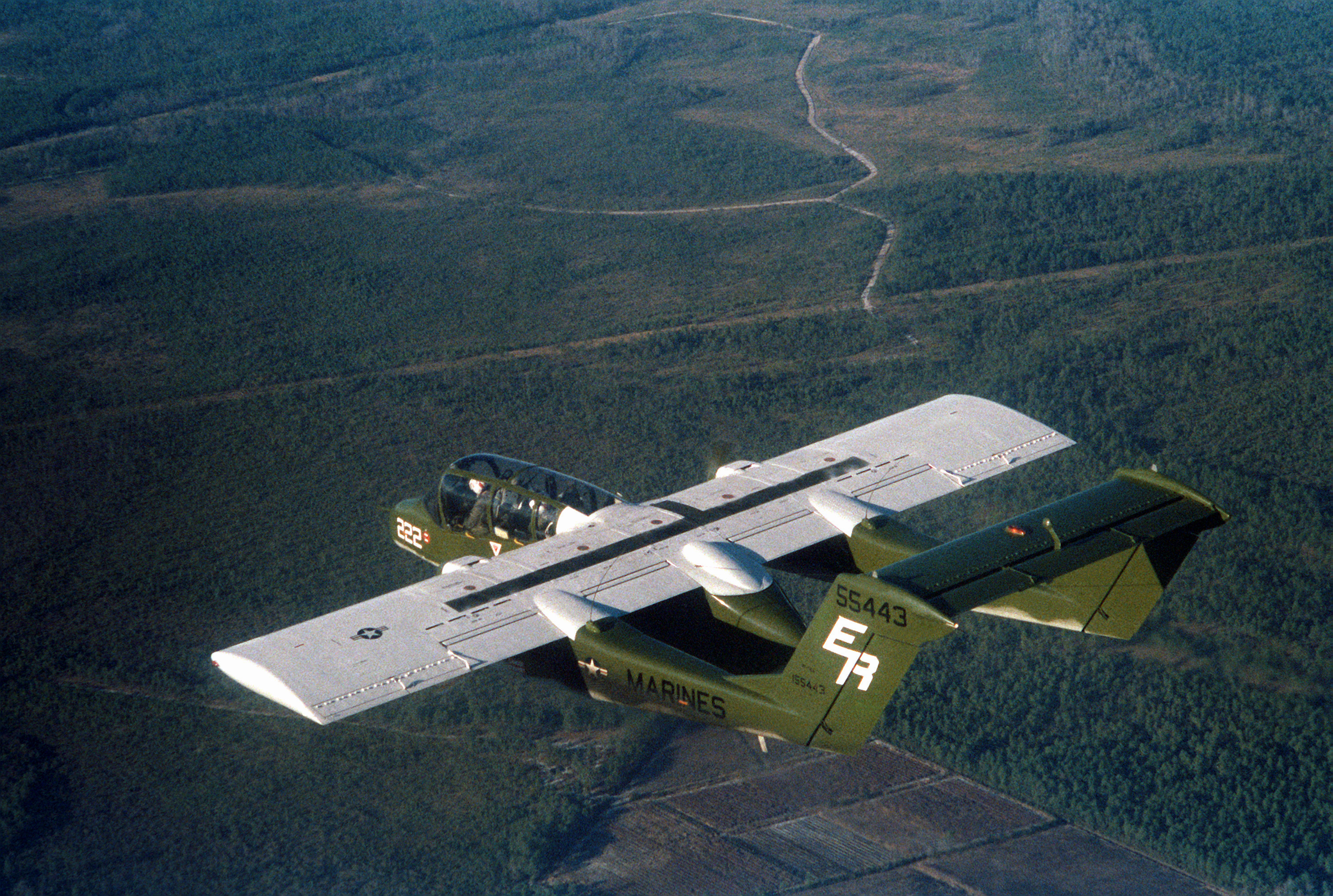
OV-10A Bronco

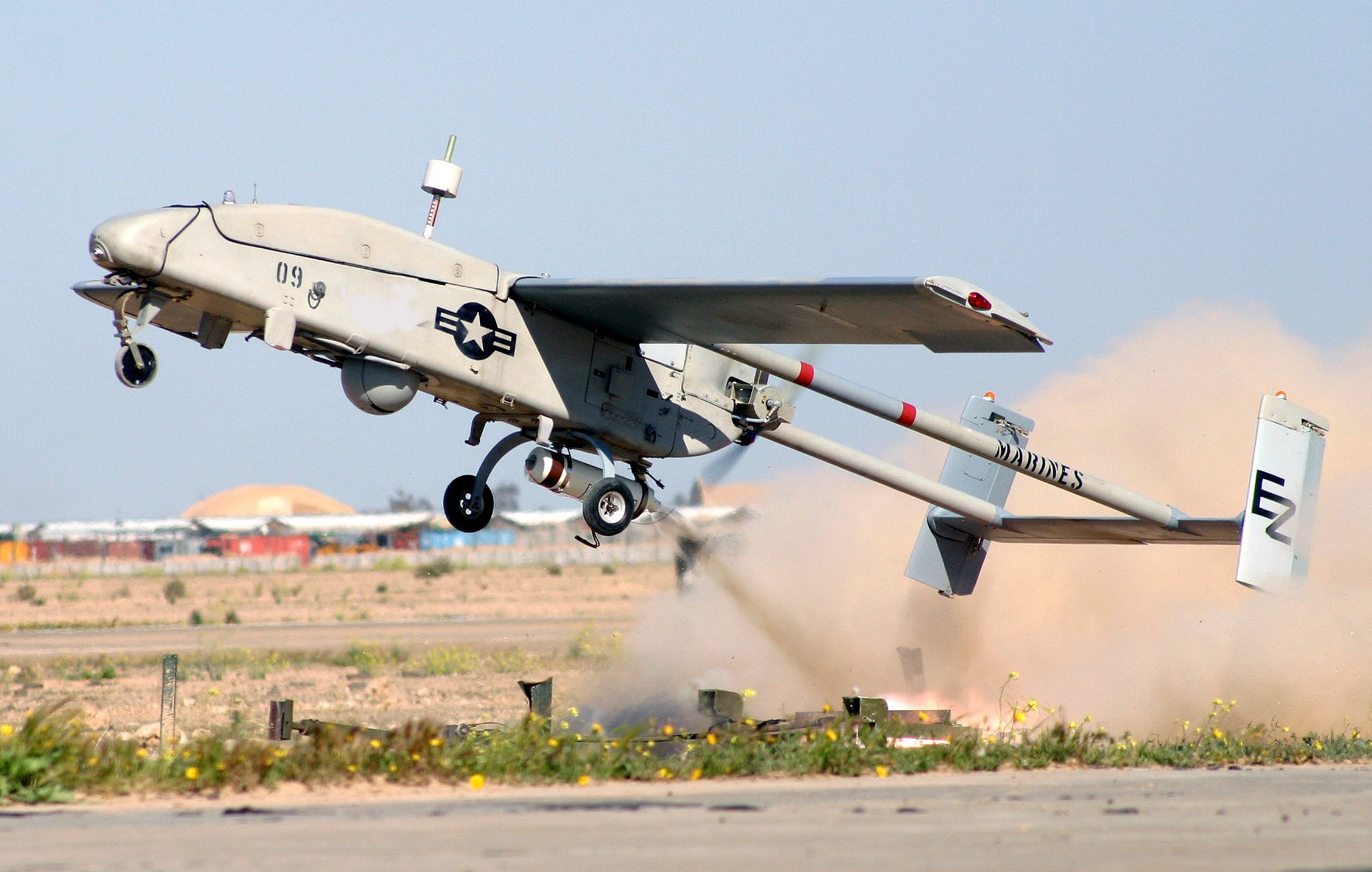
RQ-2 Pioneer

- Vought VE-7 Fighter biplane
- O2U Corsair Scout biplane
- SOC Seagull Observation biplane
- FF-1 Fighter biplane
- F2F Fighter biplane
- F3F Fighter biplane
- F2A Buffalo Fighter
- F4F Wildcat Fighter
- F4U Corsair Fighter
- SBD Dauntless Dive bomber
- SB2C Helldiver Dive bomber
- TBF Avenger Torpedo bomber
- PBJ-1 Mitchell Bomber
- JM-1 Marauder Towing aircraft
- PV-1 Ventura Night fighter
- PB4Y-1 Liberator Reconnaissance
- PB4Y-2 Privateer Reconnaissance
- F6F Hellcat Fighter
- F8F Bearcat Fighter
- A-1 Skyraider Attack/bomber
  - A/D-5Q Skyraider Electronic warfare
- FJ Fury Jet Fighter
- F9F Panther Fighter
- FH-1 Phantom Fighter
- F2H Banshee Fighter
- F-9 Cougar Fighter
- F-10 Skyknight Fighter
  - EF-10 Skyknight Electronic warfare
- A-4 Skyhawk Attack
- F6 Skyray Fighter
- F-8 Crusader Fighter
  - RF-8A Crusader Reconnaissance
- F-4 Phantom II Fighter/attack/bomber
  - RF-4B Phantom Reconnaissance
- A-6 Intruder Attack
  - EA-6A Electric Intruder Electronic warfare (precursor to EA-6 Prowler)
- OV-10 Bronco Observation aircraft
- R4D Skytrain Cargo plane
- R5D Skymaster Cargo plane
- R5C Commando Cargo plane
- R4Q Flying Boxcar Cargo plane
- HRS-1 Chickasaw Cargo helicopter
- CH-43 Choctaw Cargo helicopter
- CH-3 Sea King Cargo helicopter
- UH-1N Twin Huey Utility helicopter
- UH-1D/H Iroqouis "Huey" Utility helicopter
- AH-1 Cobra "HueyCobra" Attack helicopter
- VH-71 Kestrel replacement for Marine One VH-3D Sea King and VH-60N Nighthawk was cancelled in 2009
- Mastiv RPV system UAV
- RQ-2 Pioneer UAV reconnaissance
- Barrage balloon
- Glider
- CH-46 Sea Knight Cargo/passenger helicopter
- CH-53D Sea Stallion Cargo/passenger helicopter
- KC-130F/R Hercules tactical aerial refueler/assault transport
- RQ-7 Shadow reconnaissance

== See also ==
- List of military aircraft of the United States
- List of land vehicles of the U.S. armed forces
- List of U.S. military vehicles by model number
- United States Marine Corps Aviation
- Boomerang (mobile shooter detection system)
