= AeroVironment SkyTote =

Unmanned Aerial Vehicle

SkyTote
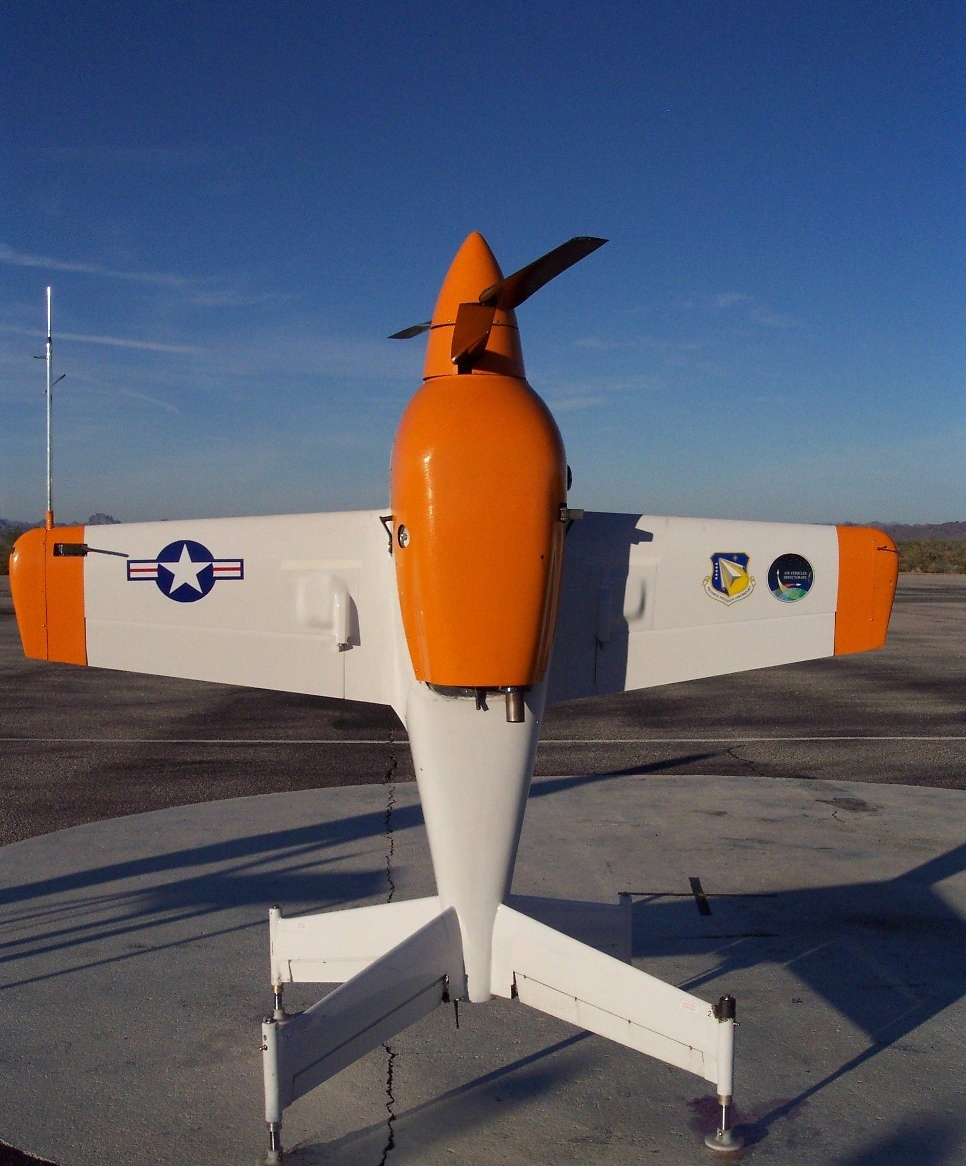
- SkyTote

General information
- Type: Unmanned aerial vehicle
- Manufacturer: AeroVironment
- Designer: AeroVironment
- Status: Retired
- Primary user: Air Force Research Laboratory

History
- Retired: 2010

The SkyTote is an unmanned aerial vehicle (UAV), tail-sitter Vertical Take-Off and Landing (VTOL)-fixed wing hybrid plane, which attains the advantages of both airplane designs (respectively VTOL takeoff capability and decreased energy usage). In order to control the vehicle when transitioning between vertical take-off to forward flight, an adaptive neural network controller was designed by Guided Systems Technologies and used on the vehicle. The vehicle was developed by AeroVironment, under a contract given by the Air Force Research Laboratory, and its primary purpose is cargo-delivery.

The SkyTote is special as it features a fly-by-wire system with remote control.

As of August 2010, the SkyTote appears as a past product on the company websites, not as a current.

== See also ==
- NASA Puffin; a similar vehicle
