= AeroVironment Wasp III =

Unmanned aerial vehicle (UAV) developed for United States Air Force special forces

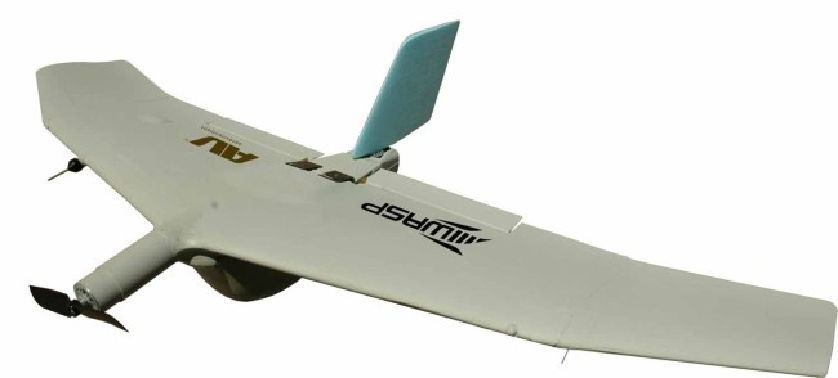

General information
- Type: Miniature UAV
- National origin: United States
- Manufacturer: AeroVironment Inc.
- Status: In service
- Primary user: United States Air Force

History
- Introduction date: 2007

The AeroVironment Wasp III Small Unmanned Aircraft System is a miniature UAV developed for United States Air Force special operations to provide a small, light-weight vehicle to provide beyond-line-of-sight situation awareness. The aircraft is equipped with two on-board cameras to provide real-time intelligence to its operators. It is also equipped with GPS and an Inertial Navigation System enabling it to operate autonomously from takeoff to recovery. It was designed by AeroVironment Inc., and was first added to the Air Force inventory in 2007. There are two Wasp variants: the traditional version that lands on land ("Terra Wasp"), and a version that lands into the sea or fresh water ("Aqua Wasp"). The Air Force accepted the Wasp AE in late May 2012, and the U.S. Marine Corps revealed in January 2013 that they had ordered the Wasp AE. The Wasp AE is designated as the RQ-12A.

== Design and development ==
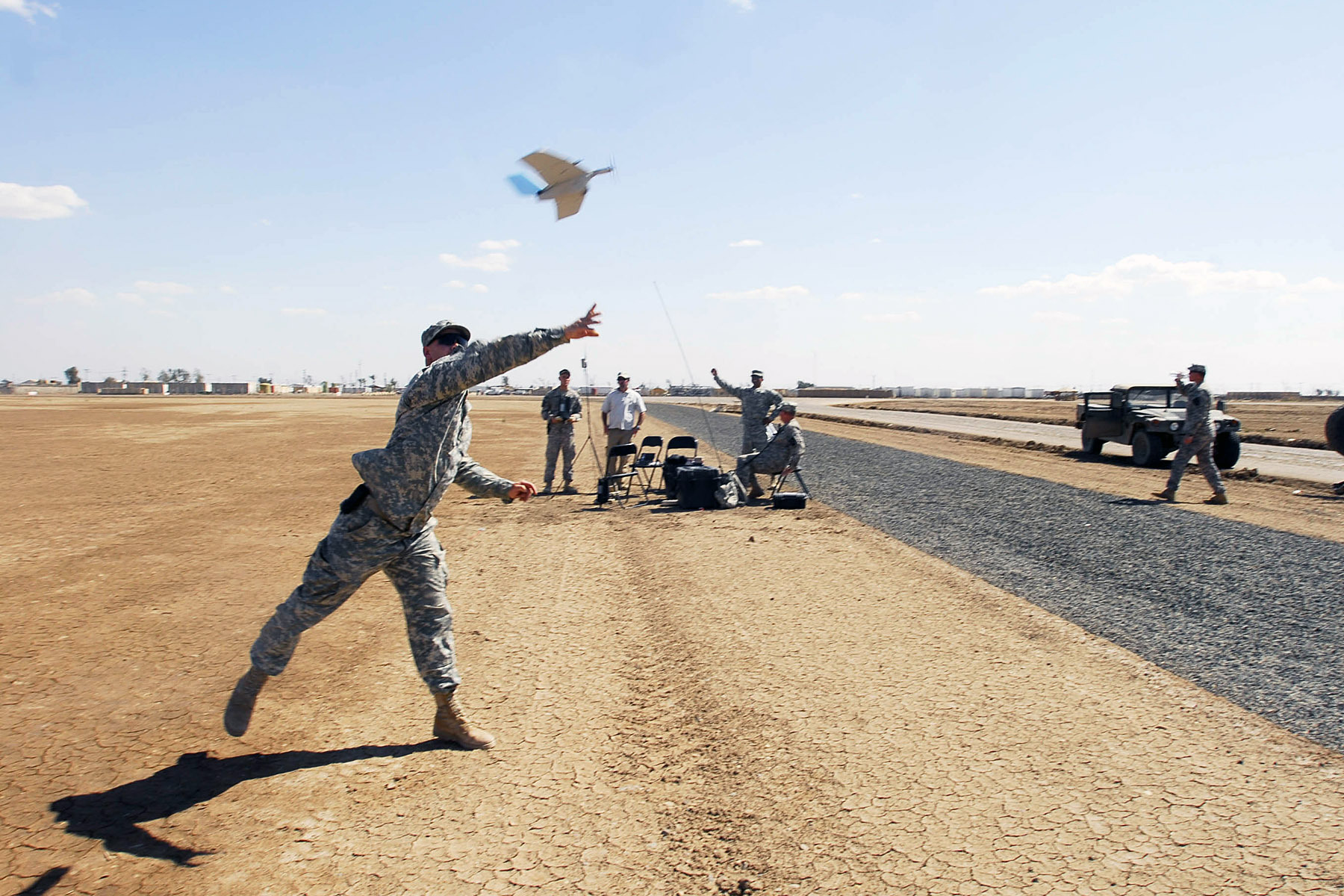
A US Army Staff Sergeant throwing a Wasp III.

The Wasp III is the result of a multi-year joint development effort between AeroVironment and the Defense Advanced Research Projects Agency (DARPA) to create a small, portable, reliable, and rugged unmanned aerial platform designed for front-line day or night reconnaissance and surveillance. The Wasp weighs only 430 g (0.95 lb), is 16 in (38 cm) long, and has a wingspan of 29 in (72 cm); it can be broken down and re-assembled to fit in a backpack. It can be controlled manually or programmed for GPS-based autonomous navigation and can carry interchangeable targeting payload modules, including forward and side-looking infrared and color cameras that transmit streaming video directly to the hand-held ground controller, the same controller used for the larger RQ-11B Raven and RQ-20 Puma. The aircraft can fly for 45 minutes out to 5 km (3.1 mi) at an altitude of 1,000 ft (300 m) with a top speed of 40–65 km/h (25–40 mph). The Air Force Special Operations Command (AFSOC) selected the Wasp III for the Battlefield Air Targeting Micro Air Vehicle (BATMAV) program in December 2006 to allow battlefield airmen to look for enemy targets beyond their line of sight; AFSOC began testing the tiny UAV in October 2007 and approved full-rate production in January 2008. In November 2007, the U.S. Marine Corps also awarded AeroVironment a $19.3 million contract to deliver Wasp III systems under the Air Force BATMAV contract to equip Marines at platoon level, complementing Raven UAVs deployed at company and battalion levels.

In May 2012, AeroVironment introduced the Wasp AE, an improved version of the Wasp air vehicle that can land on ground or water. Although it is heavier at 2.8 lb (1.3 kg), it has 20 percent greater endurance and incorporates a miniature gimbal that gives operators both color and infrared video imagery from a single sensor package. Following the Air Force, the Marine Corps ordered the Wasp AE in September 2012.

In January 2023, the U.S. Marine Corps revealed they had retired the RQ-12A Wasp IV SUAS in favor of the Skydio X2D, a vertical take-off and landing UAV that is easier to launch and recover and can provide a hover-and-stare surveillance capability.

== Operators ==
Australia

- Australian Army

Czech Republic

- Czech Army

France

- French Navy

Sweden

- Swedish Air Force
- Swedish Army
- Swedish Navy

United States

- United States Air Force

Spain

- Spanish Air Force

United Kingdom

- Royal Navy

Bangladesh

- Bangladesh Army

=== Former operators ===
United States

- United States Marine Corps

== Specifications ==
General characteristics

- Crew: none
- Length: 1 ft 3.0 in (0.38 m)
- Wingspan: 2 ft 4.50 in (0.723 m)
- Empty weight: 0.95 lb (0.430 kg) (Land version)
- Gross weight: 14.4 lb (6.53 kg)
- Powerplant: 1 × Electric motor, rechargeable lithium ion batteries

Performance

- Maximum speed: 40 mph (65 km/h, 35 kn)
- Cruise speed: 25–40 mph (40–65 km/h, 22–35 kn)
- Range: 3.1 mi (5.0 km, 2.7 nmi)
- Endurance: 45 minutes
- Service ceiling: 50–1,000 ft (15–333 m) AGL; 10,000 ft (3,333 m) MSL

Avionics
High resolution, day/night cameras with digital image stabilization and digital pan/tilt/zoom

== See also ==
- Unmanned aerial vehicle
- Unmanned Combat Air Vehicle

Related lists

- List of unmanned aerial vehicles
- List of active United States military aircraft
