= AeroVironment T-20 =

Type of aircraft

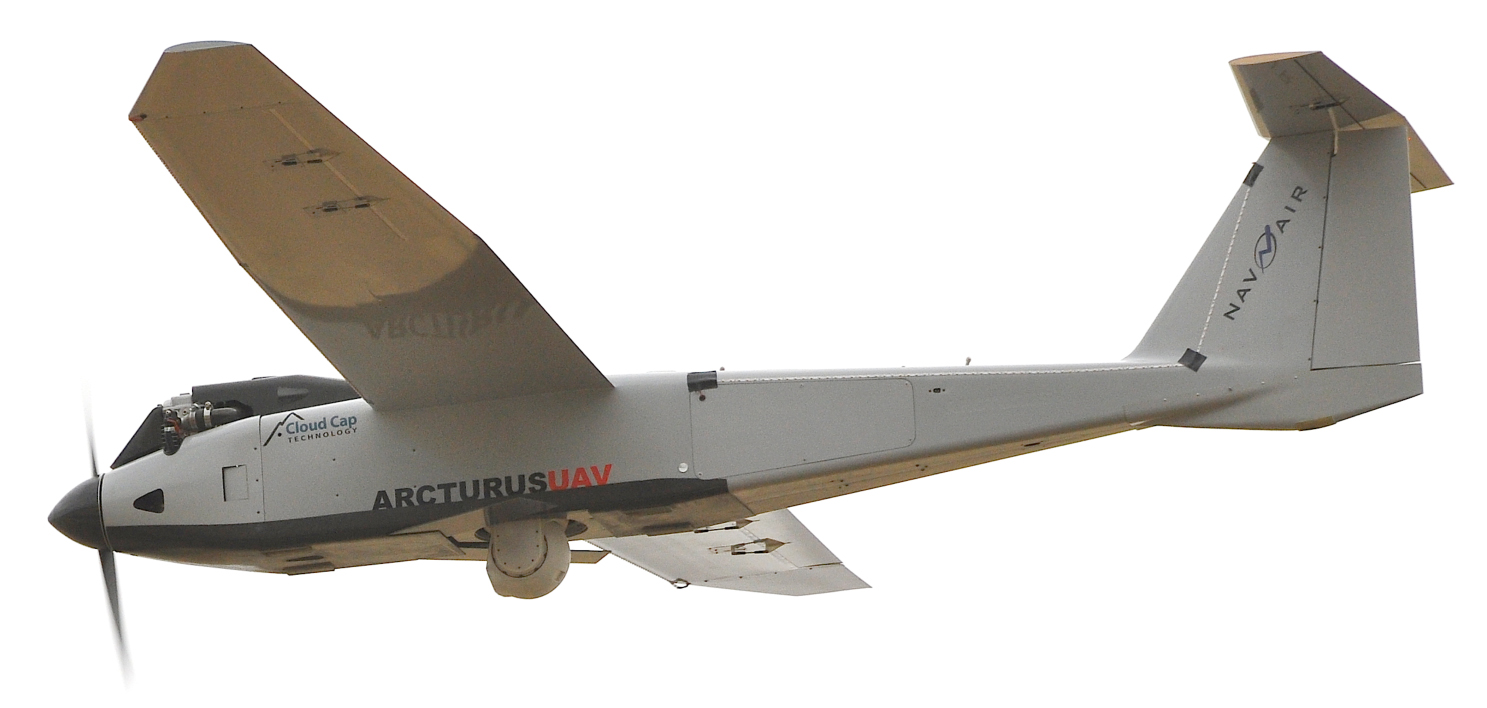
- T-20 with ISR camera extended Camp Roberts, California

General information
- Type: Runway independent tactical reconnaissance UAV
- Manufacturer: AeroVironment
- Primary users: US military Ukraine military Taiwan CGA
- Number built: 200 + Delivered/more Planned

History
- Introduction date: 2009
- First flight: January 28, 2009, Edwards Air Force Base

The AeroVironment T-20 unmanned aerial vehicle (UAV) (formerly Arcturus T-20) is a medium range, composite aircraft capable of internal and external payloads. Launched from a portable catapult, it can be recovered with a shipboard landing system, or belly land on unimproved surfaces. The T-20 carries a retractable gimbal-mounted, digitally stabilized, electro-optical/infrared (EO/IR) camera that relays video in real time via a C-band LOS data link to the ground control station (GCS). Powered by a 4-stroke, fuel injected gasoline engine, the aircraft burns 2 lb (910 g) of fuel per hour at cruise. AeroVironment, Inc. acquired Arcturus UAV, the original developer of JUMP 20 and T-20 on February 22, 2021.

== Development ==
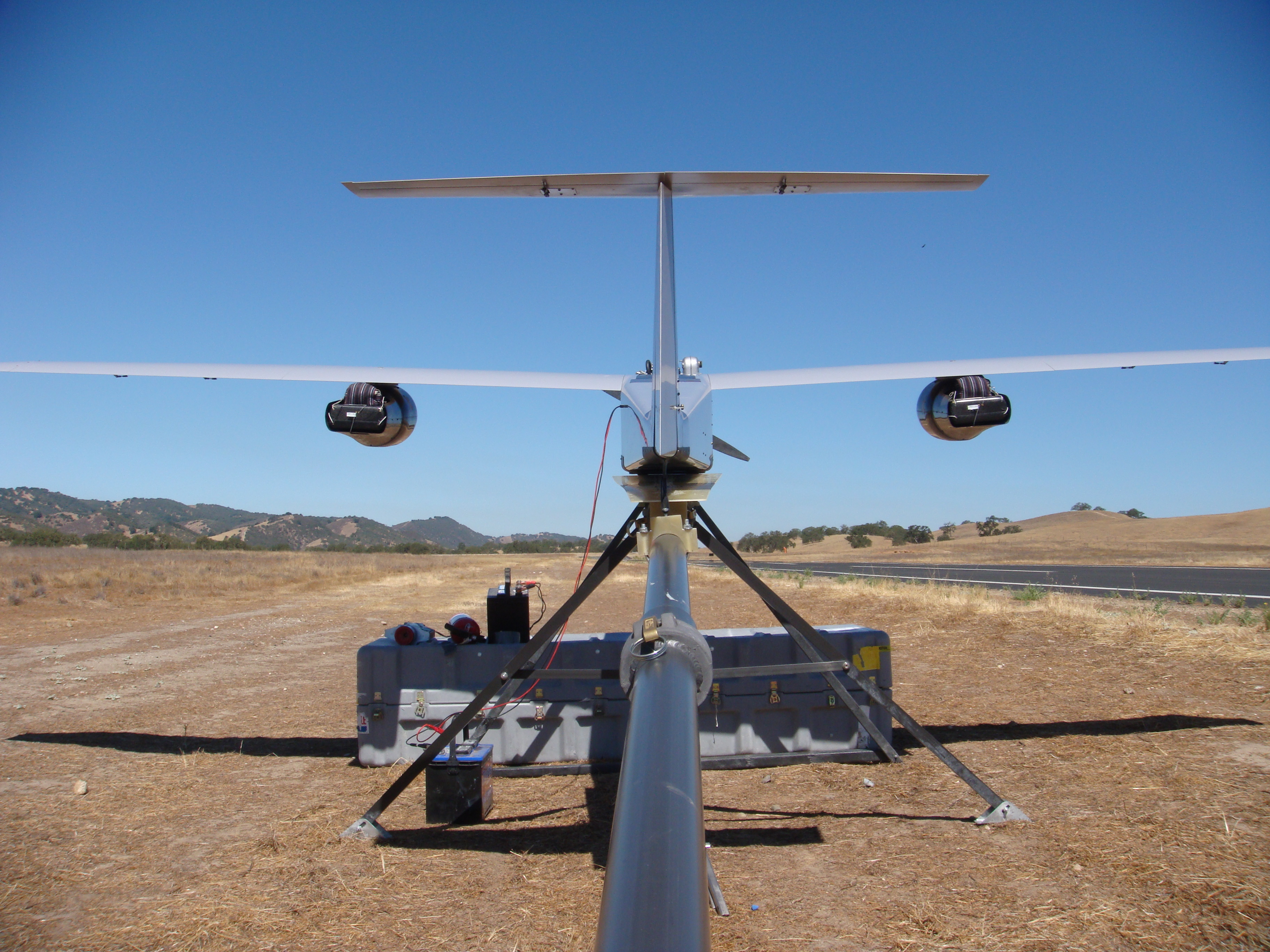
T-20 ready to launch at Camp Roberts, California

JUMP 20 variant lands on USS San Antonio.

The T-20 was developed in 2009 in Rohnert Park, California as an Intelligence, Surveillance and Reconnaissance platform with payload capacity for a gimbal camera, and wing mounted drop pods. Flight testing of the prototype T-20 was completed at Edwards Air Force Base in February 2009. The first air drop test was completed in August 2009 at Camp Roberts California with payloads provided by the Naval Postgraduate School. October 2009 The T-20 flew air drops at the 2009 Precision Airdrop Technology Conference and Demonstration (PATCAD) at Yuma Proving Ground in support of the Naval Postgraduate School Snowflake guided para foil.

In March 2012, the Naval Air Systems Command (NAVAIR) included the T-20 UAV in multi-award IDIQ contract N00019-12-D-0010 for ISR Services.

In California on October 24, 2012, the T-20 made aviation history as the first unmanned aerial vehicle to detect and avoid a general aviation manned aircraft using an ADS-B transponder. The event was sponsored by the Cascade Chapter of AUVSI.

In August 2013, the T-20 flew to an altitude of 23,500 feet (7,200 m) with no special modifications. The previous altitude record for the T-20 was 15,000 feet (4,600 m). The aircraft flew for eight hours before landing.

The T-20 and JUMP 20 are used extensively with the Mexican Navy. The T-20 is also operated by the Turkish government.

== Design ==
The T-20 does not require an airfield to operate and lands on dirt, grass, desert, or gravel roads. The internal payload bay (11 in × 11 in × 36 in or 28 cm × 28 cm × 91 cm) allows for sensor arrays to be pre-assembled on payload pallets that attach from the bottom of the aircraft. The T-20 system includes three aircraft, ground control station, portable launcher, and support trailer for equipment and personnel. The airframe is entirely composite with complex wet wings tested to stresses of 10 g (98 m/s^{2}).

== Operational history ==
On 18 August 2022, the U.S. Army selected the AeroVironment Jump 20, the vertical takeoff and landing version of the T-20, as part of the first increment of the Future Tactical Unmanned Aircraft System (FTUAS). This was part of an effort started in 2018 to replace the RQ-7 Shadow with a drone that was runway independent, had a lower acoustic signature and had lower equipment requirements to transport. The Army awarded AeroVironment an $8 million contract to provide one Jump 20 system, which consists of six air vehicles, ground data terminals and ground control stations for one brigade combat team; up to seven more systems could be acquired. Increment one of the FTUAS was meant to immediately meet operational units' needs, while increment two would rely on a separate competitive acquisition. The Army received the first system on 12 September 2022. AeroVironment was eliminated from the second increment of the FTUAS program in May 2023.

On 24 February 2023, one year since the start of the 2022 Russian invasion of Ukraine, the Jump 20 was included in an American aid package for Ukraine. As part of the Ukraine Security Assistance Initiative (USAI), it will be bought from the manufacturer and be delivered in late spring or later.

In 2023 a JUMP 20 system was delivered to the Coast Guard Administration (Taiwan).

== Variants ==
Variations of the T-20 are the Block I (Carburettor) and Block II (Fuel Injected).

There is also a VTOL version known as JUMP 20, which participated in FTUAS program of US Army and is currently deployed within the Taiwanese CGA.

== Specifications ==
Data from AeroVironment T-20 UAV

General characteristics

- Crew: 2 man ground crew
- Length: 9 ft 5 in (2.9 m)
- Wingspan: 17 ft 6 in (5.3 m)
- Height: 3 ft 0 in (1.0 m)
- Empty weight: 110 lb (50 kg)
- Gross weight: 185 lb (84 kg)
- Powerplant: 1 × 1 Aviation Gasoline Avgas 110 LL 4 stroke internal combustion, 190cc , 10 hp (7.5 kW)

Performance

- Maximum speed: 86 mph (139 km/h, 75 kn)
- Cruise speed: 69 mph (111 km/h, 60 kn)
- Range: 115 mi (185 km, 100 nmi) range from nearest transmitter connected to operator
- Endurance: 24+ hours
- Service ceiling: 15,000 ft (4,600 m) (rated); 25,000 ft (7,600 m) (proven)

== See also ==
- AeroVironment RQ-20 Puma
- Unmanned Aerial Vehicle
- Unmanned combat aerial vehicle

Aircraft of comparable role, configuration, and era

- AAI RQ-7 Shadow
- Boeing Insitu RQ-21 Blackjack
- Boeing Insitu ScanEagle

Related lists

- List of active United States military aircraft
