= AeroVironment =

American unmanned aerial vehicle manufacturer

AeroVironment, Inc.
- Type: Public
- Traded as: Nasdaq: AVAV; S&P 400 component
- Industry: Aerospace industry; Defense industry
- Founded: 1971; 55 years ago
- Founder: Paul B. MacCready Jr.
- Headquarters: Arlington, Virginia, U.S.
- Key people: Wahid Nawabi (Chairman, President & CEO)
- Revenue: ▲US$820.6 million (FY2025)
- Operating income: ▲US$146.4 million (FY2025)
- Net income: ▲US$43.6 million (FY2025)
- Total assets: ▲US$1.1 billion (FY2025)
- Total equity: ▲US$887 million (2025)
- Number of employees: 4,400 (2026)
- Website: avinc.com

AeroVironment, Inc., also known as AV, is an American defense technology company headquartered in Arlington, Virginia that designs and manufactures autonomous systems, counter-UAS systems, and space systems. The company was founded in 1971 by Paul B. MacCready Jr., a designer of human-powered aircraft. The company provides the US Department of Defense and foreign militaries with small and medium-sized drones—notably the Raven, Switchblade, Wasp, and Puma. Through its acquisition of BlueHalo in 2025, the company provides directed energy and space communications systems to U.S. and foreign militaries.

As of 2026, the company's market cap was $10B.

== History ==
On January 7, 2024, AeroVironment was sanctioned by the Chinese government due to U.S. arms sales to Taiwan. On March 4, 2025, the Chinese Ministry of Commerce placed 15 U.S. entities (including AeroVironment) on its export control list, barring the export of dual-use commodities to that business.In May 2025, AeroVironment announced it had completed its acquisition of BlueHalo, a developer of space, cyber, and counter-UAS defense technologies, from Arlington Capital Partners, in an all-stock deal with a transaction value of approximately $4.1 billion.

== Vehicles ==
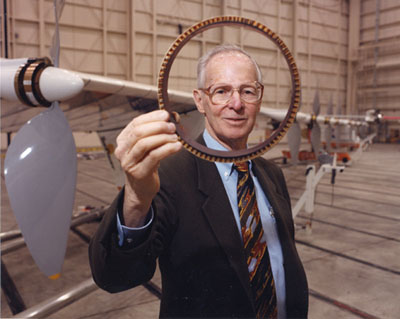
AeroVironment founder and former Chairman Paul MacCready shows a cross section of the AeroVironment/NASA Helios Prototype wing spar.

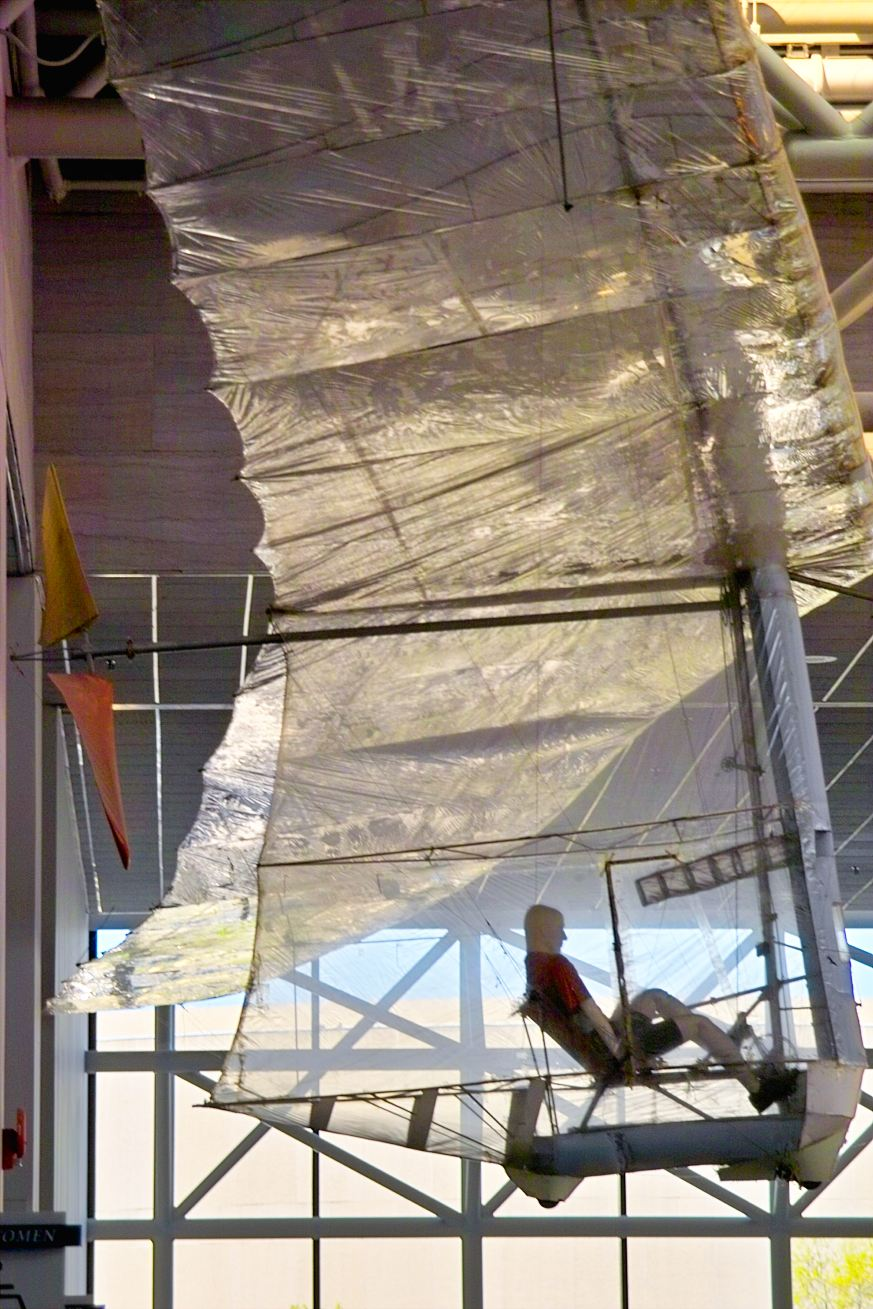
Gossamer Condor at NASM

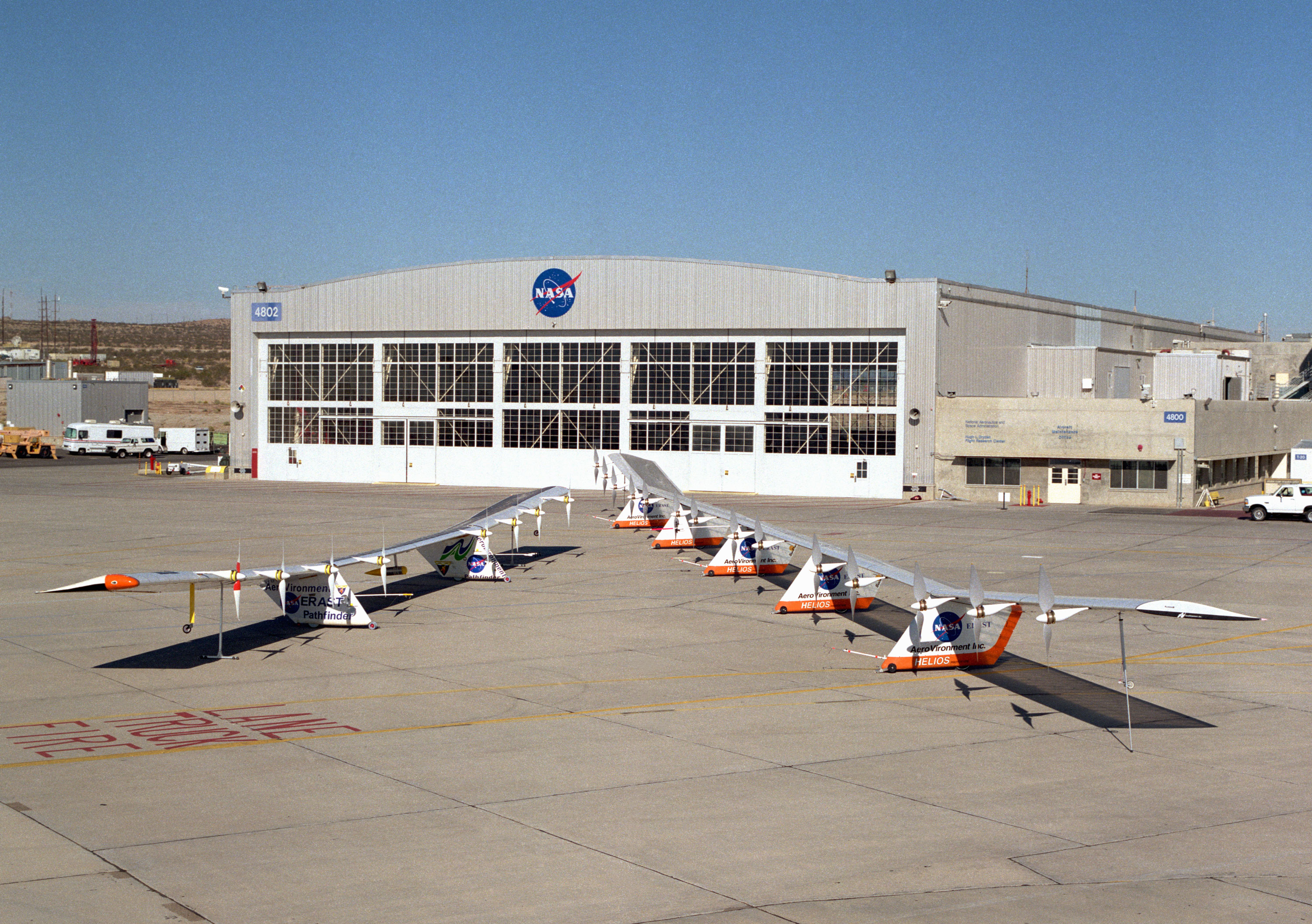
Pathfinder Plus (left) and Helios Prototype (right) on the Dryden ramp

Among the vehicles the company built are:

- Gossamer Condor – The first successful human-powered airplane. The Gossamer Condor is on display at the US National Air and Space Museum (NASM), since it won the first Kremer Prize in 1977.
- Gossamer Albatross – In 1979, this human-powered plane flew 23 miles (37 km) across the English Channel and claimed the largest prize in aviation history. Another of these planes is displayed at the National Air and Space Museum.
- Gossamer Penguin – A solar-powered variant of the Gossamer Albatross.
- Solar Challenger – This plane flew 163 miles (262 km) from Paris, France, to England on solar power.
- High Altitude Solar (HALSOL)-This solar-powered unmanned aircraft was sponsored by the CIA in the 1980s as the first unmanned solar-powered aircraft prototyped for national security missions. It was declassified and transferred to the Ballistic Missile Defense Organization (BMDO) in 1993, where it was modified as a high altitude, long endurance (HALE) UAV technology demonstrator capable of becoming weaponized to destroy boost-phase theater ballistic missiles (Boost Phase Intercept).The goal was to develop the world's first "fly forever" HALE UAV that could be configured for national security missions. The program was cancelled in 1995, due to budget reductions in the Clinton Administration at which time the aircraft, called Pathfinder, was transferred to NASA. Pathfinder flew flight test missions at NASAs Dryden Flight Research Center before the transfer.
- NASA Pathfinder and Pathfinder Plus – This unmanned plane, built by AeroVironment as a part of the NASA Environmental Research Aircraft and Sensor Technology (ERAST) Program, demonstrated that an airplane could stay aloft for extended periods fueled by solar power. After initial successes, the Pathfinder was rebuilt into the larger Pathfinder Plus, which is on display at NASM.
- NASA Centurion – The Centurion was an expansion of the Pathfinder concept, designed to achieve the ERAST Program goal of sustained flight at 100,000 feet (30,000 m) altitude.
- NASA Helios Prototype – Derived from the Centurion, this solar cell and fuel cell powered UAV set a world record for flight at 96,863 feet (29,524 m). It was intended to be the prototype for the production Helios aircraft, envisioned as an "atmospheric satellite". The ERAST program was terminated in 2003, and as of 2008, Helios has not entered production. In actuality, it has been reborn in the form of the Global Observer UAS, currently in development under a Joint Concept Technology Demonstration led by United States Special Operations Command (USSOCOM]). The key technology shift was switching from solar power to liquid hydrogen power.
- Global Observer – The Los Angeles Times reported first flight of Global Observer in the Mojave Desert in January, 2011. The aircraft was powered by hydrogen. It appears to have 4 motors with twin-bladed props, a 175-foot (53 m) wingspan, 65,000-foot (20,000 m) maximum altitude, airspeed greater than 120 mph (190 km/h), and 5 to 7 day maximum flight duration.
- Sunraycer – This solar-powered car won the first world's first solar car race in Australia in 1987. The next fastest car finished two days later. This car is at the Smithsonian National Museum of American History.
- GM Impact – This was an electric car, developed as a prototype for a mass-production consumer car.
- RQ-11 Raven – a small military UAV. It is hand launched with a wingspan of 4.5 feet (1.4 m) and a weight of 4.2 pounds (1.9 kg), providing color and infrared video to its handheld ground control and remote viewing stations. Over 9,000 Ravens had been delivered or were on order as of June 2008.
- Wasp III – a miniature, hand-launched UAV that provides aerial observation at line-of-sight ranges up to 3.1 miles (5.0 km). In 2007, the Wasp was selected by the US Air Force as the choice for their BATMAV Program. As of 2008, over 1,000 Wasp aircraft had been delivered.
- RQ-20 Puma – a small lightweight, battery powered, hand-launched production UAV that provides aerial observation at line-of-sight ranges up to 6.2 miles (10.0 km). Puma's avionics enable autonomous flight via GPS navigation. It was designed to demonstrate advanced propulsion technologies. It flew in June 2007 for five hours, powered by an onboard "fuel cell battery hybrid energy storage system". A flight in November 2007 lasted more than seven hours. On July 2, 2008, USSOCOM selected the Puma AE variant as its All Environment Capable Variant (AECV) solution.
- Nano Hummingbird – Announced in 2011, a hummingbird look-alike drone equipped with a camera, it could fly at speeds of up to 11 miles (18 km) per hour. It could climb and descend vertically, fly sideways, forward and backward, as well as rotate clockwise and counter-clockwise by remote control for about eight minutes.
- SkyTote – a vertical take-off and landing (VTOL)-fixed wing hybrid UAV, which offered VTOL takeoff capability and decreased energy usage.
- Switchblade – A man-portable family of electrically powered loitering munition for field use. It is deployed in two configurations, the 300 for attacking personnel and the 600 for attacking armor.
- FQM-151 Pointer
- RQ-14 Dragon Eye
- Puma LE (Long Endurance)
- VAPOR Helicopter
- Shrike – quadrocopter drone designed for "perch and stare" surveillance, weighs 5 lb (2.27 kg) with a 40 minute endurance while hovering or can land and transmit for several hours.
- Snipe – a quadrotor design small enough to be deployed by an individual to collect surveillance. It weighs 5 oz (0.14 kg), can reach speeds of 20 mph (32 km/h) with a range of more than 0.6 mi (0.97 km). It has flight times of 15 minutes, can withstand winds of 15 mph (24 km/h), and is equipped with EO/IR. It is low light-capable and includes long-wave infrared sensors to take photos or video in day or night conditions. In May 2017, the first 20 Snipes were delivered to an undisclosed U.S. military customer.
- Quantix – drone, 40 km range, 45 min flight time, 2.3 kg weight, controlled via encrypted radio, automated, programmed autonomous flights possible, multifunctional camera.
- Red Dragon – One-way attack drone designed for autonomous strike, weighs 45 lb (20 kg) and has a range of 250 mi (400 km). It is equipped with AI that uses visual for navigation and automatic target recognition to counter jamming.

== Programs ==
As of 2007, AeroVironment held a five-year, $4.7 million IDIQ (indefinite-delivery, indefinite-quantity) contract from the U.S. Air Force Research Laboratory to develop UAV propulsion technologies. The contract also provided for specific tasks such as integration of solar cells into aircraft wings, electric motor efficiency improvement, and hydrogen storage systems.

In 2023, Israel submitted a request to the US Department of Defense for 200 Switchblade 600 attack drones. As of 7 November, it is unclear whether the request has been approved.

Following Russia's 2022 invasion of Ukraine, the United States supplied the Armed Forces of Ukraine with more than 700 Switchblade 300 loitering munitions as part of military aid packages announced in March and April 2022. The larger, anti-armor Switchblade 600 followed after additional testing and was first used in combat in early 2023.

In 2026, Joint Interagency Task Force 401 awarded AeroVironment a $500 million sole-source IDIQ contract supporting the U.S. Department of War's "Domestic Shield" initiative to protect domestic critical infrastructure from drone threats. Under the contract, the task force exercised an order worth $80.5 million for AeroVironment's Titan-MS multi-sensor counter-UAS system, following an earlier Titan system purchase by the task force.

== Directed energy ==
Following AeroVironment's 2025 acquisition of BlueHalo, the company develops directed-energy weapons under the LOCUST high-energy laser (HEL) brand. In October 2025, it demonstrated a palletized LOCUST laser system, the P-HEL, aboard the aircraft carrier USS George H.W. Bush (CVN-77) in a live-fire test conducted with the U.S. Navy and the Army's Rapid Capabilities and Critical Technologies Office, tracking and neutralizing multiple drone targets from the moving ship. In March 2026, LOCUST was tested at White Sands Missile Range in coordination with Joint Interagency Task Force 401 and the Federal Aviation Administration, demonstrating safe operation in complex national airspace and supporting a subsequent agreement between the Department of War and the FAA validating the system for domestic counter-drone use.

== HAPSMobile ==
HAPSMobile is a subsidiary of SoftBank planning to operate High Altitude Platform Station (HAPS) networks, with AeroVironment as a minority owner. HAPSMobile develops the Hawk30 solar-powered unmanned aircraft for stratospheric telecommunications, and has a strategic relationship with Loon LLC, a subsidiary of Google's parent Alphabet Inc.

== Subsidiaries ==
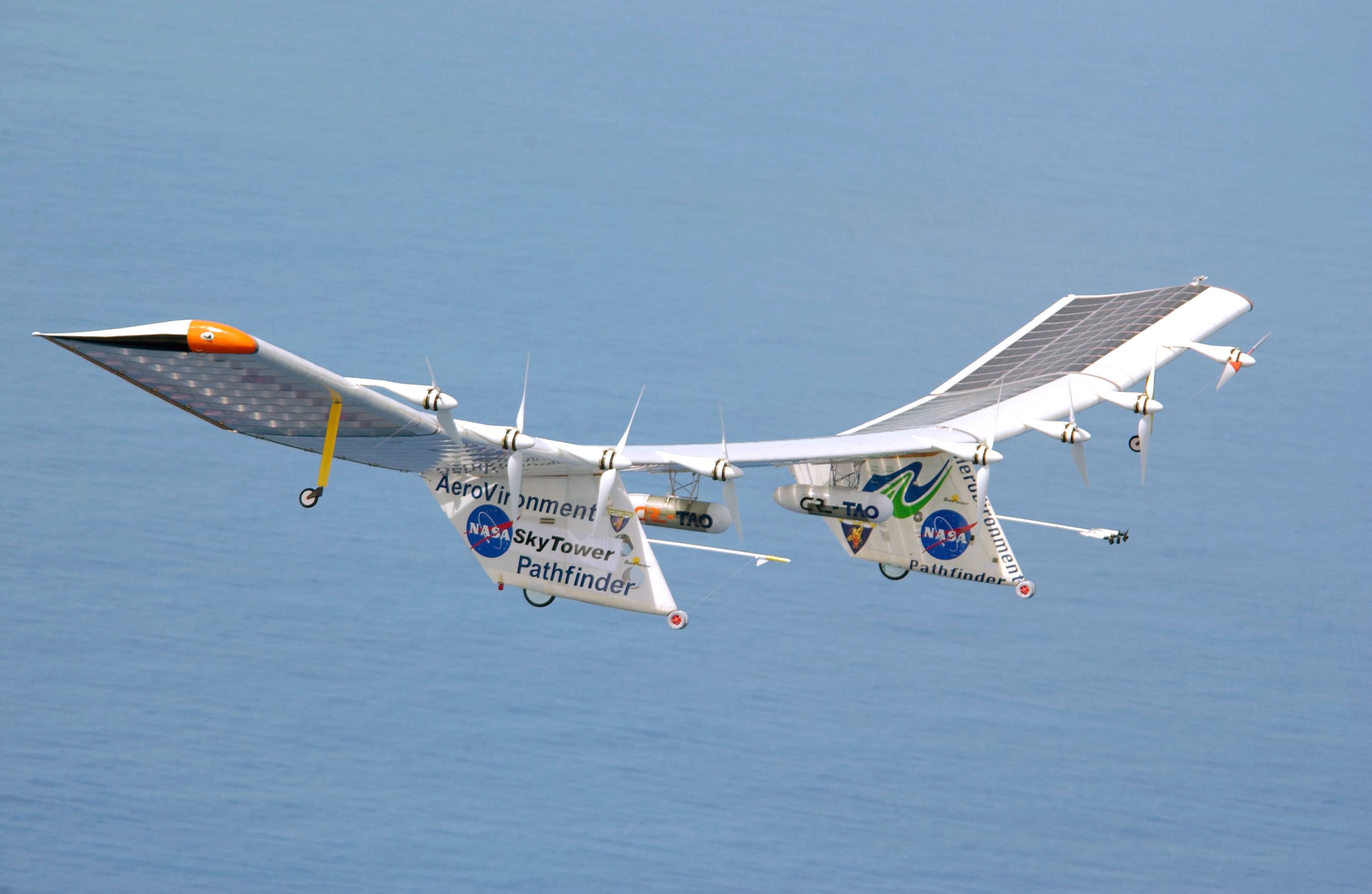
Pathfinder Plus in flight over Hawaii, June 2002, equipped with Skytower communications equipment

AeroVironment owns Skytower, Inc., which was formed in 2000 to develop the technologies and government approvals to use high altitude UAVs as "atmospheric satellites", or high altitude communications relay platforms.

In July 2002, the NASA/AeroVironment UAV Pathfinder Plus carried commercial communications relay equipment developed by Skytower to test using the aircraft as an "atmospheric satellite". Skytower, in partnership with NASA and the Japan Ministry of Telecommunications used the aircraft to transmit both an HDTV signal as well as an IMT-2000 wireless communications signal from 65,000 ft (20,000 m). It was the equivalent of a 12 mi (19 km) tall transmitter tower. Because of the aircraft's high angle, the transmission utilized only one watt of power, or 1/10,000 that required by a terrestrial tower to provide the same signal. According to SkyTower's Stuart Hindle, "SkyTower platforms are basically geostationary satellites without the time delay." Hindle said that such platforms flying in the stratosphere, as opposed to actual satellites, can achieve much higher levels of frequency use. "A single SkyTower platform can provide over 1,000 times the fixed broadband local access capacity of a geostationary satellite using the same frequency band, on a bytes per second per square mile basis."

In January 2021, the company acquired Arcturus UAV, the manufacturer of the Arcturus T-20 UAV for US$405m.
