= AeroVironment RQ-14 Dragon Eye =

American unmanned aircraft system

RQ-14 Dragon Eye
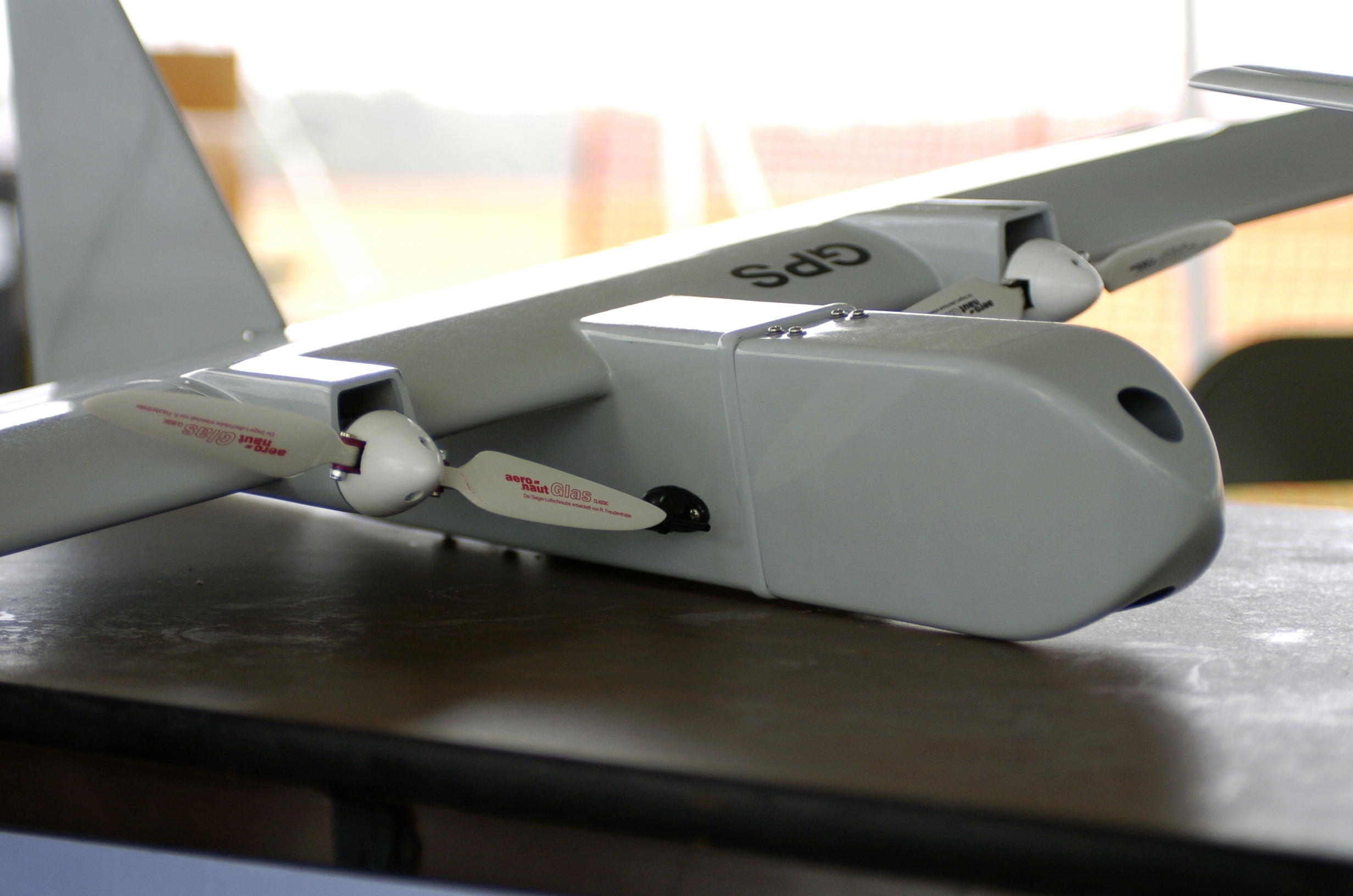

General information
- Type: Remote controlled UAV
- Manufacturer: AeroVironment
- Primary user: United States Marine Corps

History
- Introduction date: Mid-2002
- First flight: June 2001

The AeroVironment RQ-14 Dragon Eye is a small reconnaissance miniature UAV developed by the Naval Research Laboratory and the Marine Corps Warfighting Laboratory for use by the United States Marine Corps. It was designed to provide reconnaissance, surveillance, and target acquisition (RSTA) for the USMC company, platoon, and squad levels. It can provide this to around 10 kilometres (5.4 nmi) in its vicinity.

== Design and development ==
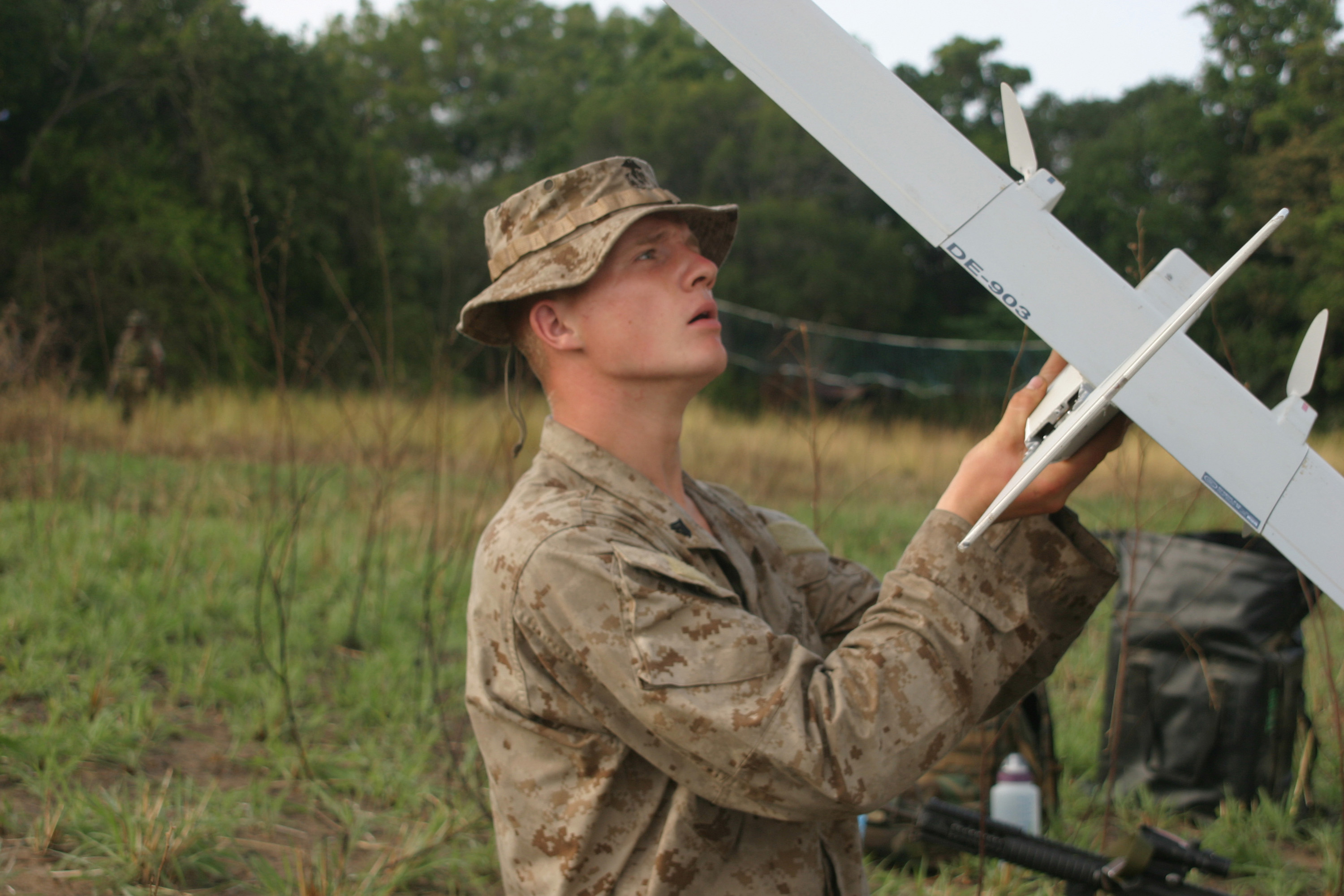
A marine checks a DE-903 UAV

It is a tailless design with a rectangular wing and twin props. It is designed to fit into a backpack, with a weight of 5 pounds (2.3 kilograms) and a span of 3 feet 9 inches (1.14 meters). It can be launched by hand or using a store-bought bungee cord. It also uses a break-apart system to increase durability—parts of the plane break apart instead of shattering and can be reattached later or replaced with new parts. It has a GPS-INS-based waypoint navigation system.

The operator monitors Dragon Eye operation through "video goggles" connected to a laptop computer. The control system weighs about 12 pounds (5.4 kilograms).

The Dragon Eye aircraft is used primarily for scouting urban areas, and is especially useful in urban assaults. Its camera, when used with a trained Marine, can be used to spot enemies without alerting them to the UAV's presence.

The production contract for Dragon Eye was awarded to AeroVironment in 2003, and over 1000 aircraft were built before the Marines switched over to another UCAV of AeroVironment (RQ-11 Raven B) for the remainder of the Dragon Eye production contract.

The Dragon Eye has been used in Iraq, post-invasion, from 2003–present.

== General characteristics ==
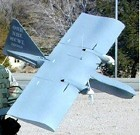
A Dragon Eye UAV

Data from Dragon Eye data sheet

General characteristics

- Length: 3 ft (0.91 m)
- Wingspan: 3.75 ft (1.14 m)
- Gross weight: 5.9 lb (2.7 kg)

Performance

- Cruise speed: 40 mph (64 km/h, 35 kn)
- Range: 3.1 mi (5.0 km, 2.7 nmi)
- Endurance: 45-60 minutes
- Service ceiling: 300–500 ft (91–152 m)
- Transmission range: 6.2 mi (10.0 km)
