= AeroVironment RQ-20 Puma =

American unmanned aircraft system

RQ-20 Puma
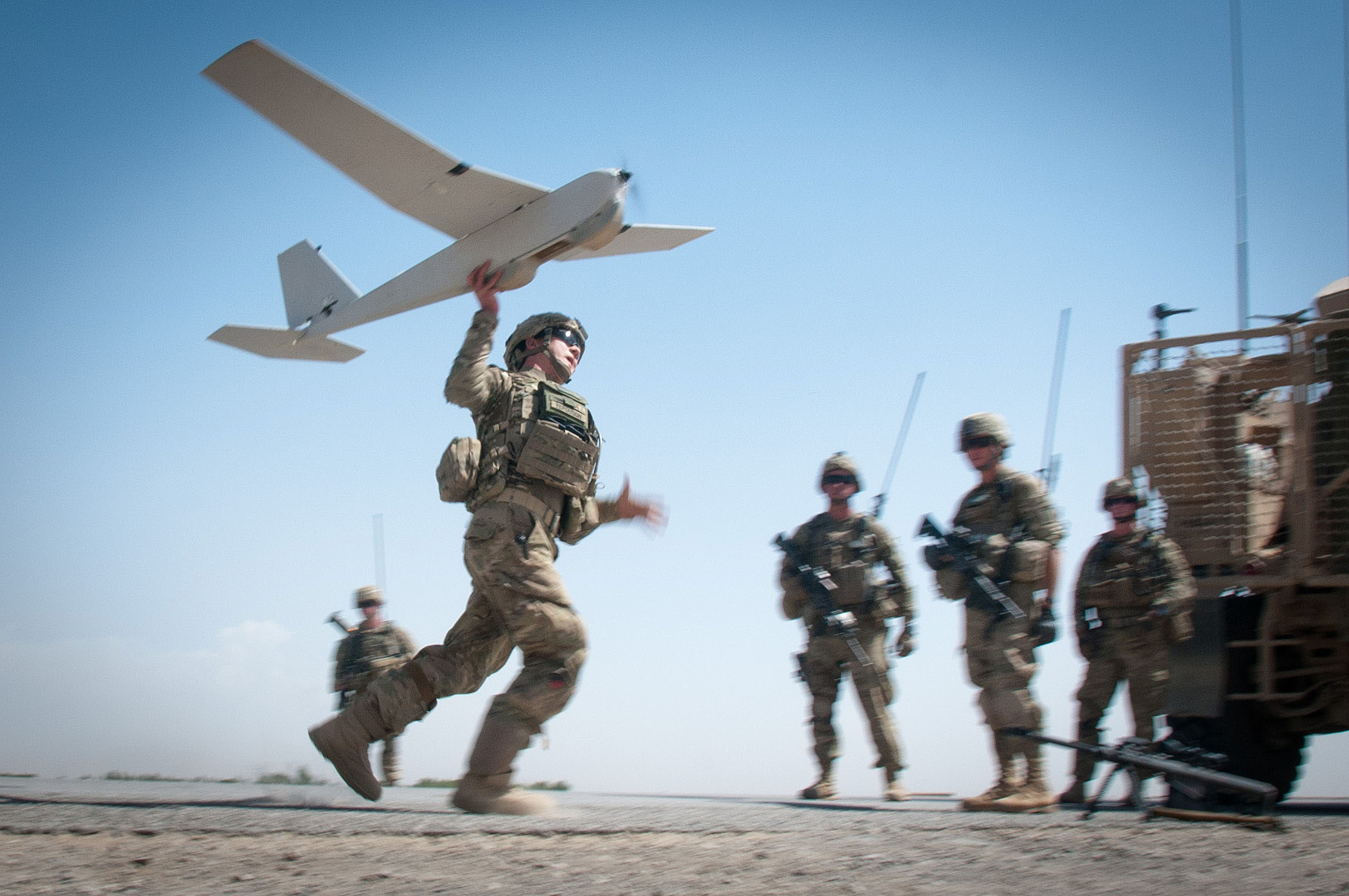
- AeroVironment RQ-20 Puma and US soldiers

General information
- Type: Miniature UAV
- Manufacturer: AeroVironment
- Primary users: United States Army United States Marine Corps; United States Air Force; Albanian Air Force
- Number built: + 1,000

History
- Introduction date: 2008
- First flight: 2007

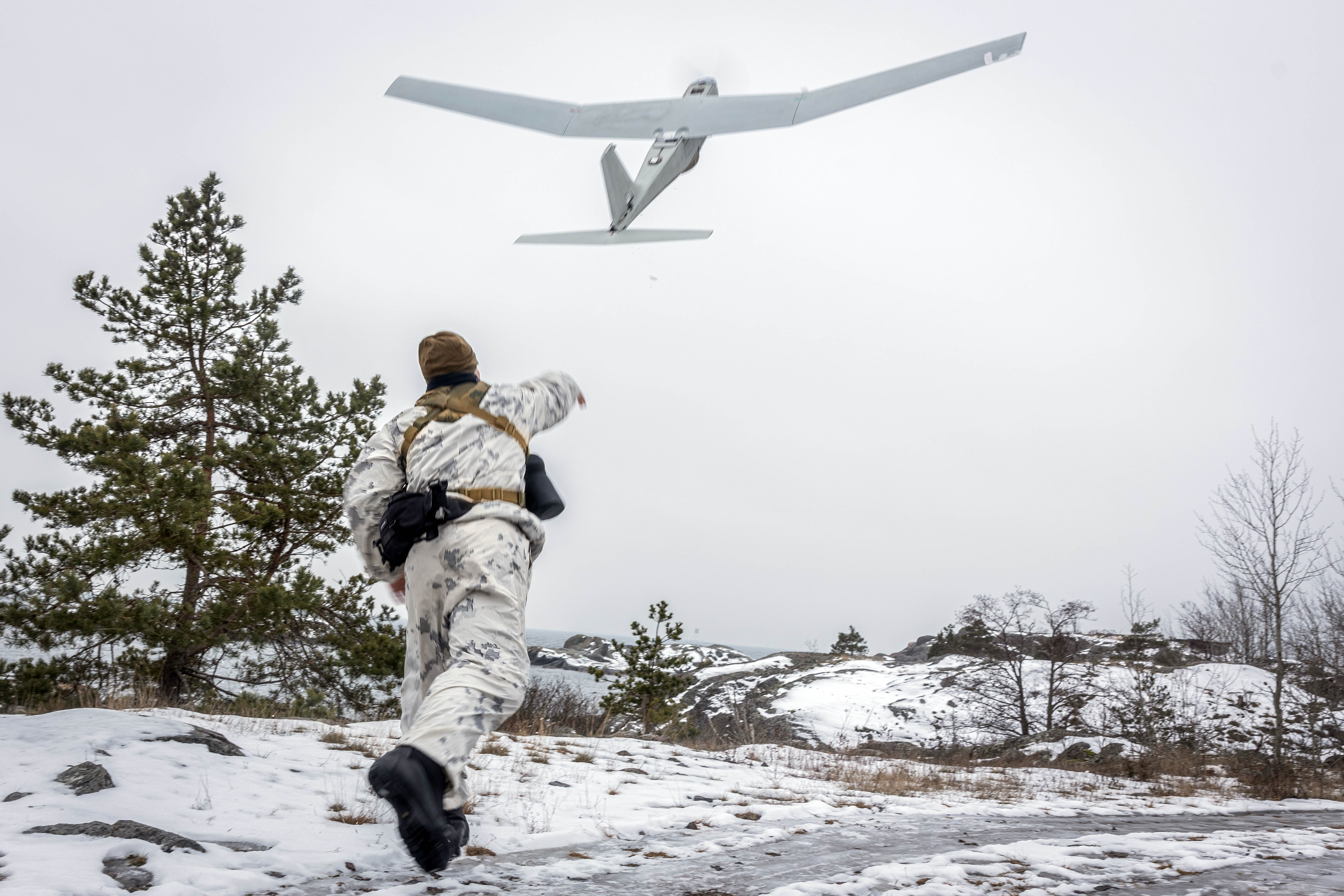
Puma Launch: Navy Petty Officer 1st Class Kepono Gowan launches an RQ-20 Puma unmanned aircraft system during Operation Baltic Sentry in southern Finland, Feb. 24, 2025.

The AeroVironment RQ-20 Puma is an American unmanned aircraft system which is small, battery powered, and hand-launched. Its primary mission is surveillance and intelligence gathering using an electro-optical and infrared camera. It is produced by AeroVironment.

== Configuration ==
Each military RQ-20A system has three air vehicles and two ground stations. The Puma AE can operate at temperatures ranging from −20 to 120 °F (−29 to 49 °C), wind speeds up to 25 knots (29 mph; 46 km/h), and in 1 inch (25 mm) of rain per hour. It had a reported top speed of 45 miles per hour (72 km/h; 39 kn), a range of over 10 miles (16 km) and an endurance time of more than 2 hours. The drone carries an array of sensors, including a times-fifty optical zoom, to live-stream video back to its ground station.

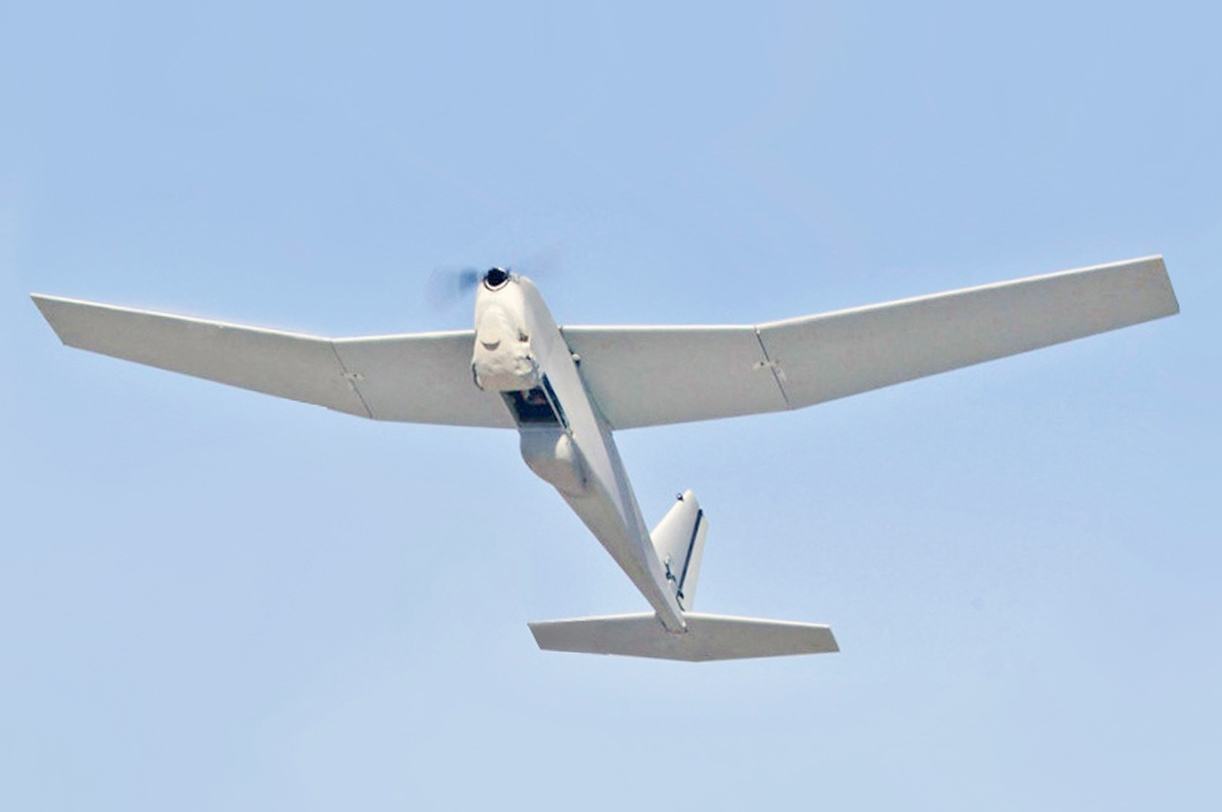
RQ-20

== History ==
In 2008, it was selected for the United States Special Operations Command. In March 2012 the United States Army ordered the Puma All Environment (AE) and designated it the RQ-20A. In April, the United States Marine Corps and United States Air Force placed a similar order for the RQ-20A.

On 26 July 2013, the Puma became one of the first unmanned aerial vehicles to be granted certification by the Federal Aviation Administration to fly in U.S. airspace for commercial purposes.

On 8 June 2014, the Puma AE made its first flight for BP in Prudhoe Bay, Alaska, which was the first authorized unmanned commercial flight over land.

The UK tested ISR (intelligence, surveillance, and reconnaissance) packages compatible with the Puma AE on board the M80 Stiletto trials ship in November 2014. As of 2024, there were nine qualified Puma teams with 700 Naval Air Squadron, six of which were dedicated to supporting the Royal Marines in 40 and 45 Commando.

On 20 January 2016, RQ-20 units were captured by the Turkish army from the PKK. It is suspected that the Kurdish militants were able to acquire these drones from their Syrian affiliates.

In August 2016, AeroVironment announced the U.S. Navy had tested and deployed the RQ-20B Puma aboard a Flight I Guided Missile Destroyer. The test included the company's Precision Recovery System to autonomously recover the aircraft aboard a ship. The Puma was utilized on Navy patrol craft in the Persian Gulf.

In 2018, commercial certification followed military certification and the Congressionally-mandated opening of airspace over much of Alaska to small UAVs. Three individual Pumas were certified, with strict requirements: only one aircraft of the type was allowed to be airborne at any one time; they were not certified for clouds or icing conditions; takeoff and landing was not allowed during certain gust and wind conditions. The certification did not mention line-of-sight control. In December 2021, the United States allocated $5 million for a Puma drone for the Kurdish Peshmerga in Iraq.

On 1 April 2022, the United States announced a $300 million military aid package to Ukraine that included Puma drones, during the Russian invasion of Ukraine. Oryx reports that by 19 September 2023, Russian forces had shot down at least 10 of these drones.

== Variants ==
RQ-20A Puma
Military designation for the Puma All Environment variant.

Enhanced Puma
Upgrade of the RQ-20A Puma AE with more powerful propulsion system and new batteries that increase endurance by 75 percent to 3.5 hours, auxiliary payload bay to integrate payloads while keeping the video camera, precision navigation system with secondary GPS, and a redesigned durable fuselage with reinforced construction and improved aerodynamics. Available in early 2014.

Solar Puma
Puma AE powered by thin solar cells that increases endurance to 9 hours. Production version was planned for early 2014.

RQ-20B
Block 2 Puma AE, includes a more powerful and lighter propulsion system, lighter and stronger airframe, long endurance battery, precision inertial navigation system and improved user interface, and the new, all environment Mantis i45 gimbal sensor suite.

LRTA Puma
Puma AE upgraded with a long-range tracking antenna (LRTA) that extends range to 60 kilometers (37.28 miles). Available Spring 2018.

Puma LE (Long Endurance)
Puma with expanded battery-operated endurance to 5.5 hours, revealed in May 2019.

Puma 3 AE
Designed for maritime use, it is capable of landing on water or ground. Includes the Mantis i45 EO/IR sensor suite and extended range. Released in 2021.

== Operators ==
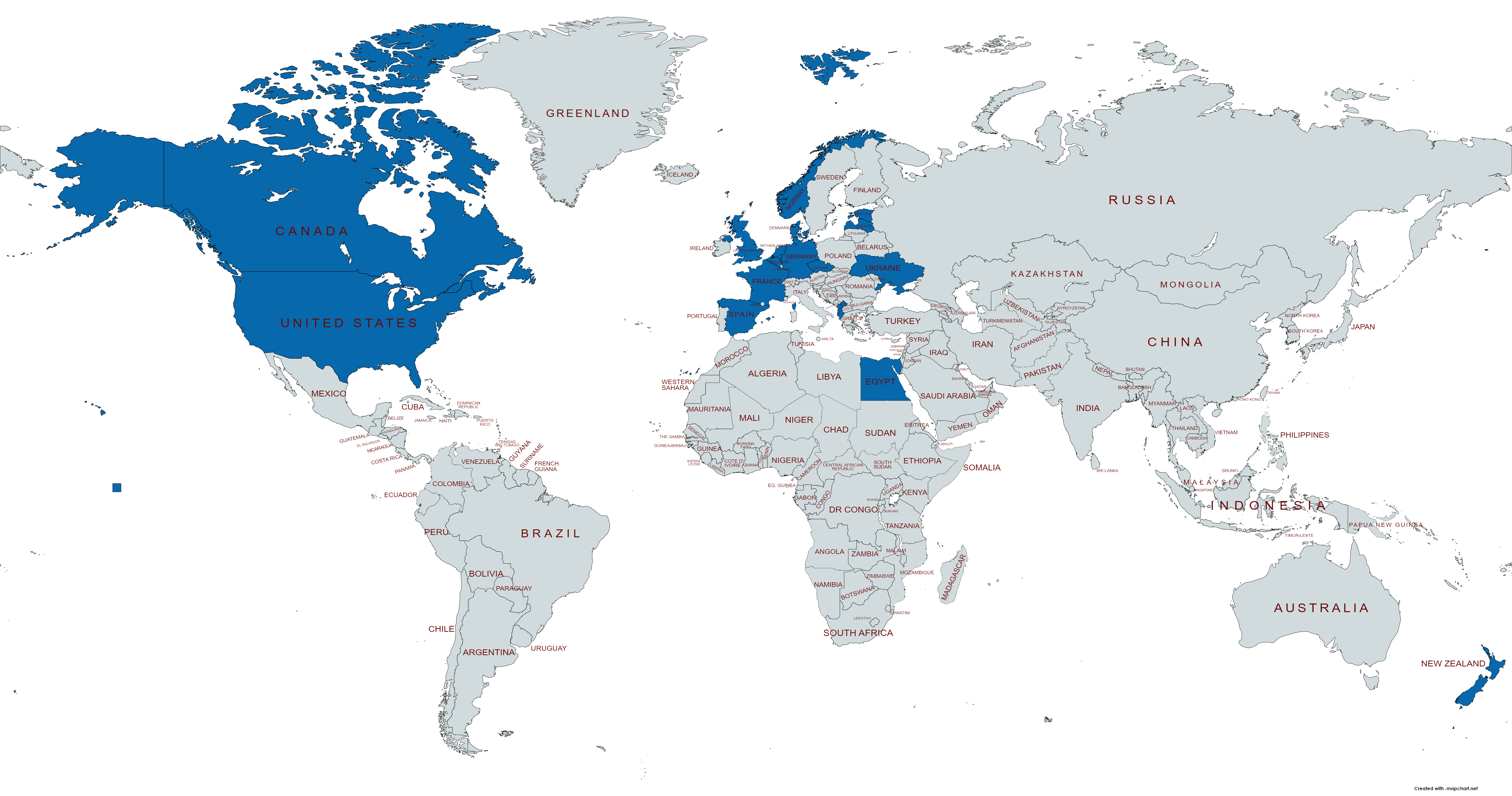
Map with RQ-20 operators in blue

Albania

- Albanian Armed Forces - 6 RQ-20B Puma Block AE were purchased through Foreign Military Sales (FMS) in 2020. The first batch was handed over in early September 2021.

Australia

- Australian Army

Belgium

- Belgian Army - Leased from the US Army in 2017

Canada

- Canadian Army - An unknown number of RQ-20A Puma are operated by the Canadian Armed Forces.
- Royal Canadian Navy - 12 aircraft used for all Kingston-class coastal defence vessels.

Costa Rica

- Air Vigilance Service - Costa Rica received a systems with total of 6 Puma AE drones as part of US Military Assistance grant

Czech Republic

- Army of the Czech Republic - One system RQ-20A Puma was purchased in 2018. In 2022 was purchased four systems Puma 3 AE.

Denmark

- Royal Danish Army - Bought Puma AE in 2012. Upgraded to Puma AE II in 2016.

Egypt

- Egyptian Army - RQ-20B Puma AE II UAVs, delivery to be completed by 2020.

Estonia

- Estonian Army - Unknown number of RQ20B Puma AE II UAVs purchased in September 2018. Delivery to be expected by March 2019.

France

- Commandos Marine - Unknown number of Puma AE UAVs purchased in 2017 followed by an additional purchase in 2020.

Germany

- German Navy - 3 RQ-20B Puma AE II systems in service.

Greece

- Hellenic Army - Unknown number of RQ20B Puma AE II UAVs purchased in June 2017. Delivered by September of the same year to special operations units.

Kosovo

- Kosovo Security Forces - Operate 4 Puma Drones

Latvia

- Latvian Army - 3 RQ-20A Puma systems

Netherlands

- Royal Marechaussee

New Zealand

- New Zealand Army - Operates a single top-end AeroVironment Puma drone.

Norway

- Norwegian Army - Bought Puma AE in 2018–2019.

Palau

- Palau Police

Philippines

- Philippine Marine Corps - Received 2 systems with total of 8 Puma AE drones as part of US Military Assistance grant.

Portugal

- Portuguese Navy - Bought Puma 3 AE in 2024.

Spain

- Spanish Army - Operates an unknown number of Puma AE.

Sweden

- Swedish Army- Bought Puma AE in 2012.

Turkey

- Turkish Army- Puma 3 AE variant in use. 30 Purchased in 2016. Produced under license by ALTOY.

United Kingdom

- Fleet Air Arm
  - 700X Naval Air Squadron

United States

- United States Special Operations Command
- United States Army – 325 systems, one per infantry company and 18 per brigade
- United States Marine Corps
- United States Navy
- United States Air Force
- National Oceanic and Atmospheric Administration

Ukraine

- Armed Forces of Ukraine
- 148th Air Assault Brigade

Kurdistan

- Peshmerga

== Specifications ==
Data from Puma AE data sheet

General characteristics

- Length: 4 ft 7 in (1.4 m)
- Wingspan: 9 ft 2 in (2.8 m)
- Max takeoff weight: 13 lb (5.9 kg)

Performance

- Maximum speed: 52 mph (83 km/h, 45 kn)
- Minimum control speed: 23 mph (37 km/h, 20 kn)
- Range: 9.3 mi (15 km, 8.1 nmi)
- Endurance: 2 hours

== See also ==
- List of unmanned aerial vehicles
