= Australian Research Centre for Aerospace Automation =

The Australian Research Centre for Aerospace Automation (ARCAA) was a research centre of the Queensland University of Technology. ARCAA conducted research into all aspects of aviation automation, with a particular research focus on autonomous technologies which support the more efficient and safer utilisation of airspace, and the development of autonomous aircraft and on-board sensor systems for a wide range of commercial applications.

== History ==
ARCAA was the brainchild of the late Professor Rod Walker from QUT's then School of Engineering Systems; QUT's Professor Jonathan Roberts (when he was at CSIRO); and Professor Peter Corke from QUT's School of Electrical Engineering and Computer Systems (when he was at CSIRO).

In 2008, QUT and CSIRO entered into a five-year research joint venture agreement for the creation of the Australian Research Centre for Aerospace Automation. The establishment of the physical Centre was co-funded through the Queensland Government’s Smart State Research Facilities Fund.

In 2013, ARCAA entered into a new phase of operations, as the joint venture between QUT and CSIRO ended. The strong research collaboration between QUT and CSIRO has continued however, especially on the flagship research project, Project ResQu.

ARCAA research interests included Unmanned aerial system topics, airspace automation and related fields. It was the co-organiser of the annual international robotics event UAV Outback Challenge since 2007.

== Recent projects ==
ARC Discovery Early Career Researcher Award (DECRA) – Developing Novel Concepts for Improved Safety in Aircraft Emergency Situations The aim of this project was to create an emergency system based on novel detection, control and planning algorithms that can be used in specific cases to improve pilot’s visual situation awareness in emergency forced landing scenarios. This work was evaluated in the context of a landing site detection and guidance problems, and proven on ARCAA's fleet of manned and unmanned aircraft.

UAS for Myrtle Rust Inspection This study examined the impacts of myrtle rust on Melaleuca quinquenervia host species across an environmental gradient. Direct impacts on the M. quinquenervia hosts were assessed using above canopy photographic techniques acquired using UAS equipped with EO cameras, as they offered a sufficient method to capture fine scale data of the forest canopy, including incidence and severity scores, as were able to fly low and slow. UAS will assist in the examination of myrtle rust impacts by allowing the evaluation of individual structure (clustering of spores on a leaf) and changes in their spatiotemporal dynamics.

UAS for Koala Population Assessment This was a comparative study of UAS equipped with thermal cameras for population count in a ground-truthed area. The purpose of the project was to assess the efficacy of UAS for rapid assessment of koala population densities.

Drone swarms for persistent operations with human operator control This project investigated control technologies for swarms of drones (UAVs) conducting tasks such as surveillance, search and rescue, and fire monitoring.

Application-based regional airspace modelling and flight plan design This project aimed to address how regional airspace can routinely accommodate UAVs operating in regional areas.

Interactive systems The Interactive Systems Group (ISG) was a research group embedded within ARCAA. The ISG conducted research into all aspects of complex human-machine systems and in particular those systems involving the command and control of heterogeneous autonomous agents. The aim of the group was to develop the concepts necessary for the safe and efficient operation of complex interacting human-machine systems in a broad range of applications.

== Past projects ==
Project ResQu This two-year project, co-funded through the Queensland Government Smart Futures Fund, Boeing Research & Technology Australia, Insitu Pacific Ltd., CSIRO and QUT undertook the safety studies and developed the automated safety technologies necessary to enable the timely approval of UA for disaster recovery, as well as routinely delivering benefits through surveys for biosecurity and resource management.

CRC PB5055 – UAVs for Plant Biosecurity The primary objective of the research was the qualitative evaluation of the use of UAS for biosecurity applications. The goal was to determine the fundamental factors pertaining to the operation of various UAS that will significantly influence how and where UAS can be effective throughout the plant biosecurity continuum. To this end UAS regulation and performance attributes were considered in conjunction to the sensor payloads they may carry. Collectively, the outputs from the study can be used to inform key stakeholders regarding decisions to use UAS in the near and short term as part of a biosecurity system.

Scoping Study for UAS Airspace Integration and Enhanced Conflict Management This project identified existing unmanned aircraft (UA) airspace integration work being conducted elsewhere in the world, and pin-pointed operational concepts specific to the operation of UA in Australia’s distinctive environment. Whilst UA are yet to enter civil airspace on a routine basis, they are becoming more prevalent as they move beyond the military sphere into the realm of government, private sector and commercial operators. This use is anticipated to grow in the future, hence the requirement to ensure that Australia’s air traffic management systems are ready to cater for them.

Green Falcon Solar Powered UAV: Multidisciplinary Design and Uncertainty Based Path Planning for Persistent Environmental Gas Sensing Monitoring This project focused upon the development of artificial intelligence, autonomy and a gas sensing capability for electric and solar powered UAVs. Unlike other solar UAVs, the Green Falcon is designed to be cost-effective, light weight and easily hand-launched with minimum maintenance requirements. The design supports improved endurance capabilities compared with other UAVs in the same class, which will allow the Green Falcon to provide rapid deployment and will be particularly useful in plant biosecurity, gas sensing, search and rescue or fire monitoring missions.

Vision-Based Collision Avoidance The ARCAA automated vision-based aircraft collision warning technologies project was a two-year Australian Research Council Linkage funded project between Boeing Research & Technology and ARCAA. The objective of the project is to investigate how computer vision technology can be used to meet and exceed the performance of human pilots in detecting potential aircraft collisions, thereby improving the safety of the world’s aviation fleets.

enhanced Flight Assist System (eFAS) for Automated Aerial Survey of Powerline Networks The objective of this project was the development of flight-path planning and aircraft guidance and control technology to suit the unique features of the consistent-sensing low-altitude trajectory-constrained aerial inspection problem. This problem is defined by the airborne collection of spatial information that is related to approximately linear power-line "feeder"-type infrastructure. Working with the CRC for Spatial Information and Ergon Energy, previous research had already demonstrated the essential importance of basic automation technologies in such large-scale inspection tasks. The specific objective of this project was the development of additional automation mechanisms that improve inspection efficiency, operational flexibility, and operational reliability so that high quality spatial information can be delivered in a timely and cost effective manner. The potential benefits of advanced 3D planning and flight control for the powerline network inspection activity include reduced pilot workload in both horizontal and vertical control of the aircraft, by maintaining safe horizontal and vertical separation from terrain/obstacles, and positioning the aircraft at the correct altitude, speed and orientation for effective data capture.

Technical and Market analysis of Gimbal Sensor Systems This project was a due diligence analysis conducted by ARCAA and CRCSI consultants as part of ROAMES research for Ergon Energy. It focused on the application of gimbal sensor systems mounted on an aeroplane for still image or video data capturing of power poles or other assets.

Flight Assist System The Flight Assist System (FAS) is a demonstrator project assisting Ergon Energy in development of the research outcome of a three-year CRC-SI project which focused on business improvement applications for Ergon Energy. The outcome of the CRC-SI project was a proposal for an advanced airborne vegetation management system that would save AUD$14 million per year. To commercialise the research outcomes, Ergon decided to launch the Remote Observation, Automated Modelling & Economic Simulation (ROAMES) project of which FAS is an essential component. ROAMES has since been divested to Fugro Spatial Solutions.

Smart Skies Project The Smart Skies Project is a leading edge research program exploring the research and development of future technologies that support the efficient utilisation of airspace by both manned and unmanned aircraft. It focused upon the exploration and development of three key enabling aviation technologies – an automated separation management system capable of providing separation assurance in complex airspace environments; sense-and-act systems for manned and unmanned aircraft capable of collision avoidance of dynamic and static obstacles; and a mobile aircraft tracking system utilising a cost-effective radar and dependent surveillance systems.

Airborne Powerline Inspection Technology Improvements The three year CRC-SI project 6.07 for Spatial information Business improvement applications at Ergon Energy focussed on precision guidance of aircraft over powerlines, asset and vegetation detection using LiDAR imagery, and detection and classification of tree species. The project was successfully completed in 2010 and provided the fundamental basis for the FAS project.

Whole of Network Planning The Whole of Network planning project involved research and development of new software to automatically process up to one million waypoints to create flight plans for inspecting Ergon Energy’s entire powerline network which is approximately 150,000 km and covers 97% of the state of QLD, Australia.

Flying Spore Trap This project and associated research aimed to determine the potential of using an unmanned aerial vehicle, fitted with a spore trap, to detect and monitor spores of plant pathogens for a biosecure Australia. The objective was to develop a sampling system that would have the ability to spatially monitor fungal spores, and protocols to interpret their spatial distribution. This tool will greatly enhance the ability to detect new incursions of fungal pathogens and to enable more accurate delimiting of distribution. The technology will allow for earlier detection of harmful plant pest or disease incursions in difficult areas and provide efficient and effective airborne surveillance.

== Research collaborators ==
ARCAA conducted research projects and consultancies with a wide variety of government, industry and academic institutions - projects have involved:

- CSIRO
- Queensland Government
- Australian Research Council
- Civil Aviation Safety Authority
- Boeing Research & Technology Australia
- Boeing Research & Technology US
- Insitu Pacific Limited
- CRC for Spatial Information
- CRC for Plant Biosecurity
- Ergon Energy
- ROAMES
- Thales
- Sir Lawrence Wackett Centre (RMIT)
- Politechnico di Torino
- Universidad Politecnica de Madrid
- Cetacean Research Unit (Murdoch University)
- ETH Zurich
- ARS Electronica
