= UAV Outback Challenge =

Annual robotics challenge

Coordinates: 26°34′50.08″S 151°50′23.79″E

The UAV Challenge - Outback Rescue, also known as the UAV Outback Challenge or UAV Challenge, is an annual competition for the development of unmanned aerial vehicles. The competition was first held in 2007 and features an open challenge for adults, and a high-school challenge. The event is aimed at promoting the civilian use of unmanned aerial vehicles and the development of low-cost systems that could be used for search and rescue missions. The event is one of the largest robotics challenges in the world and one of the highest stakes UAV challenges, with the 2018 Medical Express version of the event offering $75,000 to the winner.

The events involve a thorough scoring system with an emphasis on safety, capability and technical excellence. In particular there is a strong tendency towards autonomous flight. Notably, teams share technical details of their entries, allowing successful innovations to proliferate and increasing the speed of technological development.

The format of the Challenge changes as technological improvements make the tasks more achievable. In 2011 it changed to a search and rescue challenge. No teams successfully completed the challenge until 2014 when several teams were successful. In 2016 the open challenge changed to an automated medical retrieval task known as Medical Express and it was almost completed in 2016 and 2018. The UAV Challenge was not held in 2020 and 2021 due to the COVID-19 global pandemic, and the challenge did not return after pandemic.

== Challenges ==
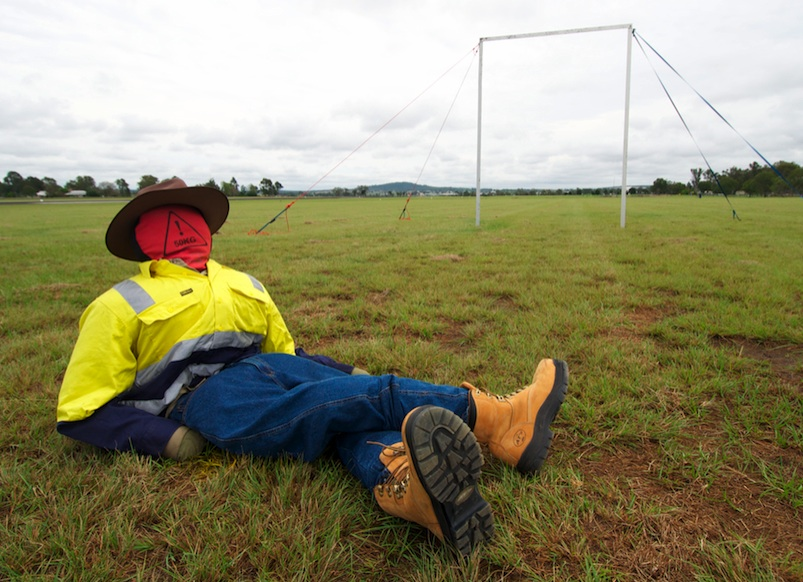
Outback Joe at the UAV Outback Challenge.

=== Medical Express Challenge (2015-2018) ===
The Medical Express Challenge is the current event that is open to all. It was first held between 2015 and 2016 with the first event held in Dalby, Queensland, Australia in September 2016. The current Medical Express runs from 2017 to 2018 with the event again being held in Dalby. The challenge itself is for teams to develop a solution to the problem of remote medical retrieval. Teams have to fly their aircraft at least 20 kilometres (12 mi) to a remote farm, detect the farmer Outback Joe and autonomously land close by. The farmer places a medical sample into the aircraft and it must then return to the original launch point which is at least 20 kilometres (12 mi) away. The challenge was very nearly completed at the first attempt by a team from Canberra, Australia called Canberra UAV. Their communications relay aircraft crashed at the remote farm site due to an engine failure and the challenge was hence not completed. But their main aircraft did successfully return the medical sample from the farm.

=== Search and Rescue Challenge (2011-2014) ===
The Search and Rescue Challenge was held from 2011 to 2014. It was open to worldwide participation, including by universities and hobbyists. In the challenge, teams must find a target dummy, called Outback Joe and accurately deliver an emergency package to him. The backstory of Joe is that he is a bushwalker that has gotten lost, or a worker whose ute has broken down. He is represented by a 50 kg mannequin dressed in jeans, a work shirt, work boots and an Akubra. The mission area is nearly 2 kilometres (1.2 mi) from the airport and is approximately 4 kilometres (2.5 mi) x 6 kilometres (3.7 mi). Teams must not fly greater than 1,500 feet (460 m) above ground level (AGL). Under the rules, teams were required to firstly identify the latitude and longitude of the target to within 100 meters. Teams that succeeded in this task were permitted to attempt to drop the package and complete the challenge.

Outback Joe was first spotted in 2010 by the University of North Dakota team. In 2012, the Canberra UAV team's aircraft automatically located the target the first fully automatic detection during all events. In 2014, five teams correctly identified the target location allowing them to drop a package to him. The winner of the challenge was CanberraUAV, who dropped a water bottle to within 2.6 metres of the target.

=== Airborne Delivery Challenge ===
The Airborne delivery challenge is open to Australian high school students. The objective is to create a future generation of aerospace professionals with a focus on UAVs.

An airframe has to be built and the mission is executed by two persons who will not communicate during the mission and will have technological targeting solutions in place:

- UAV Controller in charge of piloting the airframe (or programming the mission in case of the Robotic challenge)
- Mission manager in charge of the mission package drop

Other team members are permitted and many teams have roles for a team manager, media manager and safety manager.

In 2009 and 2010 a Robot Airborne Delivery Challenge was also held in parallel to the main Airborne Delivery Challenge. The Robot competition was dropped in 2011 in favor of bonus points for autonomous payload dropping in the Airborne Delivery Challenge.

== Rod Walker Trophy ==
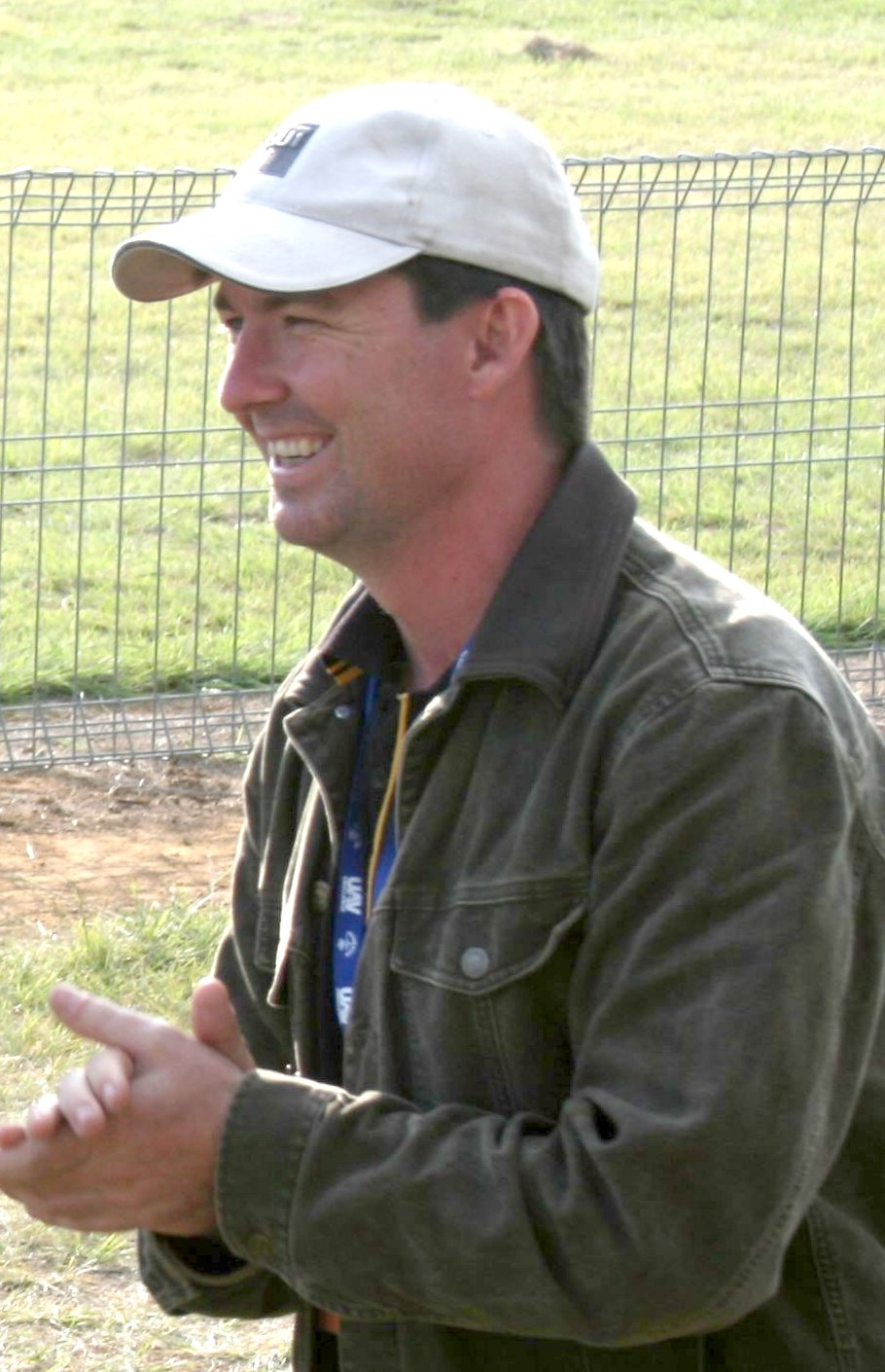
Rod Walker at the UAV Outback Challenge 2008.

The first place team in the open competition receives the Rod Walker Trophy. The trophy is named in honour of Rodney Walker (QUT), who conceived of the idea of the UAV Outback Challenge in 2005 along with Jonathan Roberts and George Curran of CSIRO. Rod Walker, a professor at Queensland University of Technology, died in October 2011, aged 42. A memorial fund was set up to support individuals and organisations that try to enhance the use of UAVs for civilian purposes.

Past winners of the Rod Walker Trophy

- 2018 Monash UAS
- 2016 Canberra UAV
- 2014 Canberra UAV
- 2012 Canberra UAV

== The Kingaroy Triangle ==
The term The Kingaroy Triangle was coined during the second UAV Challenge event in 2008 when it was noticed that aircraft and systems that had worked perfectly well before the UAV Challenge suddenly appeared to have problems at Kingaroy. The term is a reference to the more famous Bermuda Triangle and also a reference to the general shape of the competition boundary area, which is roughly triangular in nature.

== Annual challenges ==
=== 2007 competition ===
The first event was held between September 24 and 27. It attracted interest from 43 teams from 6 countries of whom 20 submitted full entries. No teams passed flight scrutineering although Team Dionysus from the USA did demonstrate some autonomous flight at the airport. MUROC I, a high school team from Mueller College, won the inaugural Payload Delivery Challenge.

| Challenge | Grand prize | Winners | Encouragement awards |
|---|---|---|---|
| Search and Rescue Challenge | A$40,000.00 | (not completed) | Dionysus |
| High School Payload Delivery Challenge | A$10,000.00 | MUROC I (Mueller College) | N/A |
| Search and Rescue Documentary Challenge | N/A | Dionysus | N/A |
| High School Documentary Challenge | N/A | MUROC Combined | N/A |

In 2007 the UAV Challenge was organised by the Australian Research Centre for Aerospace Automation (a five-year-long partnership between CSIRO and Queensland University of Technology), the Queensland State Government, and Boeing Defence Australia.

=== 2008 competition ===
The 2008 UAV Outback Challenge was held between September 22 and 24 and had a combined prize fund of A$70,000. The prize for completing the Search and Rescue Challenge was increased to A$50,000. 51 teams from 8 different countries expressed an interest in entering with 17 finally qualifying for the event. As in 2007, teams failed to complete the Search and Rescue mission, with only Team Telemasters and Missouri S&T UAV teams passing the stringent flight scrutineering to begin the S & R Mission. Missouri S&T crashed on takeoff, and Team Telemasters aborted shortly after takeoff. No flights left the airport for the search area.

| Challenge | Grand prize | Winners | Encouragement awards |
|---|---|---|---|
| Search and Rescue Challenge | A$50,000.00 | (not completed) | Telemasters (A$5,000), Missouri S&T UAV Team (A$3,000), QUT SRUAV 08 (A$1,000), Missouri S&T UAV Team (A$500) |
| High School Payload Delivery Challenge | A$10,000.00 | Mueller College - MUROC Bush Pilots | TSHS Mt Lofty (A$500) |
| Search and Rescue Documentary Challenge | A$8,000.00 | Mueller College - MUROC Bush Masters | N/A |
| High School Documentary Challenge | A$2,000.00 | Brisbane Boys’ College – Bash, Burn and Crash | N/A |

In 2008 the UAV Challenge was organised by the Australian Research Centre for Aerospace Automation (a five-year-long partnership between CSIRO and Queensland University of Technology), the Queensland State Government, and Boeing Defence Australia.

=== 2009 competition ===
The 2009 UAV Challenge was announced in the December/January 2008 issue of Aviation Business Asia Pacific magazine. The 2009 event took place between September 28 and October 1. The combined challenge award funds were A$70,000.00. 34 Search and Rescue teams from 5 countries expressed an interest in entering with 12 finally qualifying for the event. In addition to the traditional Search and Rescue Challenge and Airborne Delivery Challenge, there was a new Robot Airborne Delivery Challenge open to high-school students. The two separate documentary challenges of the previous years were combined into a single Documentary Challenge.

2009 was the first year that teams managed to enter the search area. Team Galah suffered an engine shutdown just inside the search area and made an emergency landing less than 100 metres (330 ft) from Outback Joe (although they were not aware of this at the time). Team Melbourne UAV were en route to the search area when high wind conditions flipped their aircraft causing it to enter flight termination mode. The airframe was lost due to high impact with the ground.

| Challenge | Grand prize | Winners | Encouragement awards |
|---|---|---|---|
| Search and Rescue Challenge | A$50,000.00 | (not completed) | Melbourne UAV (A$7,500), Team Galah (A$7,500) |
| Robot Airborne Delivery Challenge | A$10,000.00 | Look mAh! No Hands!, Brisbane Grammar School | - |
| Airborne Delivery Challenge | A$5,000.00 | Cloud 9, Aviation High | Wynnum North State High School (A$500) |
| Documentary challenge | A$5,000.00 | Melbourne UAV | N/A |

In 2009 the UAV Challenge was organised by the Australian Research Centre for Aerospace Automation (a five-year-long partnership between CSIRO and Queensland University of Technology), the Queensland State Government, and Boeing Defence Australia.

=== 2010 competition ===
The 2010 UAV Challenge took place between September 27 and 29. In the Search and Rescue competition a team from the University of North Dakota became the first in UAV Challenge history to successfully locate Outback Joe, managing to pinpoint his location to within 15 metres (49 ft) (from 800 feet (240 m) AGL). However, they failed to drop a water bottle within 100 metres (330 ft) (as required by the rules) and hence did not win the A$50,000 prize. Team Robota, from Texas, was awarded second place after their aircraft successfully entered the search area but had to abort the mission due to a technical issue. A total of 43 teams entered the Search and Rescue competition with 12 qualifying to fly but only six flying at the event.

| Challenge | Grand prize | Winners | Encouragement awards |
|---|---|---|---|
| Search and Rescue Challenge | A$50,000.00 | (not completed) | First Place: University of North Dakota (A$15,000), Second Place: Team Robota (A$5,000) |
| Robot Airborne Delivery Challenge | A$10,000.00 | (not completed) | - |
| Airborne Delivery Challenge | A$5,000.00 | Calamvale Hornets | - |
| Documentary challenge | A$5,000.00 | Latitude 38 UAV | N/A |

In 2010 the UAV Challenge was organised by ARCAA (QUT and CSIRO), Queensland Government and Aviation Development Australia Limited. It was sponsored by Insitu, CASA, Australian Defence Magazine, AUVS-Australia, Boeing, CAE Inc. and South Burnett Regional Council.

=== 2011 competition (new format) ===
On 16 March 2011, the UAV Challenge organizers announced major changes to the format of the Challenges. Stated changes included a new longer format Search and Rescue Challenge that results in an event at Kingaroy being held every two years instead of every year (as was done from 2007 to 2010) and the development of Australian State Championships for the Airborne Delivery Challenge. The organizers were quoted as saying that they believe this will lead to "more participants competing with a very high standard of UAV capability".

For the first time, the event was not held at Kingaroy. Instead an Airborne Delivery Challenge (High-School teams) championship was held at Calvert Radio Aero Modellers Society flying field (approximately 25 kilometres (16 mi) west of Ipswich, Queensland) between September 27 and 28.

| Airborne Delivery Challenge | Prize | Winner |
|---|---|---|
| First place | A$8,000.00 | Calamvale Lightning |
| Second place | A$4,000.00 | MUROC Masters |
| Third place | A$2,000.00 | Aviation High Team Spectrum |
| Airmanship award | T-shirt and Mars Bar | Jordan Tonges (Aviation High Le Phoenix) |

In 2011 the UAV Challenge was organised by ARCAA (QUT and CSIRO) and AUVS-Australia. It was sponsored by Queensland Government, had the assistance of Ipswich City Council, and technical staff from Boeing, UAS Pacific and Skills Queensland.

=== 2012 competition ===
The 2012 event was held at Kingaroy October 1–3 and followed a similar format to the 2010 competition with both a Search and Rescue and Airborne Delivery Challenge. The 2012 Search and Rescue competition actually began in 2011 when the competition was lengthened to 18 months in duration. 2012 saw the introduction of the Search Phase as part of the Airborne Delivery Challenge competitions.

Sixty-eight teams registered for the Search and Rescue Challenge, with 53 passing the first checkpoint. Over the subsequent 18 months the field was reduced to just five, the rest having either failed to pass certain milestones or withdrawing due to technical difficulties such as crashes. At the event in Kingaroy, four teams launched their aircraft into the range. The main task was not completed by any of the teams. However, two teams did manage to complete a significant portion of their search phase and successfully returned their aircraft to the airport. Team Canberra UAV achieved automatic detection of Outback Joe - the first team to do so in the history of the event. They did not manage to drop the bottle of water due to an in-flight incident prior to the Outback Joe detection when it appeared that the water bottle became loose from the aircraft and fell off.

Thirteen teams competed in the Airborne Delivery Challenge with a winner declared for its Search Phase. The Airmanship Award was sponsored by Insitu Pacific and was awarded to Nina Clark for her outstanding team leadership.

| Challenge | Grand prize | Winners | Encouragement awards |
|---|---|---|---|
| Search and Rescue Challenge (Rod Walker Trophy) | A$50,000.00 | (not completed) | First Place: Canberra UAV (A$10,000 and the Rod Walker Trophy), Runners-up in order: OpenUAS (A$5,000), Forward Robotics (A$1,000) and CompassUAV (A$1,000) |
| Airborne Delivery Challenge | A$8,000.00 | MUROC Hawks | - |
| Airborne Delivery Search Phase | A$2,000.00 | MUROC Raiders | - |
| Insitu Pacific Airmanship Award | Trophy | Nina Clark (Team Captain of Aviation High Thunderbirds) | - |

In 2012 the UAV Challenge was organised by ARCAA (QUT and CSIRO), AUVS-Australia and Aviation Development Australia Limited. It was sponsored by Insitu Pacific, Boeing, Lockheed Martin, CASA, Mathworks, Aviation Australia, Stanwell Corporation Limited and DSTO. The Challenge was also supported by the Queensland Government, South Burnett Regional Council, UAS-Pacific, the U.S. Office of Naval Research Global, the Asian Office of Aerospace Research and Development, and Australian Defence Magazine. The event also had the assistance of personnel from Raytheon, the Royal Australian Navy and the Victoria Police Air Wing.

=== 2013 competition ===
2013 was a high-school only event with the international Search and Rescue Challenge starting that year but running for two years (with its own event at Kingaroy, Queensland, Australia planned for September 2014). For the second time, the Airborne Delivery Challenge (High-School teams) championship was held at Calvert Radio Aero Modellers Society flying field. The Challenge took place between September 24 and 25. The competition was very close and was notable because for the first time a high-school team (The Hexfactor for Mueller College) managed to achieve a successful autonomous drop of a chocolate bar to Outback Joe, landing within the required 10m distance to be award bonus points. Although the Hexfactor did not win the event, the fact that they succeeded with some autonomy was a milestone for the UAV Challenge.

| Airborne Delivery Challenge | Prize | Winner |
|---|---|---|
| First place | A$5,000.00 | Calamvale Raptors II |
| Second place | A$2,000.00 | MUROC Hawks 2.0 |
| Third place | A$1,000.00 | MUROC Crazy Cubz |
| Search Phase | A$2,000.00 | Calamvale Reapers |
| Insitu Pacific Airmanship Award | Trophy | Fletcher Thomas (Riverton & District High School, South Australia) |

In 2013 the UAV Challenge was organised by ARCAA (a QUT research centre) and CSIRO. It was sponsored by Insitu Pacific, Boeing, Northrop Grumman and Mathworks. The Challenge was also supported by the Queensland Government, the Australian Association for Unmanned Systems, and UAS-Pacific. The event also had the assistance of personnel from VTOL-Aerospace and Aviation Australia.

=== 2014 competition ===
The 2014 event was held at Kingaroy September 22–26 and followed the same format to the 2012 competition with both a Search and Rescue and Airborne Delivery Challenge. For the first time ever, the Search and Rescue mission task was completed and the UAV Challenge Outback Rescue was won. Four teams completed the mission task with CanberraUAV winning the $50,000 prize on points. They were also awarded the Rod Walker Trophy for their win. They completed the mission with an autonomous takeoff, a bottle drop accuracy of 2.6m and a fully autonomous landing. One hundred and sixteen Search and Rescue teams registered for the event, with the field of teams being reduced to 20 after the Deliverable 3 qualifying round. Fourteen teams flew at the event and left the airport, beating the previous record of four teams. Four teams successfully completed the task of finding Outback Joe and delivering him at least 500ml of water to within 100m of his location. Team SFWA from Melbourne, Australia, were the first team in the history of the event to complete the mission. A fifth team, VAMUdeS from Canada came close to completing the mission with a drop of 116m. The Search and Rescue competition Airmanship Award was sponsored by Insitu Pacific and was awarded to Pawel Wozniak for his outstanding team leadership and decision making.

| Search and Rescue Challenge | Team | Points | Drop Distance (m) | Mission Time (minutes) | Country |
|---|---|---|---|---|---|
| First place and Winner of Rod Walker Trophy | CanberraUAV | 132.5 | 2.6 | 41 | Australia |
| Second place | Robota | 114.3 | 44.0 | 50 | USA |
| Third place | SFWA | 113.5 | 23.6 | 50 | Australia |
| Fourth | Team Thunder | 111.0 | 68.0 | 34 | Australia |
| Insitu Pacific Airmanship Award | Pawel Wozniak (Pilot of MelAvio) | | | | Poland |

The high-school Airborne Delivery Challenge in 2014 was, for the first time, open to high-school teams from outside Australia. Fifteen teams entered and qualified to attend the event in Kingaroy. The winner of the Airborne Delivery main competition was the all-girls team the DareDivas from Mueller College, Australia. Another all-girls team, from Knight High School in California, came third. The Airborne Delivery competition Airmanship Award was sponsored by Insitu Pacific and was awarded to Russell Porter from Indooroopilly State High School.

| Airborne Delivery Challenge | Prize | Winner | School | Country |
|---|---|---|---|---|
| First place | A$5,000.00 | MUROC DareDivas | Mueller College | Australia |
| Second place | A$2,000.00 | MUROC HexFactor | Mueller College | Australia |
| Third place | A$1,000.00 | Spirit of Niles I | Knight High School | USA |
| Search Phase | A$2,000.00 | Calamvale Euros | Calamvale Community College | Australia |
| Insitu Pacific Airmanship Award | Trophy | Russell Porter (Pilot of Indooroopilly UAV) | Indooroopilly State High School | Australia |

In 2014 the UAV Challenge was organised by ARCAA (a QUT research centre) and CSIRO. It was sponsored by Insitu Pacific, Northrop Grumman, Mathworks, Boeing, CASA, Stanwell Corporation Limited and DSTO. The Challenge was also supported by the Queensland Government, South Burnett Regional Council, UAS-Pacific, and Australian Defence Magazine. The event also had the assistance of personnel from Raytheon Australia, Aviation Australia, V-TOL Aerospace and the Victoria Police Air Wing.

=== 2015 competition ===
2015 was a high school-only event with the international Medical Express Challenge starting that year but running for two years (with its own event in Queensland, Australia planned for September 2016). The high-school event was held for the third time at Calvert Radio Aero Modellers Society flying field (approximately 25 kilometres (16 mi) west of Ipswich, Queensland). The event was significant in that major changes to the rules of the Airborne Delivery Challenge meant that the mission task was far more difficult for teams that it had been in previous years. For this competition, teams had to drop a medical payload without breaking it. 2015 also saw the re-introduction of a fully autonomous competition for high-school students, the Robotic Delivery Challenge. Three teams qualified, but none managed to complete the mission.

| Airborne Delivery Challenge | Prize | Winner | School | Country |
|---|---|---|---|---|
| First place | A$5,000.00 | MUROC Double Duo | Mueller College | Australia |
| Second place | A$2,000.00 | MUROC Par Hexellence | Mueller College | Australia |
| Robotics Delivery Challenge | Prize | Winner | School | Country |
| First place | A$5,000.00 | Not awarded (no team qualified for the prize) | NA | NA |
| Insitu Pacific Airmanship Award | Trophy | Michael Phillips (Pilot of Double Duo) | Mueller College | Australia |

In 2015 the UAV Challenge was organised by ARCAA (a QUT research centre) and Data61 (a unit of CSIRO). It was sponsored by Insitu Pacific, Northrop Grumman, Boeing, DSTO, and LightWare. The Challenge was also supported by the Queensland Government.

=== 2018 competition ===
2018 marks the return of the Medical Express Challenge for the open teams and the introduction of voluntary dynamic no-fly zones (DNFZ) to the competition. Dynamic no-fly zones represent obstacles that an UAV must avoid during its transit to the search area, which can be birds, bad weather and other aircraft. These obstacles are generated by a computer and passed onto the teams. Due to the complexity of this requirement, only a few teams attempted this aspect of the challenge, with the stand out being Canberra UAV whose avoidance performance impressed the judges.

The main goal of the competition was to fly to a designated search area and search for a target, onto which the aircraft must land vertically within 10m and retrieve a blood sample from Outback Joe, and return to the base with the sample. The competition was exceptionally close this year, with the top two teams scoring within 1% of one another. The team that has come out on top was Monash UAS, an undergraduate university team from Melbourne, Australia. Although no teams technically completed the challenge due to a variety of reasons, the top three teams were able to return the sample to the base intact.

| Medical Express Challenge | Prize | Winner |
|---|---|---|
| First place | A$25,000.00 | Not awarded |
| Rank 1 | | Monash UAS |
| Rank 2 | | Team Dhaksha |
| Rank 3 | | Canberra UAV |
| Rod Walker Trophy | A$10,000.00 | Monash UAS |
| Airmanship award | | Griffin UAV |
| DST Group Extension Autonomy Challenge | | Canberra UAV |

== See also ==
- List of computer science awards
- Multi Autonomous Ground-robotic International Challenge a land-based search, mapping and tracking competition.
- Robocup Rescue Robot League a ground-robot search and rescue competition.
