= 2d3 =

American motion imagery software company

2d3 Sensing
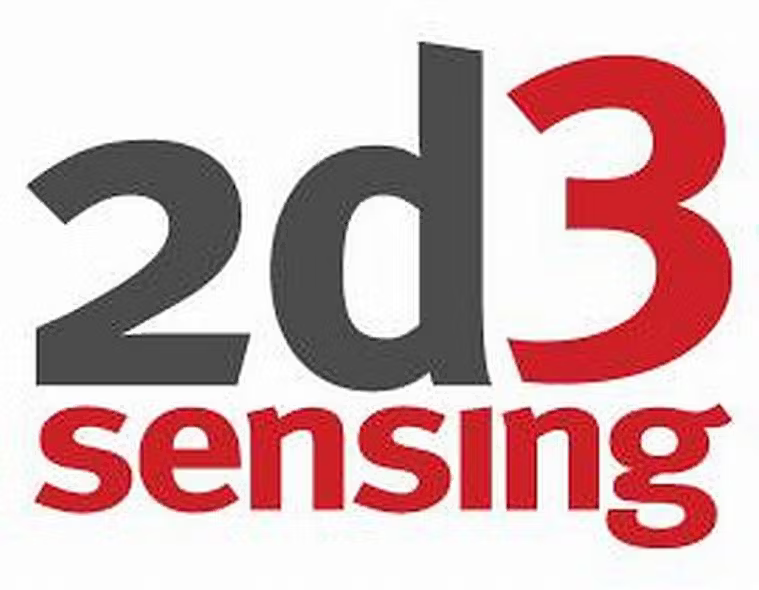
- Industry: Software
- Founded: 1999
- Headquarters: Irvine, California
- Services: computer vision based technology

2d3 Sensing is an American motion imagery software company based in Irvine, California. It is a wholly owned subsidiary of UK-based OMG plc. Using structure from motion, the company’s suite of products can extract information from images or videos by recreating, manipulating, and enhancing imagery to visualize two-dimensional data into three dimensions. 2d3 follows a COTS business model and conforms to and influences emerging standards such as MISB (Motion Imagery Standards Board) and STANAG.

== History ==
Found in 1999, 2d3 focused on the application of computer vision based technology to specific use cases, such as the entertainment, law enforcement, defense, and medical imaging industries. The company’s initial product, Boujou, was used in the film industry and won a Primetime Emmy Award for technical achievement.

In 2006, 2d3 adopted the COTS model and entered the growing aerial imagery market. The company developed real-time forensic tools for FMV (full motion video) enhancement, which facilitated the conversion of geospatial metadata into intelligence.

In 2011, the company acquired digital media management and processing firm, Sensing Systems, Inc., and the resulting merged company was renamed to 2d3 Sensing.

In 2015, the company was acquired by The Boeing Company's subsidiary company Insitu.
