= NOAAS Oscar Dyson =

NOAA research ship

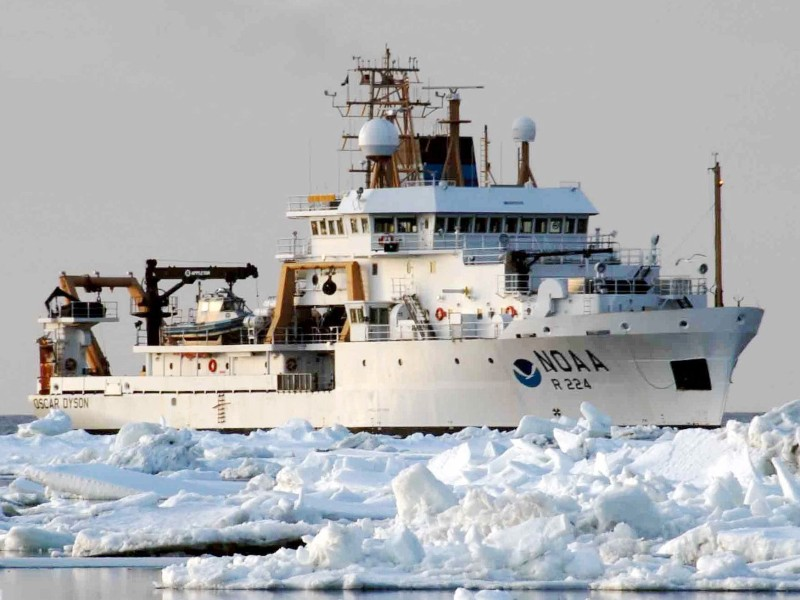
- NOAAS Oscar Dyson (R 224) in northern waters.

History

United States
- Name: NOAAS Oscar Dyson (R 224)
- Namesake: Oscar E. Dyson (1913–1995), Alaskan fisherman and fishing industry leader
- Operator: National Oceanic and Atmospheric Administration
- Builder: VT Halter Marine, Moss Point, Mississippi
- Launched: 17 October 2003
- Sponsored by: Peggy Dyson-Malson
- Acquired: 1 August 2004 (delivered)
- Commissioned: 28 May 2005
- Home port: Kodiak, Alaska
- Identification: IMO number: 9270335; MMSI number: 369959000; Callsign: WTEP
- Nickname(s): NOAA Flagship to Alaska
- Status: Active

General characteristics
- Type: Fisheries research ship
- Tonnage: 2,479 tons (full load)
- Displacement: 1,840 metric tons (light ship); 2,479 metric tons (full load)
- Length: 208.6 ft (63.6 m)
- Beam: 49.2 ft (15.0 m)
- Draft: 19.4 ft (5.9 m) (with centerboard up); 30.3 ft (9.2 m) (with centerboard down)
- Ice class: Polar Ice Hull Class 5
- Propulsion: One 2.25 MW (3,017-shp) integrated diesel-electric, 24-pulse DC SCR drive system with two 1,150-kW (1,542-hp) propulsion motors on a common shaft, two 1,360-kW diesel generators, and two 910-kW diesel generators; one fixed-pitch propeller; one 720-kW (966-hp) AC induction azimuthing bow thruster
- Speed: 14 knots (26 km/h) (emergency); 12 knots (22 km/h) (cruising)
- Range: 12,000 nautical miles (22,000 km)
- Endurance: 40 days
- Boats & landing craft carried: 1 × 27 ft (8.2 m) survey launch; 1 × 22 ft (6.7 m) rescue boat
- Complement: 24 (5 NOAA Corps officers and mates, 4 licensed engineers, and 15 other crew members), plus up to 30 scientists (25 males 5 females)
- Sensors & processing systems: Kongsberg EK-80
- Aircraft carried: 5 - Drones

NOAAS Oscar Dyson (R 224) is an American fisheries and oceanographic research vessel in commission in the National Oceanic and Atmospheric Administration (NOAA) fleet since 2005.

== Construction and commissioning ==
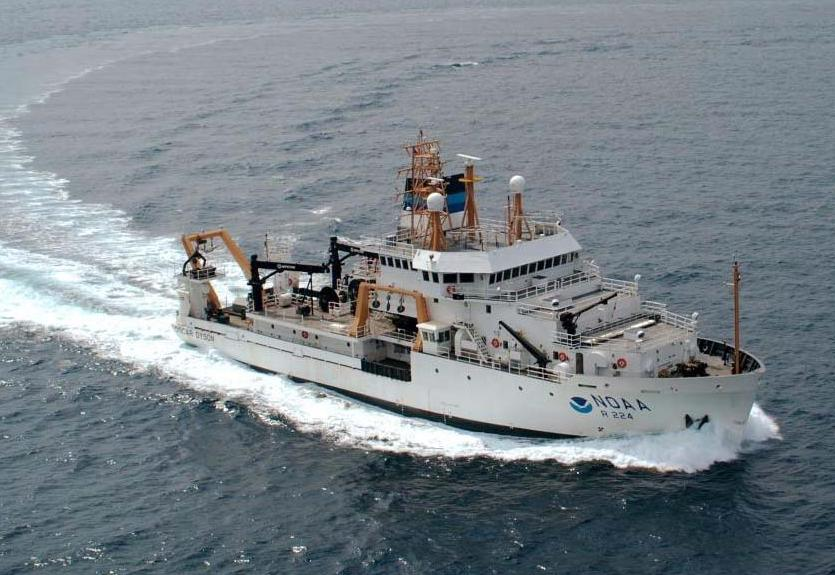
An aerial view of NOAAS Oscar Dyson (R 224) underway.

Oscar Dyson was built by VT Halter Marine at Moss Point, Mississippi, and launched on 17 October 2003. The ship was sponsored by Peggy Dyson-Malson, a ship-to-shore weather broadcaster for the National Weather Service in Kodiak, Alaska from 1974 and 1999 and the widow of the ship's namesake, Alaskan fisherman and fishing industry leader Oscar E. Dyson. Delivered to NOAA on 1 August 2004, the ship eventually proceeded to Kodiak, Dyson's home town, where she was commissioned into service as NOAAS Oscar Dyson (R 224) on 28 May 2005.

== Characteristics and capabilities ==
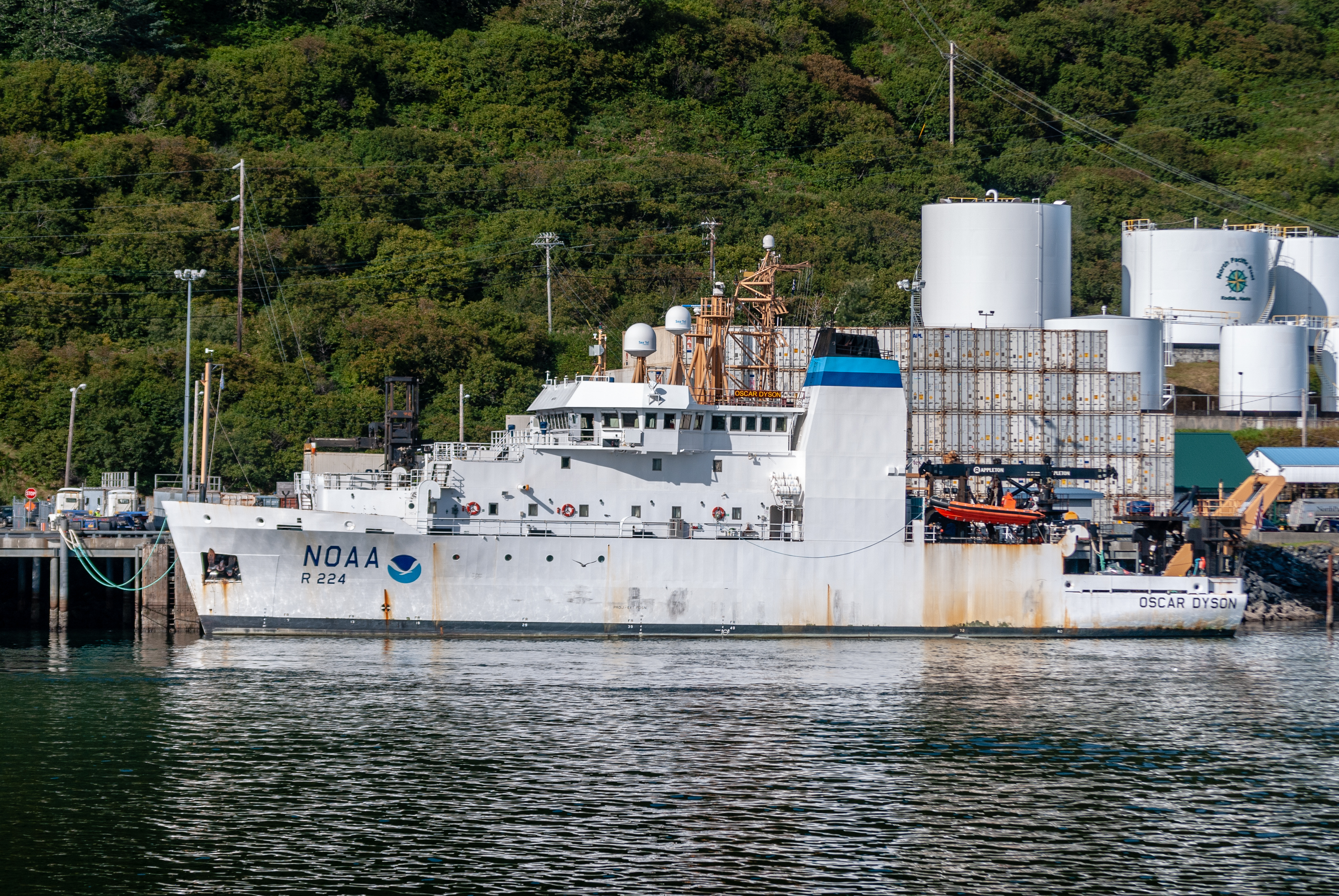
NOAAS Oscar Dyson docked in her home port of Kodiak, Alaska.

Capable of conducting multidisciplinary oceanographic operations in support of biological, chemical, and physical process studies, Oscar Dyson was commissioned as the first of a class of five advanced fisheries research vessels, able to conduct both fishing and oceanographic research. She is a stern trawler with fishing capabilities similar to those of commercial fishing vessels. She is rigged for longlining and trap fishing and can conduct trawling operations to depths of 1,800 meters (5,900 feet). Her most advanced feature is the incorporation of acoustic quieting technology to enable NOAA scientists to monitor fish populations without the ship's noise altering the behavior of the fish. Her oceanographic hydrophones are mounted on a retractable centerboard, or drop keel, that lowers scientific transducers away from the region of hull-generated flow noise, enhancing the quality of the data collected. To take full advantage of these advanced data-gathering capabilities, she has the Scientific Sonar System, which can accurately measure the biomass of fish in a survey area. She also has an Acoustic Doppler Current Profiler with which to collect data on ocean currents and a multibeam sonar system that provides information on the content of the water column and on the type and topography of the seafloor while she is underway, and she can gather hydrographic data at any speed up to 11 knots (20 km/h).

Oscar Dyson has a traction-type oceanographic winch which can deploy up to 5,000 meters (16,000 feet) of 17-mm (0.67-inch) wire rope or other cable, including fiberoptic cable. She also has two hydrographic winches, each of which can deploy 3,600 meters (11,800 feet) of 9.5-mm (3/8-inch) EM cable, two trawl winches, each of which can deploy 4,300 meters (14,100 feet) of cable, and a Gilson winch. She has a 60-foot (18-meter) telescopic boom with a lifting capacity of 6,250 pounds (2,835 kg) aft and a 23-foot (7.0-meter) fixed boom with a lifting capacity of 1,000 pounds (450 kg) at her bow. She has an A-frame on her starboard side with a safe working load of 8,050 pounds (3,650 kg) and a large A-frame aft. The oceanographic winch and large after A-frame work in conjunction to serve her stern sampling station, while the two hydrographic winches work with the side A-frame to service her side sampling station, and the two hydrographic winches together give Oscar Dyson the capability to have two scientific packages ready for sequential operations. In addition to trawling, her sampling stations can deploy smaller sampling nets, longlines, and fish traps. The hydrographic winches can deploy CTD instruments to measure the electrical conductivity, temperature, and chlorophyll fluorescence of sea water. Oscar Dyson also can deploy specialized gear such as Multiple Opening/Closing Net and Environmental Sensing System (MOCNESS) frames, towed vehicles, dredges, and bottom corers, and she can deploy and recover both floating and bottom-moored sensor arrays.

Oscar Dyson has various laboratory capabilities. A wet laboratory, a dry laboratory, a biology laboratory, and a hydrographic laboratory all are situated on the starboard side of her main deck, while an electronics and computer laboratory are on the port side of her main deck. Her wet laboratory includes a climate-controlled space with a built-in chiller system.

Oscar Dyson carries two boats. Her 27-foot (8.2-meter) survey launch has a 260-horsepower (194-kW) motor and can accommodate up to eight people. Her 22-foot (6.7-meter) rescue boat has a 256-horsepower (191-kW) motor and can carry up to six people.

Designed for operations in Alaskan waters, Oscar Dyson has an ice-strengthened welded-steel hull. In addition to her crew of 24, she can accommodate up to 15 scientists.

== Service history ==
Operated by NOAA's Office of Marine and Aviation Operations and with Kodiak as her home port, Oscar Dyson's primary purpose is to support NOAA's mission of protecting, restoring, and managing the use of living marine, coastal, and ocean resources. She conducts projects for NOAA's Alaska Fisheries Science Center and the Pacific Marine Environmental Laboratory, studying and monitoring Alaskan pollock and other fisheries in the Bering Sea and Gulf of Alaska. She makes weather and sea state observations, conducts oceanographic research and habitat assessments, and surveys marine mammal and seabird populations.

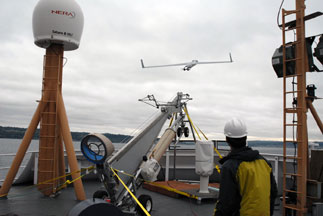
A ScanEagle unmanned aerial vehicle is launched from NOAAS Oscar Dyson (R 224) in Puget Sound.

In 2007 and 2008, Oscar Dyson took scientists to the Bering Sea so that they could capture seals on the ice there and attach satellite tags to them with which to collect movement and behavior data. To expand NOAA's ability to monitor ribbon, bearded, spotted, and ringed seals, whose broad range and remoteness from shore make surveying them using manned helicopters challenging, NOAA conducted tests of the ScanEagle unmanned aerial vehicle (UAV) aboard Oscar Dyson in October 2008. On 15 and 16 October 2008, scientists and technicians aboard Oscar Dyson conducted three successful test flights of the ScanEagle over Puget Sound, Washington, launching it from a pneumatic catapult attached to the top of her bridge, flying it by remote control from Oscar Dyson, and recovering it with a "skyhook" system – a vertical line deployed over Oscar Dyson's starboard side between a winch and a boom – that the ScanEagle could grab with hooks on its wingtips as it returned to the ship. As a United States Coast Guard officer aboard Oscar Dyson to study the feasibility of using the ScanEagle for search and rescue missions looked on, Oscar Dyson's bridge personnel and the embarked UAV pilots cooperated closely to ensure that the ship's speed and heading facilitated the launch and recovery of the aircraft. The test demonstrated the feasibility of using UAVs to assess the abundance and distribution of seals, which began in the spring of 2009.

On 30 April and 1 May 2017, Oscar Dyson surveyed an area in the Bering Sea off Dalnoi Point on the northwestern tip of St. George Island in the Pribilof Islands in a search for the wreck of the 92-foot (28.0 m) crab-fishing boat Destination, which had capsized and sunk in the area with the loss of her entire crew of six men on 11 February 2017. She did not find the wreck, but her survey narrowed the search area for the NOAA research ship NOAAS Fairweather (S 220), which discovered the wreck in about 250 feet (76 m) of water during a survey on 8 and 9 July 2017.

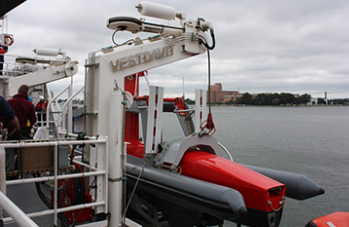
The DriX uncrewed surface vehicle in a protective cradle in a davit aboard Oscar Dyson in Puget Sound in January 2023.

During a three-day cruise in Puget Sound in January 2023, Oscar Dyson tested NOAA's DriX uncrewed surface vehicle, using a protective cradle lowered from her davits to launch and recover it. Launching and recovery of the vehicle was successful, and scientists aboard Oscar Dyson successfully testing the vehicle's acoustic sensors.

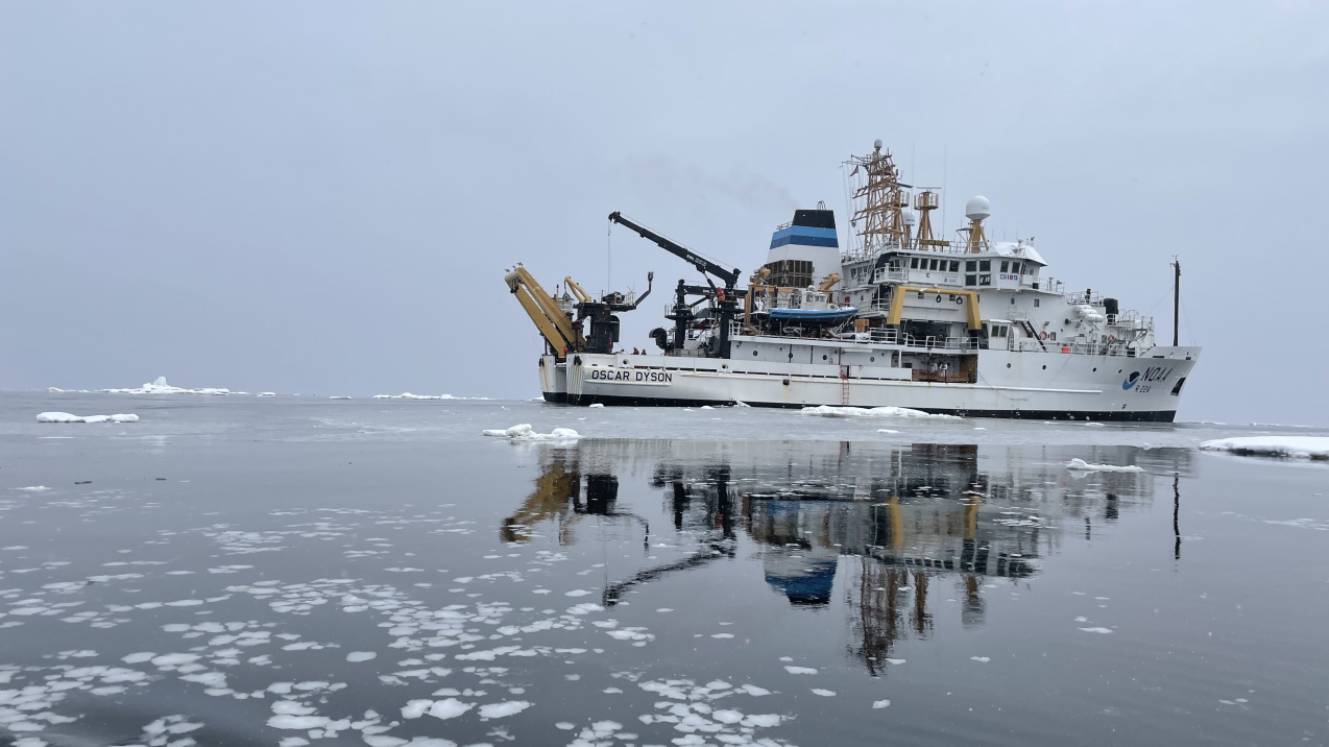
Oscar Dyson at sea in Alaskan waters for a scientific cruise.

On 18 June 2025, NOAA announced that it had awarded a $95,408,666 contract to JAG Alaska, Inc., of Seward, Alaska, for extensive upgrades and maintenance work on Oscar Dyson intended to extend her service life by replacing her propulsion system with variable-speed, Tier 4 generators, installing quiet air conditioning motors and updated technology for her science missions, replacing pumps, fans, cranes, and her fire detection system and radars, and increasing the number of single-person staterooms aboard. The ship will become the second ship in the fleet to receive the new paint job to align the NOAA fleet with the aircraft design, a controversial initiative started by VADM Hann. Many mariners have reported being unhappy with this decision citing the aircraft lack of integration to NOAA fleet. NOAA expected the work to take about a year, planning for it to begin after Oscar Dyson completed the 2026 field season and expecting her to return to service in time for the 2028 field season. To allow its research activities in Alaska to continue seamlessly in the meantime, NOAA planned to outfit the research ship NOAAS Bell M. Shimada (R 227) for Arctic service and deploy her to Alaskan waters while Oscar Dyson was in the shipyard.

== See also ==
- NOAA ships and aircraft
