= Northrop Grumman Bat =

Unmanned aerial vehicle

Bat
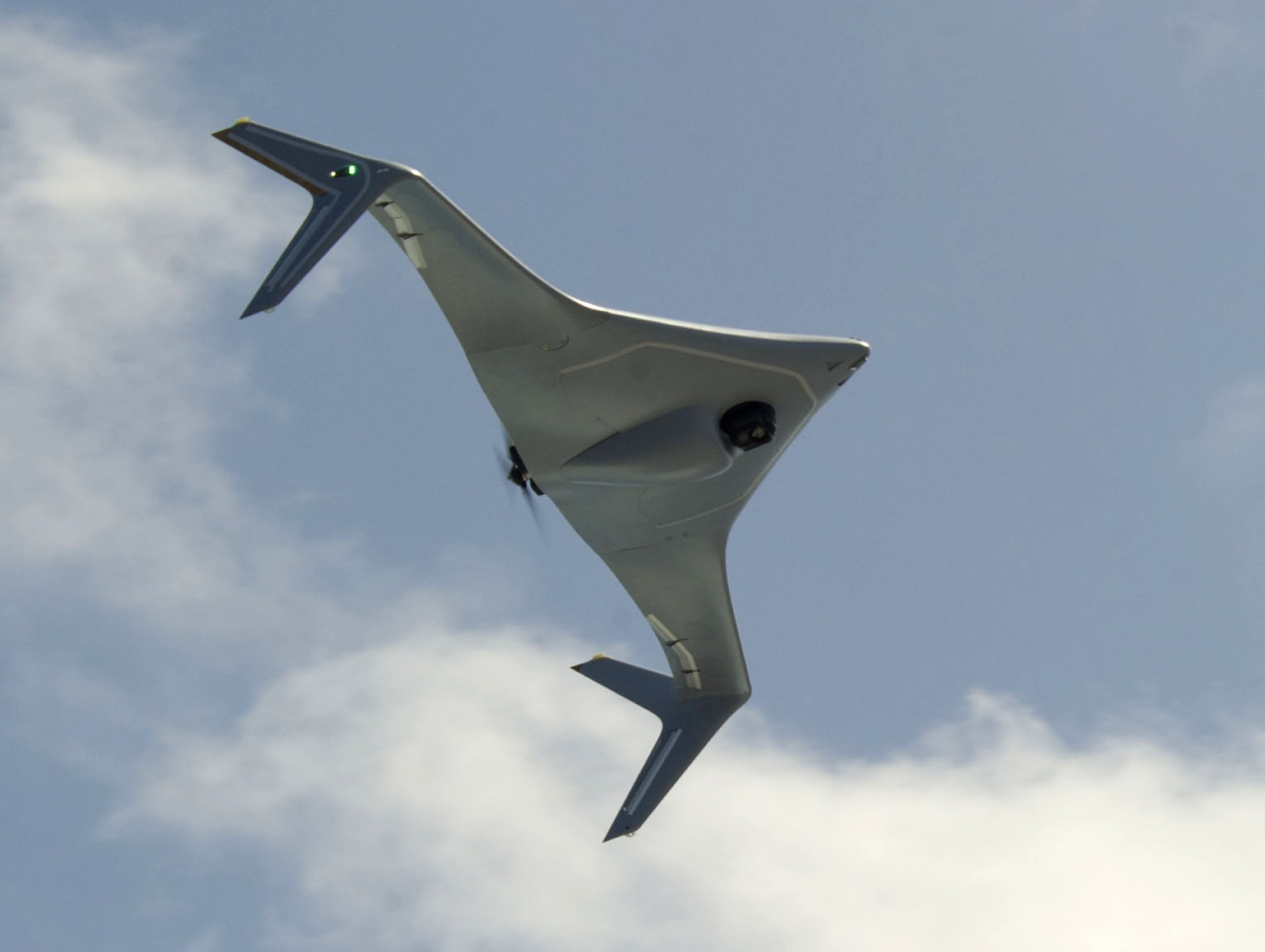

General information
- Type: Reconnaissance UAV
- National origin: United States
- Manufacturer: Northrop Grumman
- Designer: Swift Engineering

History
- First flight: 14 March 2006

The Northrop Grumman Bat is a medium-altitude unmanned air vehicle originally developed for use by the United States Armed Forces. Designed primarily as an intelligence "ISR" gathering tool, the Bat features 30 lb (14 kg) payload capacity and a 10 ft (3.0 m) wing span.

Northrop Grumman received design and marketing rights from Swift Engineering to the Killer Bee, renamed the Bat in April 2009.

The Bat UAS was redeveloped to increase payload carrying capacity and extend range. The latest variant has a wing span of 14 feet (4.3 m) and can carry up to 100 pounds (45 kg) of payload. The Bat "14" UAS has a maximum altitude of 17,000 feet (5.2 km) above sea level and a maximum endurance of 18 hours.

On August 12, 2011, Northrop Grumman won a $26m contract for Sand Dragon B Tier II UAVs able to detect IEDs and roadside bombs.

== Characteristics ==
- The Bat UAS System is packaged for transport into two major assemblies: Launch/Recovery and Air Vehicle/GCS.
- Transportable on MV-22, HUMVEE, C-130 and by helicopter
- Bat UAVs incorporate COTS payloads for reduced costs and ease of maintenance.
- Automatic Recovery is programmed and controlled via autonomous computer and differential GPS using a portable net system.
- Aircraft catapult launcher functions are controlled and monitored by GCS software.

The blended wings merge with the fuselage into a single airfoil to reduce aerodynamic drag, improve fuel economy and increase flight endurance. Made largely of composites, including epoxy/carbon fiber and fiberglass, the airfoil is rigid, providing a structural efficiency which reduces materials and manufacturing costs. With net hooks in the nose and a rear pusher propeller, the craft lands in a mobile retrieval net.

The current Hirth engine with its five-bladed propeller provides a flight time of up to 18 hours. The Bat is designed to have a lower than average visual and radar cross-section profile. A heavy-fuel engine version is also available.

The payload capabilities include still image and real-time video cameras, EO/IR and SAR sensors, Kestrel MTI, laser range finders, laser designators, infrared cameras, communication relays, IED detection, radar jamming EW, chemical and biological detection systems, psy ops, and flare dispensers.

== Uses ==
The Bat UAS can carry numerous types of payloads for collecting intelligence, including still image and real time video cameras, EO/IR and SAR sensors, laser range finders, laser designators, Infra-Red cameras, communications relay equipment, chemical, biological, and IED detection systems and flare dispensers. The Bat series is offered for surveillance of civil disturbances, borders, pipe- and power-lines, as well as meteorology.

== Specifications (Bat UAS) ==
Data from

General characteristics

- Crew: None
- Length: 12 ft (3.7 m)
- Wingspan: 14 ft (4.3 m)
- Gross weight: 350 lb (159 kg)
- Payload: 75 lb (34 kg)

Performance

- Maximum speed: 104 mph (167 km/h, 90 kn)
- Endurance: 18 hours
- Service ceiling: 17,000 ft (5,200 m)

== See also ==
- Lockheed Martin RQ-170 Sentinel
- Swift Engineering
- Mikoyan Skat
- Sukhoi Okhotnik
