= Boeing Insitu MQ-27 ScanEagle =

Reconnaissance unmanned aerial vehicle

ScanEagle
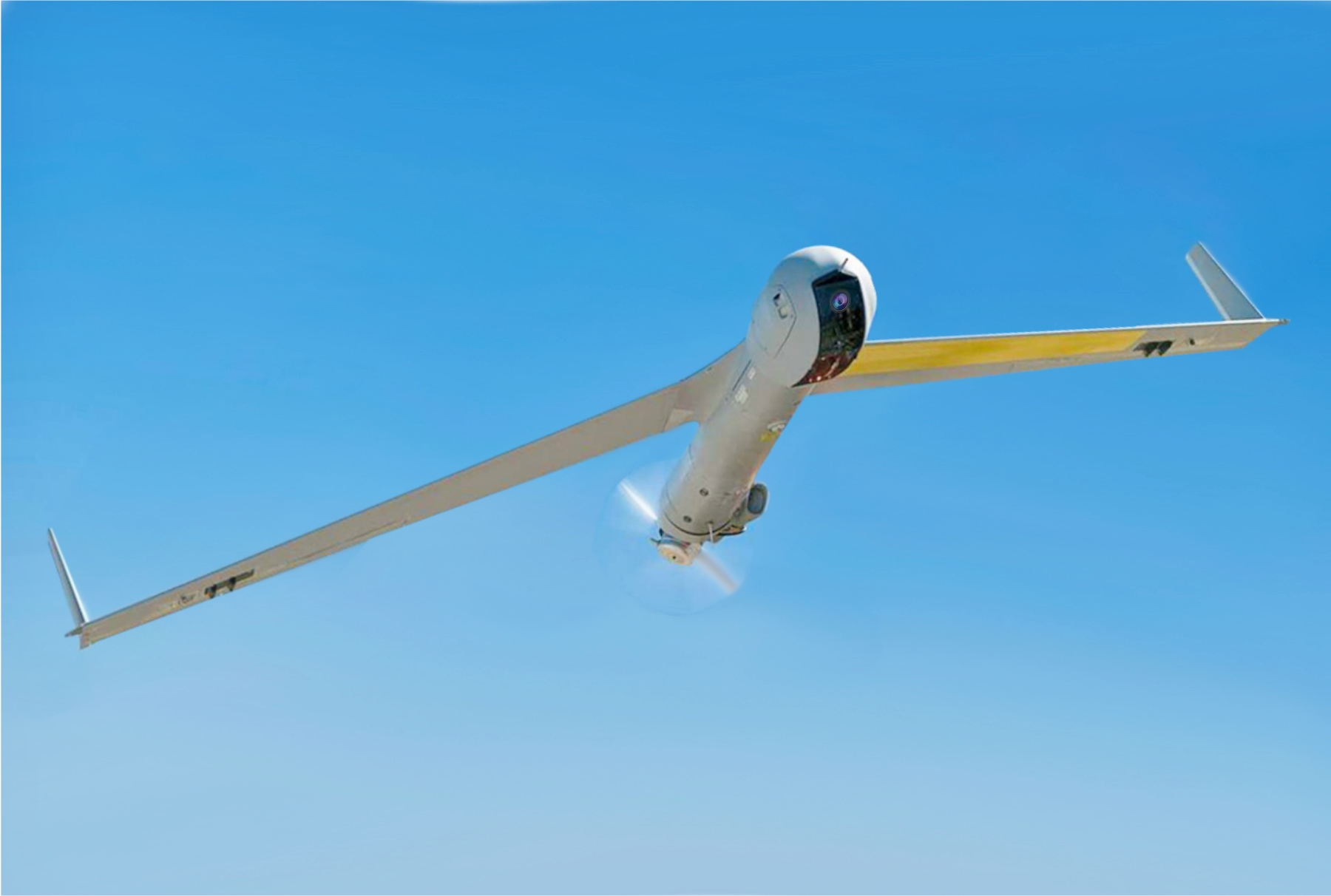
- A ScanEagle flying in 2016

General information
- Type: Small unmanned surveillance and reconnaissance aerial vehicle
- National origin: United States
- Manufacturer: Insitu
- Primary users: United States Navy United States Marine Corps; Royal Australian Navy; See Operators section for others

History
- Manufactured: 2002–present
- Introduction date: 2005 (U.S. Navy)
- First flight: 20 June 2002
- Developed from: Insitu SeaScan
- Developed into: Boeing Insitu RQ-21 Blackjack

The Boeing Insitu ScanEagle is a small, long-endurance, low-altitude unmanned surveillance and reconnaissance aerial vehicle built by Insitu, a subsidiary of Boeing, and is used for reconnaissance. The ScanEagle was designed by Insitu based on the Insitu SeaScan, a commercial UAV that was intended for fish-spotting. The ScanEagle continues to receive improvements through upgrades and changes.

== Design and development ==
ScanEagle is a descendant of another Insitu UAV, the Insitu SeaScan, which was conceived of as a remote sensor for collecting weather data as well as helping commercial fishermen locate and track schools of tuna. ScanEagle emerged as the result of a strategic alliance between Boeing and Insitu. The resulting technology has been successful as a portable Unmanned Aerial System (UAS) for autonomous surveillance in the battlefield, and has been deployed since August 2004 in the Iraq War.

ScanEagle carries a stabilized electro-optical and/or infrared camera on a lightweight inertial stabilized turret system, and an integrated communications system having a range of over 62 miles (100 km); it has a flight endurance of over 20 hours. ScanEagle has a 10.2-foot (3.1 m) wingspan a length of 4.5 feet (1.4 m) and a mass of 44 pounds (20 kg) and can operate up to 80 knots (92 mph; 150 km/h), with an average cruising speed of 48 knots (55 mph; 89 km/h). Block D aircraft featured a higher-resolution camera, a custom-designed Mode C transponder and a new video system. A Block D aircraft, flying at Boeing's test range in Boardman, Oregon, set a type endurance record of 22 hours, 8 minutes.

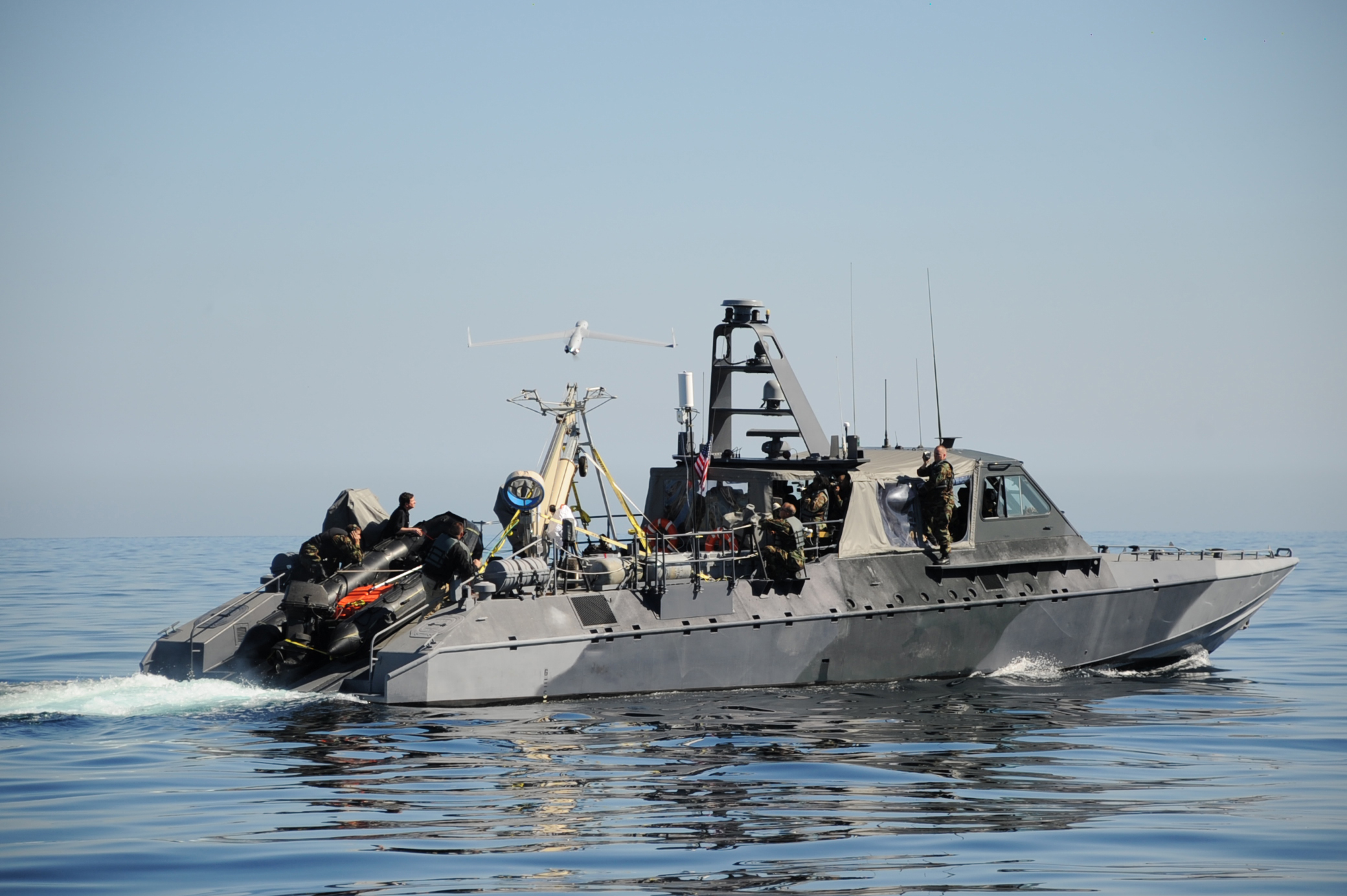
Sea-borne launch from a Mark V Special Operations Craft

ScanEagle needs no airfield for deployment. Instead, it is launched using a pneumatic launcher, patented by Insitu, known as the "SuperWedge" launcher. It is recovered using the "Skyhook" retrieval system, which uses a hook on the end of the wingtip to catch a rope hanging from a 30-to-50-foot (9.1 to 15.2 m) pole. This is made possible by high-quality differential GPS units mounted on the top of the pole and UAV. The rope is attached to a shock cord to reduce stress on the airframe imposed by the abrupt stop. NavtechGPS worked with the manufacturer of the GPS receiver system to enable the system to work in different environments, expanding the capabilities of the UAS for different mission types and areas of the world. The GPS receiver system NavtechGPS designed for the ScanEagle is still in use today.

Each ScanEagle system costs US$3.2 million (2006). A complete system comprises four air vehicles or AVs, a ground control station, remote video terminal, the SuperWedge launch system and Skyhook recovery system.

=== Improvements ===
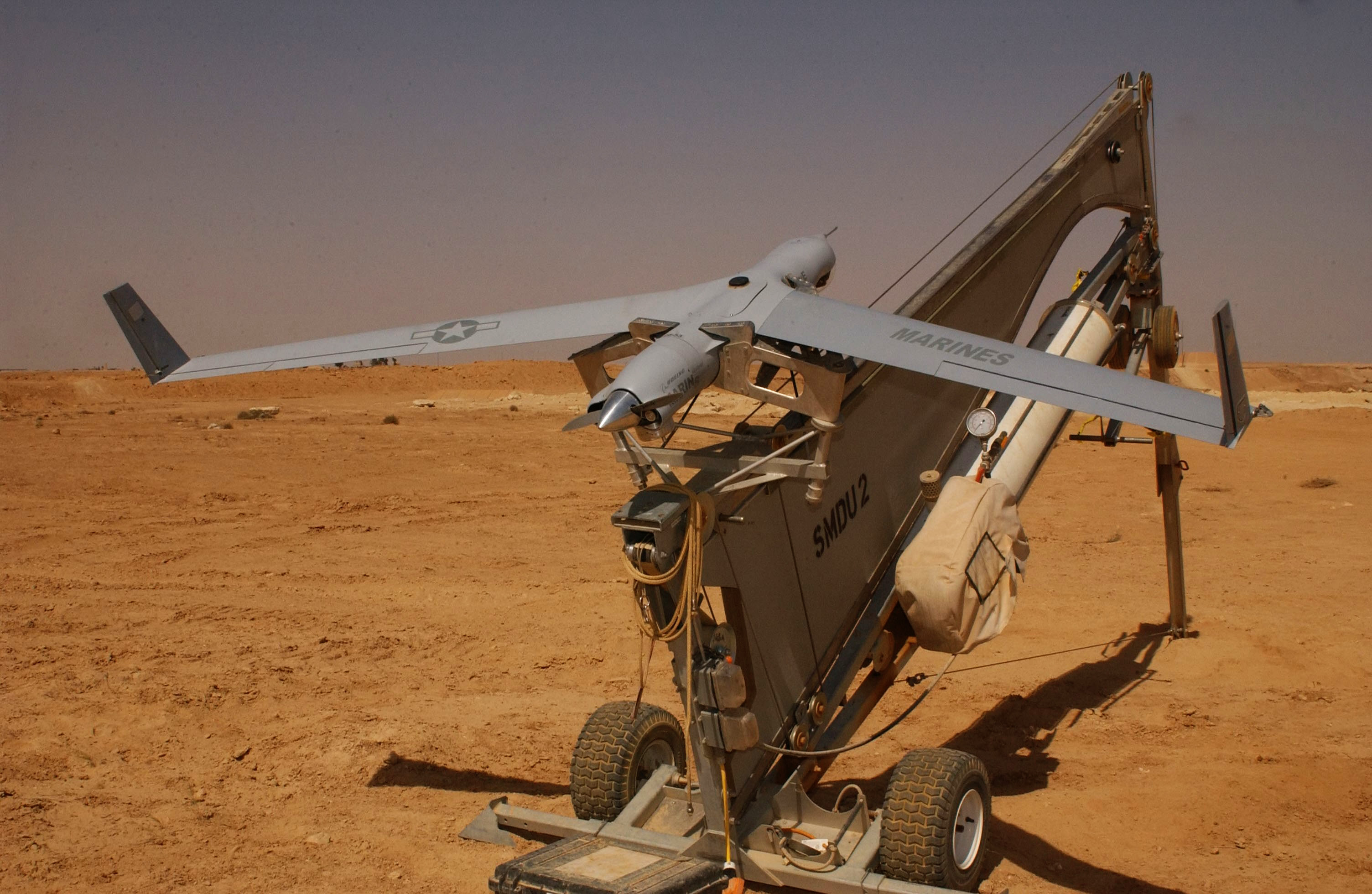
A ScanEagle in its catapult launcher

On 18 March 2008, Boeing, with ImSAR and Insitu successfully flight-tested a ScanEagle with ImSAR's NanoSAR A radar mounted aboard. The ImSAR NanoSAR is the world's smallest Synthetic Aperture Radar, weighs 3.5 lb (1.6 kg) and is 100 cubic inches (1.6 litres) in volume. It is designed to provide high quality real-time ground imaging through adverse weather conditions or other battlefield obscurants.

In 2009, Insitu announced the NightEagle, a modified ScanEagle Block E with an infrared camera for night operations.

In August 2010, Boeing announced plans to control ScanEagles from control stations on E-3A AWACS aircraft and on the V-22.

In July 2011, a team of two ScanEagles and another UAV cooperated to search and navigate a mountain area autonomously.

Insitu introduced an improved ScanEagle 2 variant in October 2014 that has a new purpose-built heavy-fuel engine for increased reliability, which increases electrical power but decreases endurance to 16 hours. It also has a larger nose to carry day and night sensors at the same time, an increased payload, and heavier empty and max take-off weights; wingspan, service ceiling, and cruise and top speed remain the same. Other upgrades include a fully digital video system, a better navigation system, Ethernet-based architecture and reduced Electronic Magnetic Interference (EMI), and a new ground control station while using the same launcher and skyhook recovery system. The ScanEagle 2 was made to appeal to the growing commercial UAV market and orders will start being taken in 2015, either newly built or as an upgrade for existing ScanEagle aircraft.

In 2014, Insitu began development of the Flying Launch and Recovery System (FLARES), a system designed to launch and recover the ScanEagle without the need to transport and assemble the launch catapult and recovery crane. "It consists of second, quadrotor UAV that carries the ScanEagle vertically and releases it into forward flight. For recovery, the quadrotor hovers trailing a cable that it captures, as it would the cable from the SkyHook crane." FLARES incorporates the VTOL advantages of launch and recovery in confined areas, as well as eliminating the rail and crane equipment, with the flying efficiency of a fixed-wing body. Demonstrations of the system took place from late 2014 to mid-2015, and low-rate production is scheduled for late 2016.

In November 2015, a Royal Australian Navy ScanEagle tested Sentient Vision Systems’s ViDAR optical detection system, turning the UAV into a broad area maritime surveillance (BAMS) asset capable of covering up to 80 times more area in a single sortie than is possible with standard cameras. The self-contained ViDAR system consists of high-resolution digital video cameras and software that analyses image feed and autonomously detects, tracks, and photographs each contact with a 180-degree pan. It can be incorporated into the ScanEagle as two fuselage slices, ahead of and behind the wing, without affecting performance. The ViDAR can cover an area greater than 13,000 square nautical miles (17,000 mi^{2}; 45,000 km^{2}) over a 12-hour mission, and detected small and large surface, air, and even submerged targets during the demonstration.

The Scaneagle 3 is reportedly ITAR-free, meaning that it can be sold without a US Government weapons export licence.

== Operational history ==
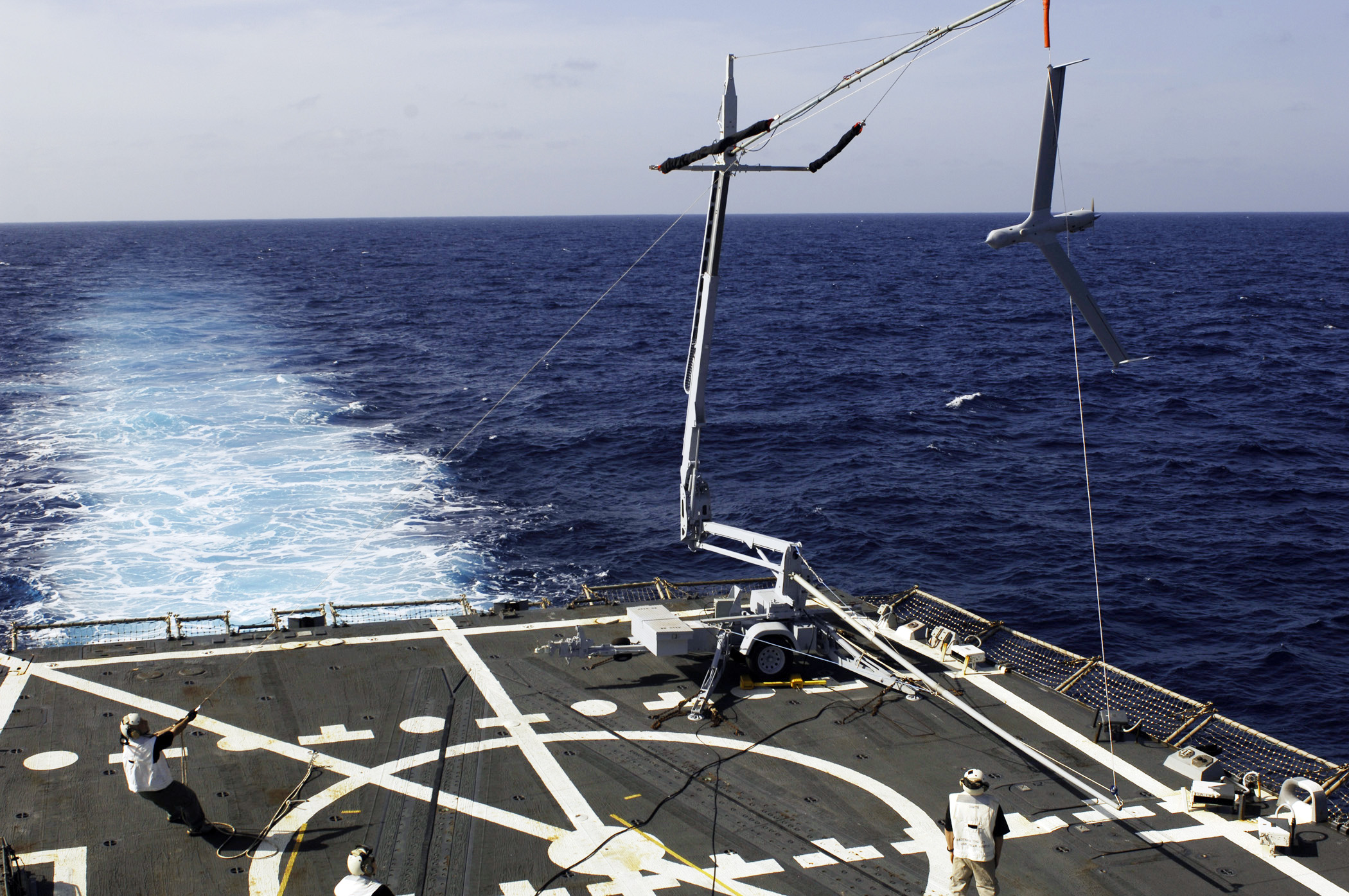
A ScanEagle is recovered at sea aboard the guided-missile destroyer USS Oscar Austin (DDG-79).

The ScanEagle entered service with the U.S. Navy in 2005. In addition to the United States military, the Australian Army also operates the ScanEagle UAV and the Canadian Government also leased the ScanEagle.

On 15 and 16 October 2008, the National Oceanic and Atmospheric Administration (NOAA) conducted three successful test flights of the ScanEagle, launching it from the fisheries and oceanographic research ship NOAAS Oscar Dyson (R 224) in Puget Sound, Washington, flying it remotely from the ship, and recovering it back aboard. In 2009, the NOAA oceanographic research ship NOAAS McArthur II (R 330) began operating a ScanEagle owned by the University of Alaska to monitor the distribution and population of seals in the Bering Sea.

In April 2009, a ScanEagle launched by the U.S. Navy was used during the stand-off between the U.S. Navy and a lifeboat controlled by pirates holding Captain Richard Phillips of the MV Maersk Alabama in the Indian Ocean after a failed hijack attempt.

Insitu announced that the ScanEagle had totaled 500,000 combat flight hours and over 56,000 sorties by July 2011.

In September 2011, Insitu revealed the ScanEagle had been employed by the U.S. Navy in Operation Unified Protector during the 2011 Libyan Revolution. The UAV was launched and recovered by the destroyer USS Mahan (DDG-72) to provide video imagery over three days that located "contacts of interest that no one else could find," which was relayed to the ship and then to the NATO command center by the secure video injection system.

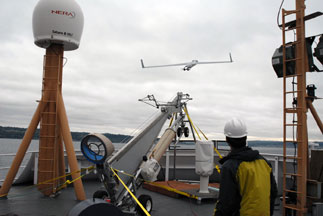
A ScanEagle is launched from NOAAS Oscar Dyson (R 224) in Puget Sound in mid-October 2008.

In late May 2013, the U.S. Coast Guard used a ScanEagle to seize over 1,000 lb (450 kg) of cocaine from a fast boat in the eastern Pacific. The ScanEagle was being deployed off the USCGC Bertholf (WMSL-750) during demonstrations to assess UAV use in the Coast Guard. The aircraft was able to maintain visual surveillance of the boat until a cutter was able to interdict the vessel, marking the first time a UAV deployed from a Coast Guard cutter participated in drug interdiction. The trials in May lasted two weeks with 90 flight hours completed. The Coast Guard hopes to begin purchases of unmanned aerial systems by FY 2016, with small UAVs deployed from its National Security Cutter fleet by the following year. Long-term goals are to use unmanned systems to augment their manned fleet, while UAVs on offshore patrol cutters would replace medium endurance cutters.

On 26 July 2013, the ScanEagle became one of the first unmanned aerial vehicles to be granted certification by the Federal Aviation Administration to fly in U.S. airspace for commercial purposes. ScanEagles will be deployed to Alaska off a ship for ConocoPhillips to scout for icebergs and count whales, protecting drilling platforms and fulfilling environmental requirements. The ScanEagle can safely accomplish observation missions in hazardous Arctic locations, which is safer, cheaper, and more environmentally friendly than using manned aircraft. Commercial certification was the result of previous military certification and the Congressionally mandated opening of airspace over much of Alaska to small UAVs. Only four ScanEagles were certified with strict requirements: only one aircraft of the type is allowed airborne at any one time, they cannot fly through clouds or icing conditions, and they cannot take off or land during certain gust and wind conditions. The certifications did not mention line-of-sight control. On 12 September 2013, a ScanEagle with ConocoPhillips conducted its first flight from a research vessel and flew for 36 minutes. On its second flight, the aircraft experienced engine failure. It aborted the flight and landed in the water, as it was programmed to. A boat recovered the downed ScanEagle.

In July 2016, IHS Janes reported that Royal Navy frigates will cease operating the ScanEagle by November 2017. It will likely be replaced by an unknown UAS, chosen through the Royal Navy's Unmanned Warrior exercise in 2016.

The Yemeni Air Force ordered 12 ScanEagles that were never delivered due to the ongoing Yemeni Civil War.

On 19 August 2022 the U.S. announced it was giving 15 ScanEagles to Ukraine as part of a $775M military weapon aid package to assist in their war with Russia.

=== Iranian capture and reverse engineering claims ===
In December 2012, Iran stated it had captured an American ScanEagle that allegedly violated its airspace over the Persian Gulf. Iran later stated it had also captured two other ScanEagles. The U.S. Navy stated that none of its ScanEagles were missing. Photo evidence of a ScanEagle in Iran showed no U.S. military markings. (ScanEagles operated for U.S Navy by Insitu contractors have no U.S. military markings.) In August 2013, CBC News reported that the Canadian Navy had lost a ScanEagle drone in June 2012. The Navy denied it was obtained by Iran. On 17 December 2012, Iran announced it was starting mass production for a copy of the ScanEagle and has put that UAV into service. Iran later released images of this production line.

In September 2013, a new UAV named Yasir was delivered to Iran's Army ground force; according to Jane's Information Group, the Yasir UAV appears to share the ScanEagle's 1.37 m length and 3.11 m wingspan, although it does have a slightly different twin tail boom and inverted-V tail plane configuration. In unveiling the Yasir, the Commander of the Iranian Army's Ground Forces, Brigadier General Ahmad-Reza Pourdastan, is quoted by the Iranian Fars News Agency as saying it is capable of flying at an altitude of 15,000 ft (4,600 m), has an endurance of 8 hours, and an operational radius of 200 km.

== Variants ==
ScanEagle X200
A civilian-variant with a restricted category type certificate issued by the United States Federal Aviation Administration.
CU-169
Canadian military designation for the ScanEagle.
MQ-27A and MQ-27B
U.S. military designations for the ScanEagle.
ScanEagle RM1
Royal Navy designation for basic military variant.
IAIO Qods Yasir
Often shortened to "Yasir" or referred to as the "Sayed-2", unlicensed Iranian copy developed from multiple captured ScanEagles.

== Operators ==
Map with ScanEagle operators in blue, canceled orders in red and operators of unlicensed reproductions in light blue

Afghanistan

- Afghan National Army
- Military of the Islamic Emirate of Afghanistan

Australia

- Royal Australian Navy
- Australian Army (former)

Brazil

- Brazilian Navy

Bulgaria

- Bulgarian Land Forces

Cameroon

- Cameroonian Army

Canada

- Canadian Army

Colombia

- Colombian Aerospace Force
- Colombian Navy

Czech Republic

- Czech Army

Indonesia

- Indonesian Navy – Eight on order, deliveries expected to be complete by May 2022.

Iraq

- Iraqi Armed Forces

Italy

- Italian Navy

Japan

- Japan Ground Self-Defense Force

Kenya

- Kenya Defence Forces

Lebanon

- Lebanese Air Force – 6 on order, all delivered in April 2019.

Lithuania

- Lithuanian Armed Forces

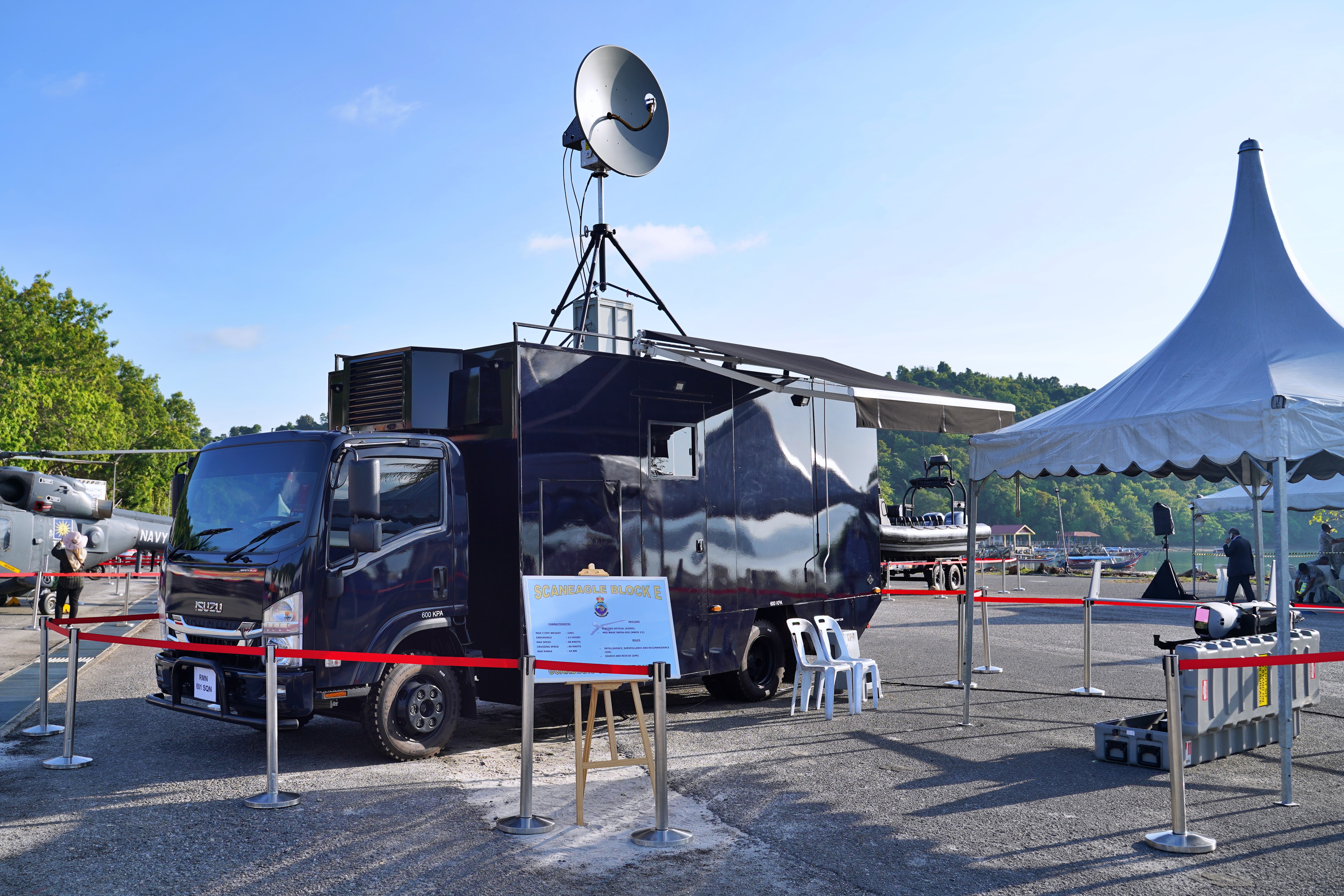
Royal Malaysian Navy's ScanEagle control vehicle in LIMA 2023

Malaysia

- Malaysian Armed Forces

Netherlands

- Royal Netherlands Army

Pakistan

- Pakistan Navy

Philippines

- Armed Forces of the Philippines

Poland

- Polish Armed Forces

Romania

- Romanian Army

Saudi Arabia

- Saudi Arabian Army

Singapore

- Republic of Singapore Navy

Spain

- Spanish Navy

Tunisia

- Tunisian Navy

United States

- United States Air Force
- United States Marine Corps
- United States Navy
- United States Coast Guard
- National Oceanic and Atmospheric Administration

Ukraine

- Armed Forces of Ukraine

Vietnam

- Vietnam People's Navy – six on order as of June 2019.

=== Former operators ===
United Kingdom

- Royal Navy

== Specifications ==
Data from Insitu, USAF, 3W Engines

General characteristics

- Crew: none on-board
- Capacity: 11 lb (5 kg)
- Length: 5 ft 1 in – 5 ft 7 in (1.55–1.71 m)
- Wingspan: 10 ft 2 in (3.11 m)
- Empty weight: 30.90–39.68 lb (14–18 kg)
- Gross weight: 39.7 lb (18 kg)
- Max takeoff weight: 58 lb (26.5 kg)
- Powerplant: 1 × 3W International 2-stroke piston engine , 1.5 hp (1.12 kW)

Performance

- Maximum speed: 80 kn (92 mph, 148 km/h)
- Cruise speed: 60 kn (69 mph, 111 km/h)
- Endurance: 20+ hours
- Service ceiling: 19,500 ft (5,950 m)

Avionics

- Variable visual imaging equipment including:
  - High resolution day/night camera
  - Thermal imaging camera

== See also ==
Related development

- Boeing Insitu RQ-21 Blackjack

Aircraft of comparable role, configuration, and era

- AAI RQ-2 Pioneer

Related lists

- List of active United States military aircraft
