= Sentient Vision Systems =

- Type: Private
- Industry: Computer Vision Software
- Headquarters: Melbourne, Australia
- Products: Automated Object Detection in Full Motion Video
- Number of employees: <50
- Website: SentientVision.com

Sentient Vision Systems is an Australian company headquartered in Port Melbourne, that produces automated object detection services for video from aircraft and surface sensors used for intelligence, surveillance and reconnaissance (ISR), search and rescue, and law enforcement . Sentient's products use computer vision software to detect and track objects of interest, both electro-optic (EO) and infrared (IR) for land and maritime environments. Sentient Vision Systems was acquired by Shield AI in April 2024.

== History ==
Sentient Vision Systems was founded by Dr. Paul Boxer in 2004 to develop computer vision products with a focus on moving target indication (MTI) in video. In 2006, Australia's Defence Science and Technology Organisation (DSTO) awarded Sentient a Capability and Technology Demonstrator (CTD) program which supported development and demonstration of Kestrel Land MTI. A CTD extension and then support from Commercialisation Australia enabled further development and commercialisation, including Kestrel Maritime, an object detection product for maritime environments. Kestrel has been integrated on a range of manned and unmanned aircraft including the Wasp, Raven and Puma UAS's, US Navy Firescout, P3 Orion, NPAS EC135 and RAAF Heron.

Sentient's most recent product, ViDAR (Visual Detection and Ranging), was launched in 2015. ViDAR provides visual wide area search capability acting as an optical radar. ViDAR has been deployed with the Royal Australian Navy (RAN) on a ScanEagle UAS and is in service with the Australian Maritime Safety Authority (AMSA) for search and rescue.

In 2016, Australia's Defence Minister, Christopher Pyne MP, congratulated Sentient for deployment of over 1,000 Kestrel systems worldwide. Sentient was also referenced in the Australian Governments 2016 Defence Industry Policy Statement

In June 2017, The Australian government announced a $100m contract to supply the Army with Wasp AE small UAV's including Sentient's Kestrel.
