= Insitu =

American unmanned aerial systems company

Insitu, Inc.
- Type: Subsidiary
- Industry: Unmanned aerial systems
- Founded: 1994; 32 years ago
- Headquarters: Bingen, Washington, US
- Key people: Diane Rose (president & CEO)
- Products: Unmanned aerial vehicles; payloads; software
- Number of employees: ~1,000 (2022)
- Parent: The Boeing Company 2008‍–‍2026; Archer Aviation 2026‍–‍present
- Website: www.insitu.com

Insitu Inc. is an American company that designs, develops and manufactures unmanned aerial systems (UAS). The company is a wholly owned subsidiary of the Boeing Company, and has several offices in the United States, the United Kingdom, and Australia. Its unmanned aerial vehicle (UAV) platforms—ScanEagle, Integrator, Integrator Extended Range (ER), ScanEagle 3, and RQ-21A Blackjack, have logged 1.3 million operational flight hours as of May 2022.

== History ==
Insitu was founded in 1994 by engineers interested in creating miniature robotic aircraft. It went on to develop the Aerosonde concept for long-range weather reconnaissance. The company derives its name from the process of measuring the atmosphere in situ (in place), as opposed to remotely, by satellite. At the end of the 1990s the company transitioned to the SeaScan concept for imaging reconnaissance from tuna seiners. With the onset of the Iraq War in 2003, SeaScan turned into ScanEagle, and Insitu focused their efforts on military applications. Insitu was acquired by long-time partner Boeing in 2008.

In 2015, it acquired the 2d3 company. In addition to its defense business, the company announced the establishment of its commercial business unit, Insitu Commercial, in 2016.

Insitu was sanctioned by the Chinese government on December 27, 2024 due to arm sales to Taiwan.

On the 10th of August 2026 Insitu was sold to Archer Aviation.

== Products ==
Insitu, with the U.S. Navy, developed the RQ-21A Blackjack to fill the requirement for a small tactical UAS capable of operating from both land and sea. The Integrator is the standard variant of the RQ-21A. Insitu's UAVs are launched via a pneumatic catapult launcher and are recovered using the SkyHook recovery system. Insitu also provides services and training for its UAVs.

Insitu customer documentation is written to the ASD-STE100 standard.

== Gallery ==
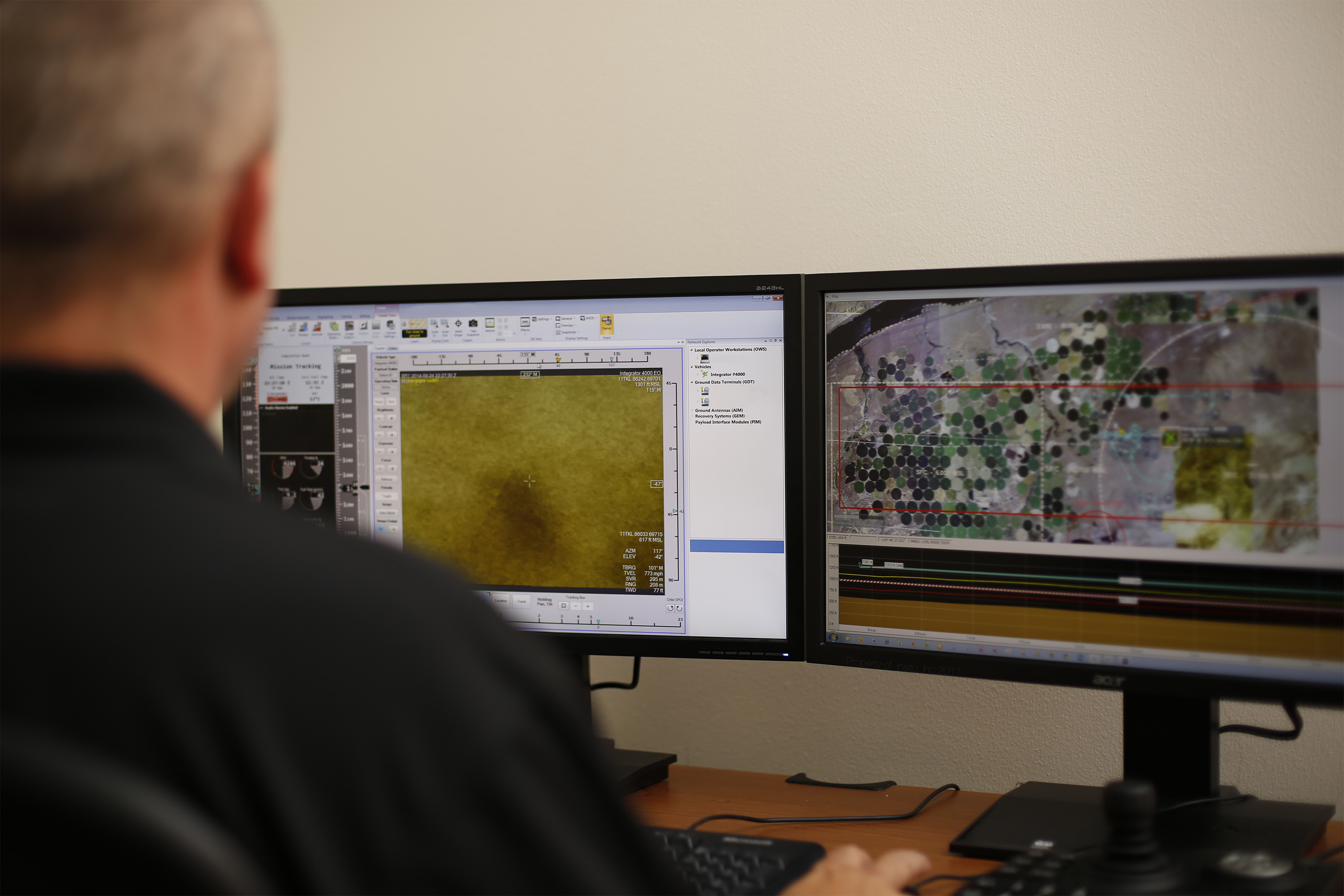
Insitu's Common Open-mission Management Command and Control (ICOMC2) ground control station (GCS) is the core system used for controlling Integrator and providing access for total payload control

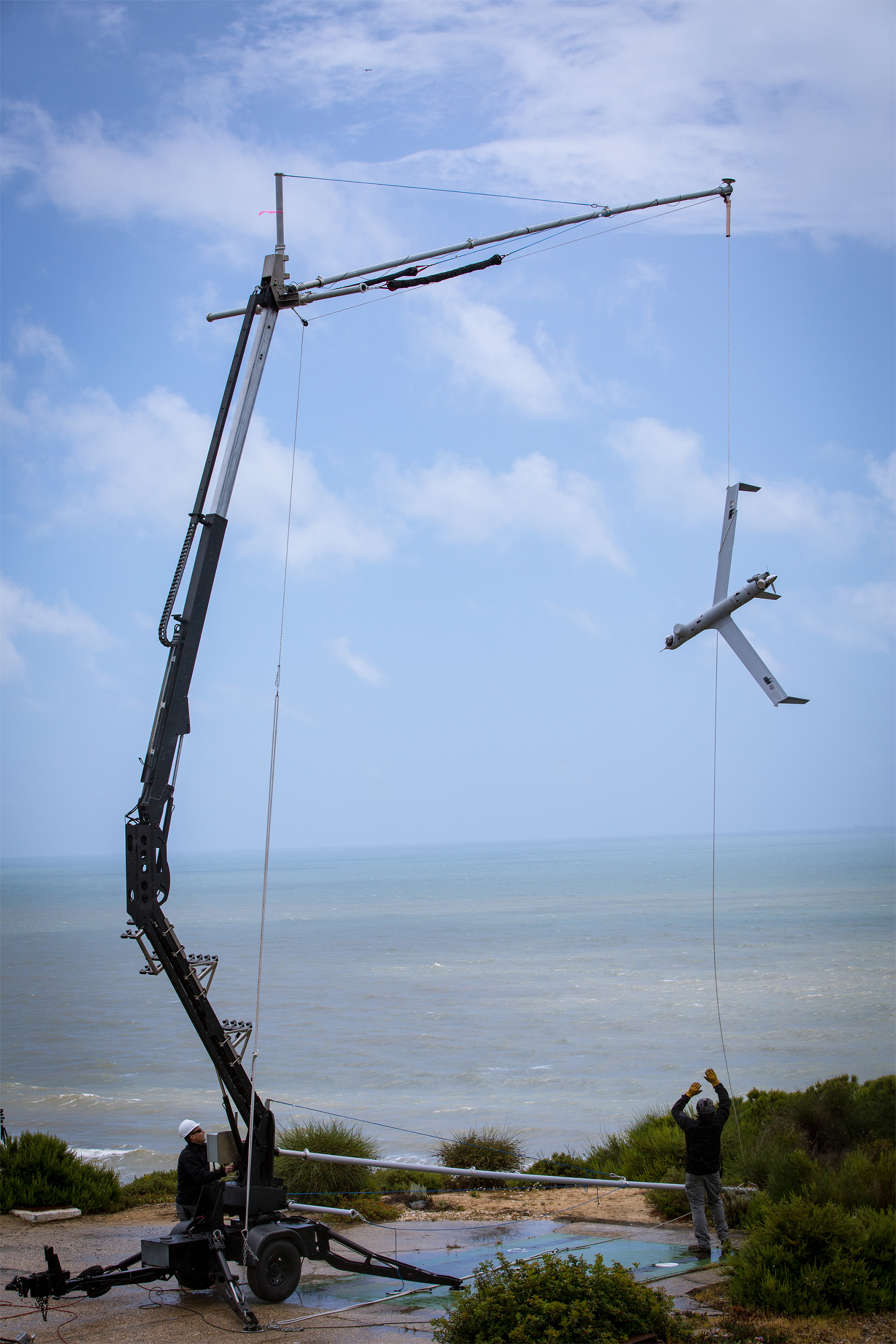
A ScanEagle unmanned aircraft is captured by Insitu's patented SkyHook recovery system

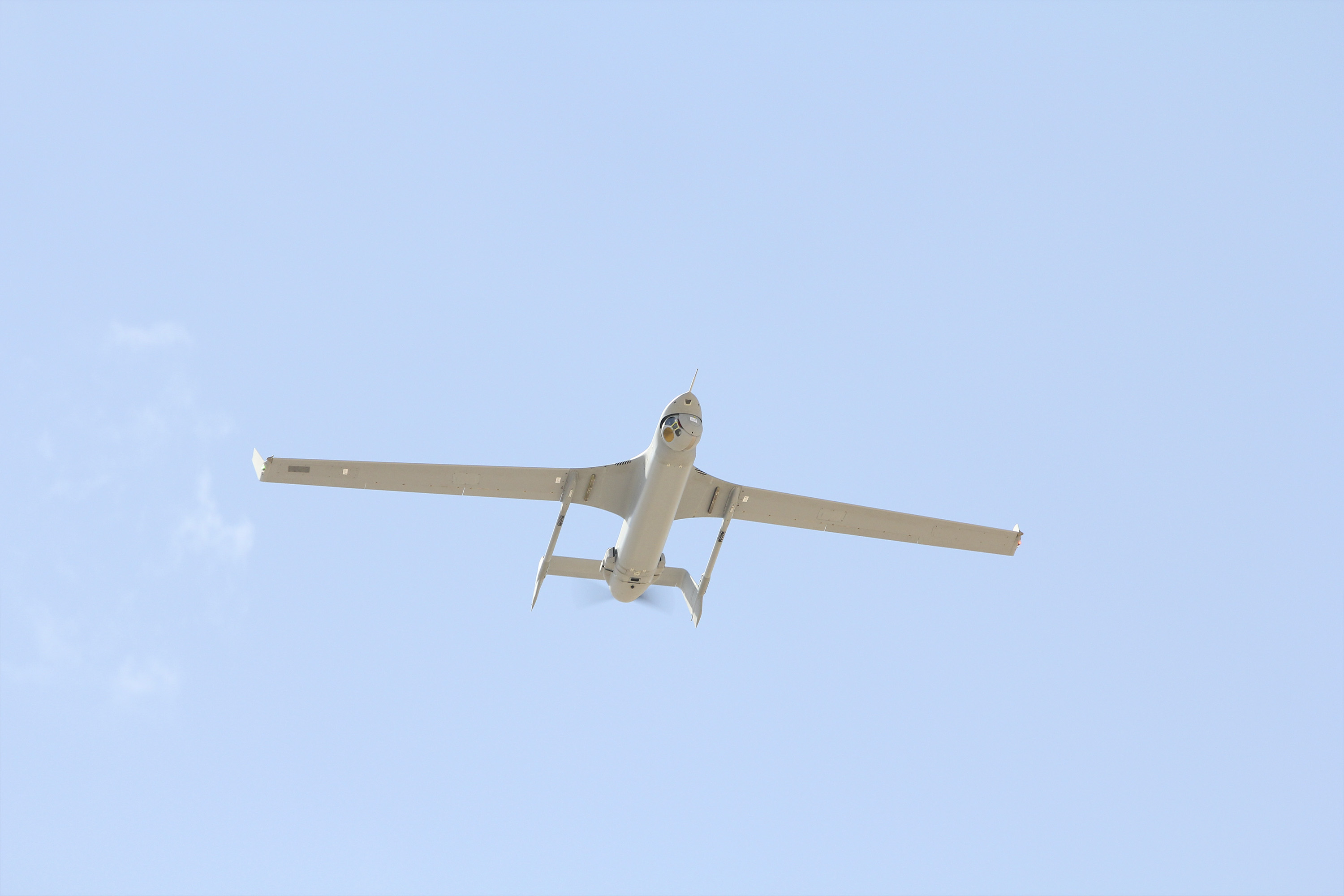
An Integrator UAV takes flight

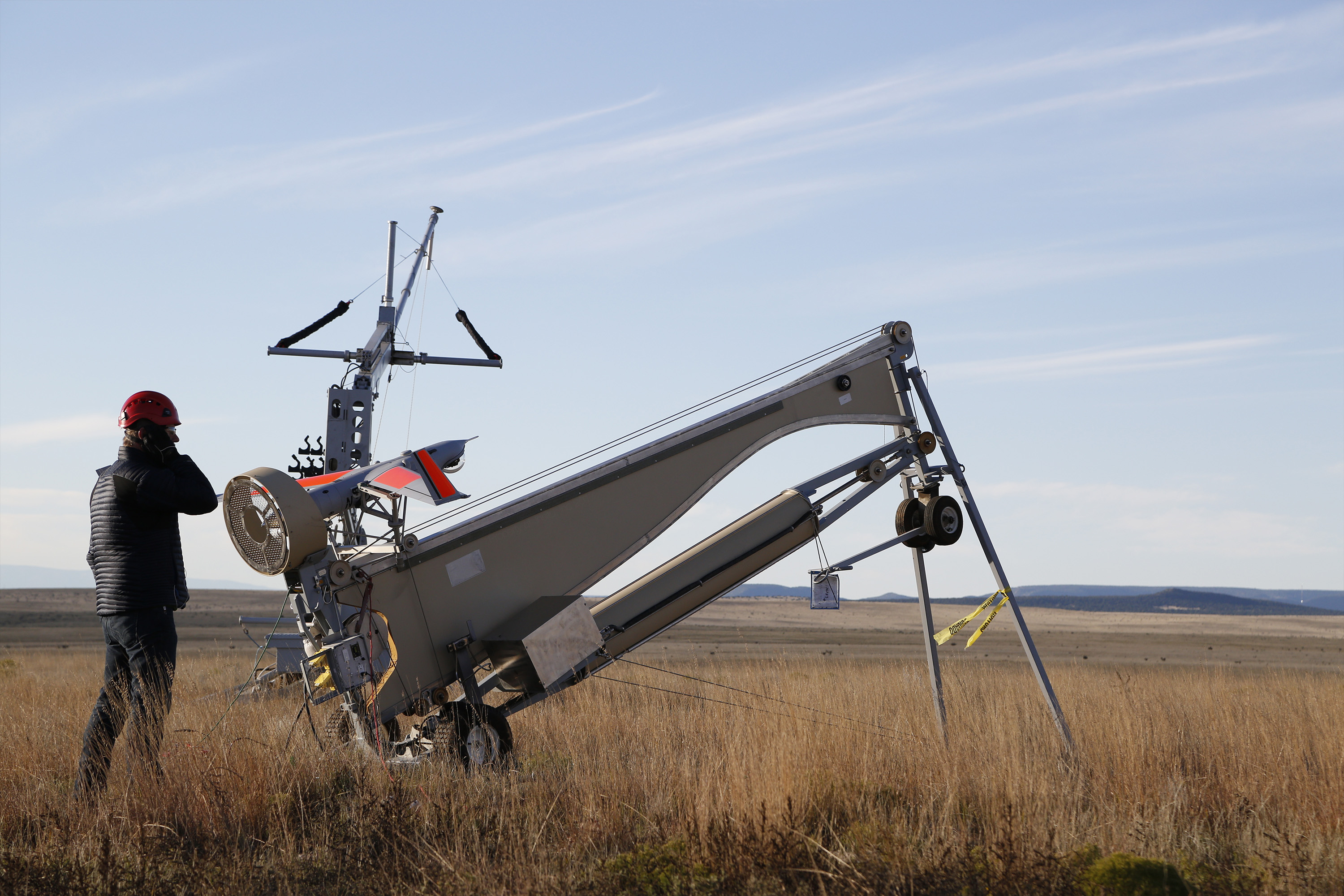
ScanEagle prepares for launch

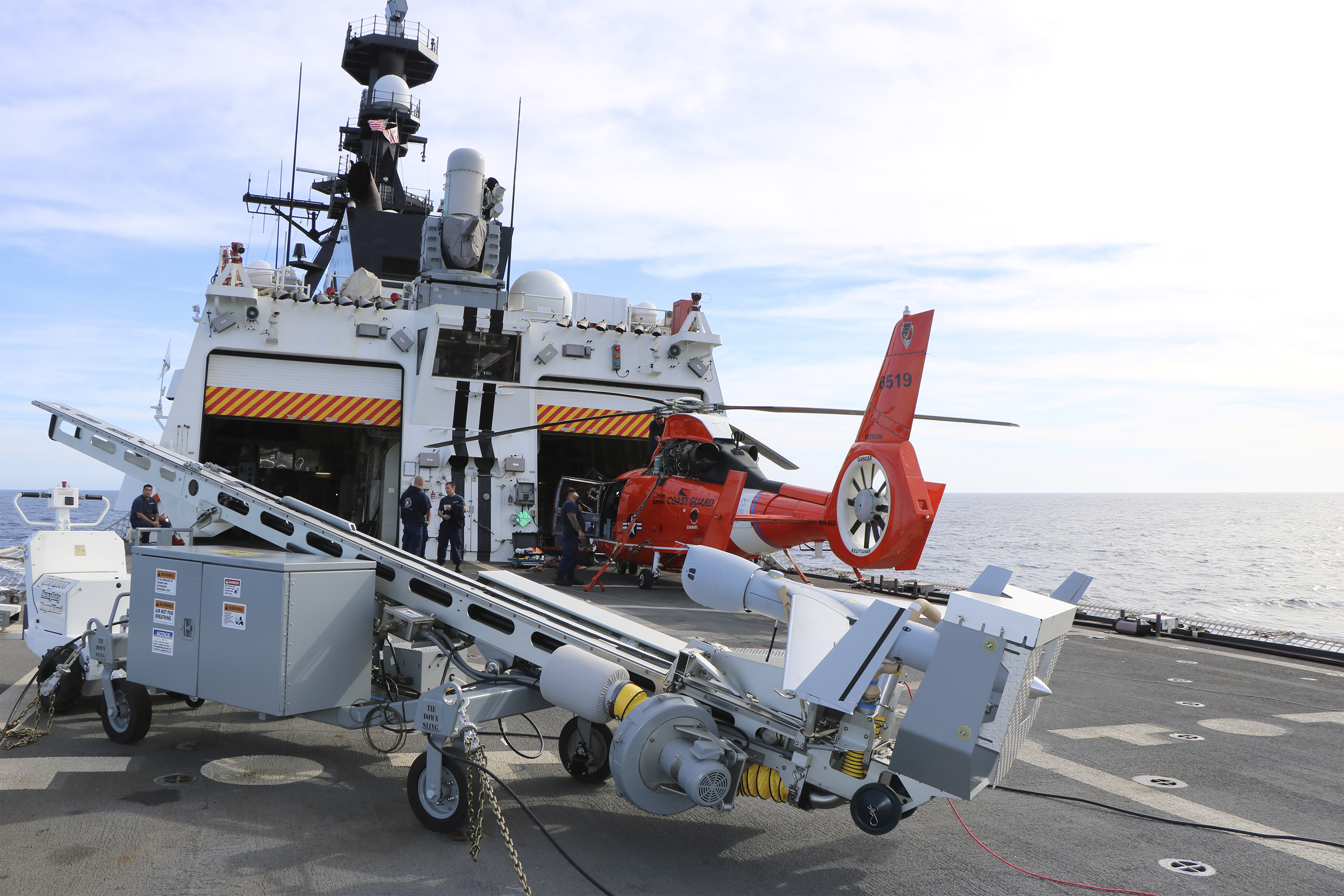
ScanEagle is pictured aboard the U.S. Coast Guard Cutter Stratton, which was the first U.S. Coast Guard Cutter to deploy fully equipped with a small UAS for an entire patrol.
