= CDL =

CDL may refer to:

== In general ==
- AD 450, a year in the Common Era, rendered as "CDL" in Roman numerals
- 450 (number), rendered as "CDL" in Roman numerals

== People ==
- Chancellor of the Duchy of Lancaster, a senior appointment in the British cabinet
- Chief of Defence Logistics, formerly a senior appointment in the British Armed Forces

== Places ==
- Chodiala railway station (station code CDL), Saharanpur, Uttar Pradesh, India; a train station
- Carbondale station (station code CDL), Carbondale, Illinois, USA; a train station
- Candle 2 Airport (IATA airport code CDL), Candle, Alaska, USA; see List of airports in Alaska

== Groups, Organizations, Companies ==
- California Digital Library
- Call of Duty League, a professional esports league for the video game series Call of Duty
- Canadian Defence Lawyers
- House of Freedoms (CdL, Italian: Casa delle Libertà), a former political alliance in Italy
- CCAir (ICAO airline code CDL), a U.S. airline
- Liberal Democratic Centre (CDL, Spanish: Centro Democrático Liberal), a former political party in Spain
- China Democratic League, a social liberal political party in China
- Christian Defense League, American white supremacist group
- Chung Dahm Learning, is an English language institute in South Korea
- Citadel Broadcasting Corporation stock ticker until early 2010
- Citizens for Decency through Law, pro-censorship advocacy body
- City Developments Limited, a Singapore-based international real estate development company
- College du Leman, a Swiss boarding and day school

== Transport and vehicular ==
- Canal Defence Light, a World War 2 British secret weapon, an armoured vehicle
- Configuration Deviation List, see List of aviation, aerospace and aeronautical abbreviations
- Commercial driver's license, for commercial motor vehicles (trucks, buses etc.)

== Computing, software, electronics ==
- Character Description Language
- Color Decision List
- Common Data Link
- Compiler Description Language, to develop computer compilers
- Command Language Definition of DCL
- Controlled digital lending, a model of digital library
- Common Data Language, a human-readable text representation of netCDF data

== Other uses ==
- Child-directed language, or baby talk
- Container-deposit legislation, any law that requires the collection of a monetary deposit on beverage containers

== See also ==
- 450 in Roman numerals "CDL"
- CD1
- CDI (disambiguation)
- 450 (disambiguation), rendered as CDL in roman numerals
