= AAI RQ-7 Shadow =

American unmanned aerial vehicle

RQ-7 Shadow
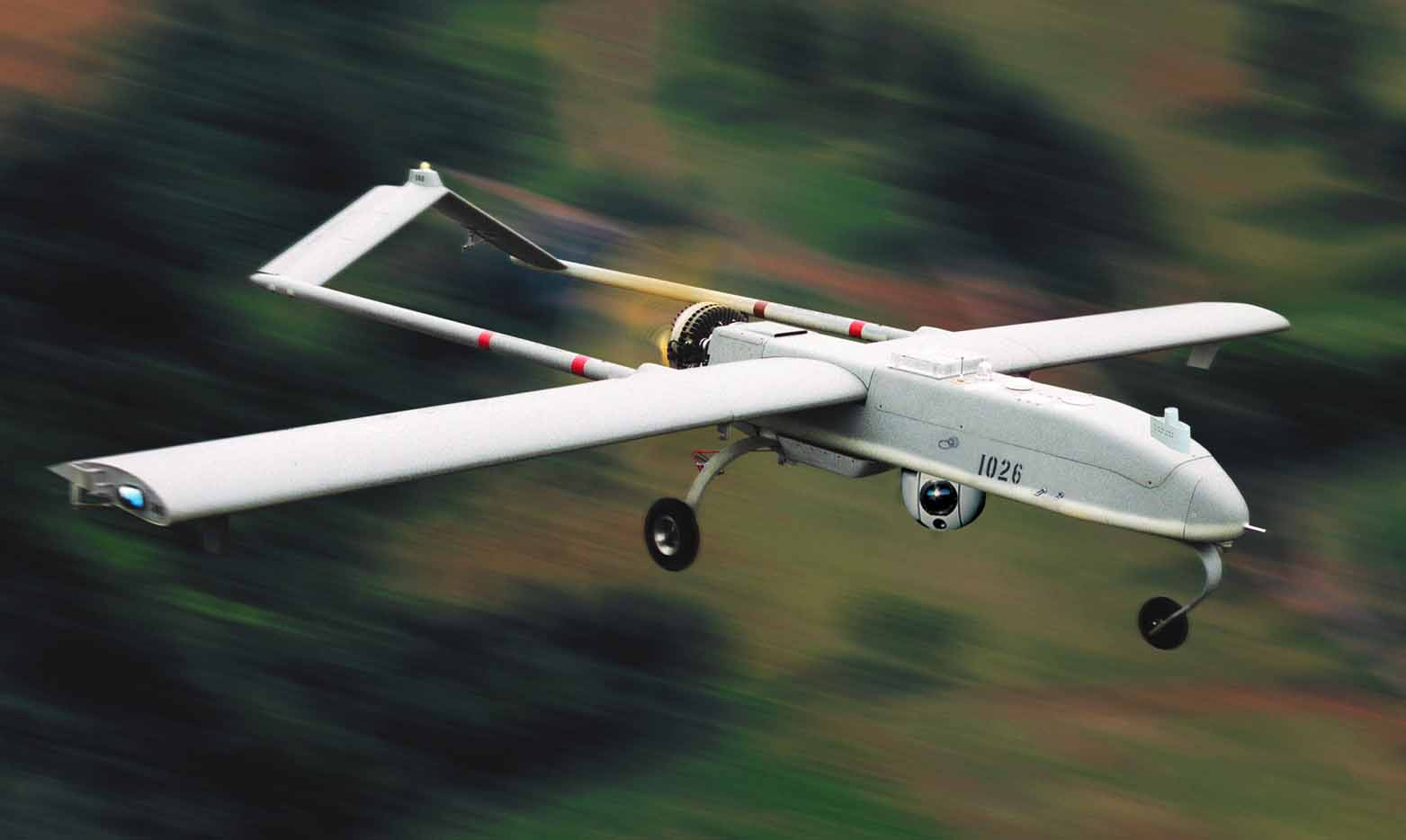
- A Shadow UAS in flight

General information
- Type: Tactical reconnaissance UAS for ground maneuver forces Unmanned combat aerial vehicle (optionally)
- Manufacturer: AAI Corporation
- Status: Active, in production
- Primary users: United States Army 9 other users
- Number built: 500+

History
- Introduction date: 2002
- First flight: 1991
- Developed from: AAI RQ-2 Pioneer

The AAI RQ-7 Shadow is an American unmanned aerial vehicle (UAV) used by the United States Army, Australian Army, Swedish Army, Turkish Air Force and Italian Army for reconnaissance, surveillance, and target acquisition and battle damage assessment. Launched from a trailer-mounted pneumatic catapult, it is recovered with the aid of arresting gear similar to jets on an aircraft carrier. Its gimbal-mounted, digitally stabilized, liquid nitrogen-cooled electro-optical/infrared (EO/IR) camera relays video in real time via a C-band line-of-sight data link to the ground control station (GCS).

The US Army's 2nd Battalion, 13th Aviation Regiment at Fort Huachuca, Arizona, trains soldiers, Marines, and civilians in the operation and maintenance of the Shadow UAS. The Shadow is operated in the U.S. Army at brigade-level.

== Development ==
The RQ-7 Shadow is the result of a continued US Army search for an effective battlefield UAS after the cancellation of the Alliant RQ-6 Outrider aircraft. AAI Corporation followed up their RQ-2 Pioneer with the Shadow 200, a similar, more refined UAS. In late 1999, the army selected the Shadow 200 to fill the tactical UAS requirement, redesignating it the RQ-7. Army requirements specified a UAS that used an aviation gasoline engine, could carry an electro-optic/infrared imaging sensor turret, and had a maximum range of 31 miles (50 kilometers) with four-hour, on-station endurance. The Shadow 200 offered at least twice that range. The specifications also dictated that UAS would be able to land in an athletic field.

== Design ==
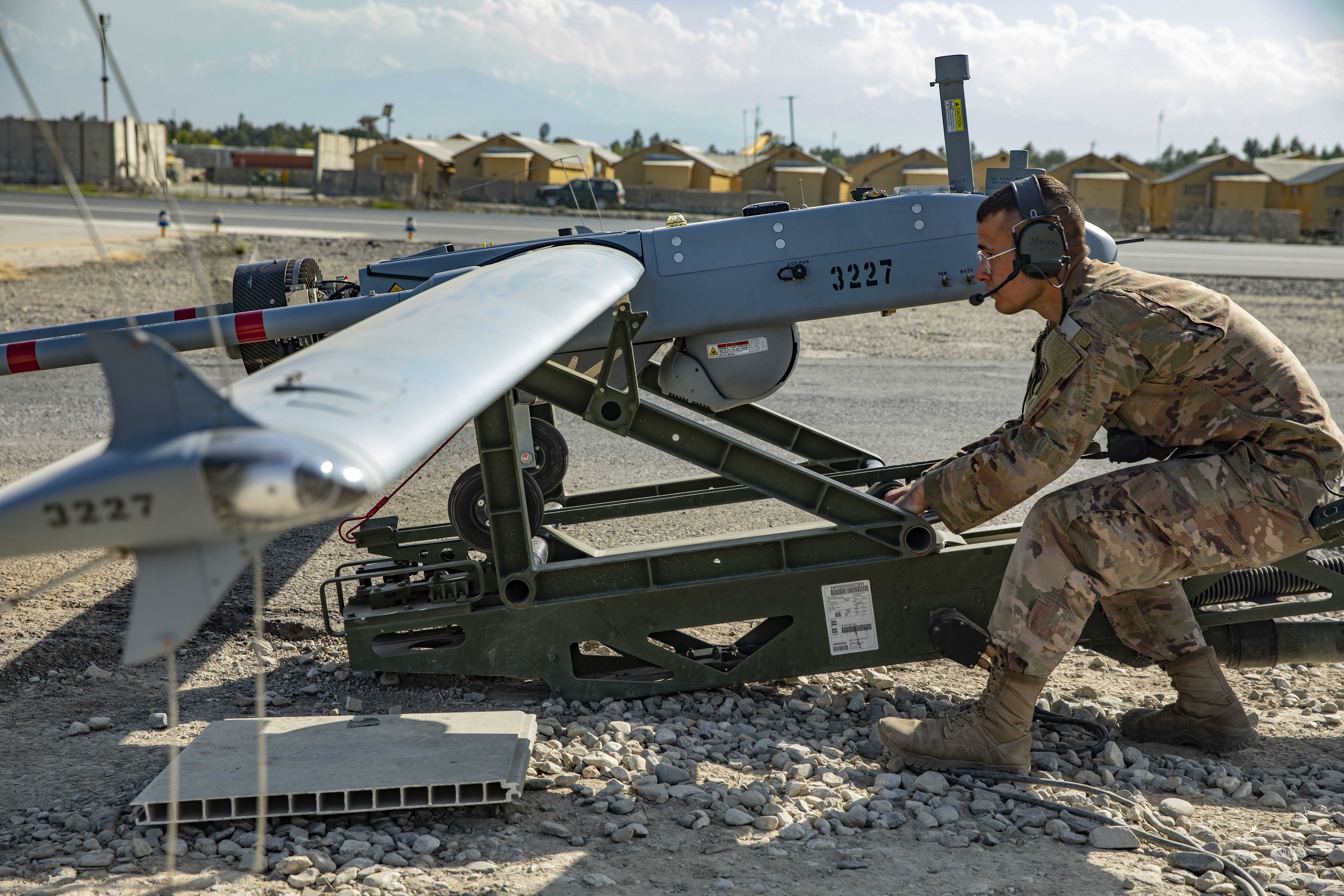
Soldier performing pre-flight inspections on a RQ-7B Shadow in Afghanistan, 2019

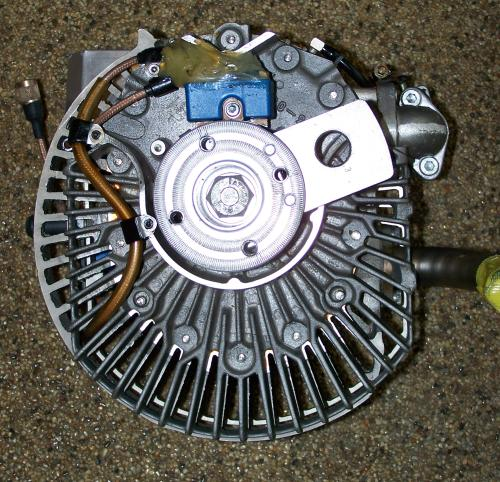
UEL UAV-741 Wankel engine used in RQ-7 Shadow

The RQ-7 Shadow 200 unmanned aircraft system is of a high-wing, constant chord pusher configuration with a twin-tailboom empennage and an inverted v-tail. The aircraft is powered by a 38 bhp (28 kW) AR741-1101 Wankel engine designed and manufactured by UAV Engines Ltd in the United Kingdom. Onboard electrical systems are powered by a GEC/Plessey 28 volt, direct current, 2 kW generator.

Currently, the primary load of the aircraft is the Israeli Aircraft Industries POP300 Plug-in Optical Payload which consists of a forward-looking infrared camera, a daytime TV camera with a selectable near-infrared filter and a laser pointer. The aircraft has fixed tricycle landing gear. Takeoffs are assisted by a trailer-mounted pneumatic launcher which can accelerate the 170 kg (375 pound) aircraft to 70 knots (130 km/h) in 40 feet (12 m).

Landings are guided by a Tactical Automatic Landing System, developed by the Sierra Nevada Corporation, which consists of a ground-based micro-millimeter wavelength radar and a transponder carried on the aircraft. Once on the ground, a tailhook mounted on the aircraft catches an arresting wire connected to two disk brake drums which can stop the aircraft in less than 170 feet (52 m).

The aircraft is part of a larger system which currently uses the M1152-series of Humvees for ground transport of all ground and air equipment. A Shadow 200 system consists of four aircraft, three of which are transported in the Air Vehicle Transporter (AVT). The fourth is transported in a specially designed storage container to be used as a spare. The AVT also tows the launcher.

The AVT Support Vehicle and trailer contain extra equipment to launch and recover the aircraft, such as the Tactical Automatic Landing System. Maintenance equipment for the aircraft is stored in the Maintenance Section Multifunctional (MSM) vehicle and trailer as well as the M1165 MSM Support Vehicle and its associated trailer.

Two Humvee-mounted Ground Control Stations (GCS), also part of the Shadow 200 system, control the aircraft in flight. Each station has an associated Ground Data Terminal (GDT), which takes commands generated by the GCS and modulates them into radio waves received by the aircraft in flight. The GDT receives video imagery from the payload, as well as telemetry from the aircraft, and sends this information to the GCS.

A trailer, towed by the M1165 GCS support vehicle, carries the GDT and houses a 10 kW Tactical Quiet Generator to provide power for its associated GCS. The Shadow 200 system also includes a Portable Ground Control Station (PGCS) and Portable Ground Data Terminal (PGDT), which are stripped-down versions of the GCS and GDT designed as a backup to the two GCSs.

A fielded Shadow 200 system requires 22 soldiers to operate it. Army modelling indicates that crew workload is highest at takeoff, and second-highest at landing.

The Shadow is restricted from operating in bad weather conditions, not being meant to fly through rain and with sensors that cannot see through clouds.

== Operational history ==
=== Service with the United States ===
By July 2007, the Shadow platform accumulated 200,000 flight hours, doubling its previous record of 100,000 hours in 13 months. The system then surpassed 300,000 flight hours in April 2008, and by May 2010, the Shadow system had accumulated over 500,000 flight hours. As of 2011, the Shadow had logged over 709,000 hours. The Shadow platform has flown over 37,000 sorties in support of operations in Iraq and Afghanistan by US Army and Army National Guard units.

On 6 August 2012, AAI announced that the Shadow had achieved 750,000 flight hours during more than 173,000 missions. More than 900,000 flight hours had been logged by Shadow UAVs by the end of June 2014.

The Shadow did not see service in the Afghanistan campaign of 2001–2002, but it did fly operational missions in support of Operation Iraqi Freedom. The operating conditions in Iraq proved hard on the UAVs, with heat and sand leading to engine failures, resulting in a high-priority effort to find fixes with changes in system technology and operating procedures. Shadow UAS have since flown more than 600,000 combat hours in support of the Wars in Iraq and Afghanistan.

In 2007, the United States Marine Corps began to transition from the RQ-2 Pioneer to the RQ-7 Shadow. VMU-1, VMU-2 completed their transition from the RQ-2 to the RQ-7 and ScanEagle while VMU-3 and VMU-4 were activated as Shadow and ScanEagle elements. VMU-3 was activated on 12 September 2008 and VMU-4 conducted its inaugural flight on 28 September 2010 in Yuma, Arizona. In October 2007, VMU-1 became the first Marine Corps squadron to see combat in Iraq. VMU-2 deployed a Shadow detachment to Afghanistan in 2009, with VMU-3 following in January 2010.

The Navy provided personnel for four Shadow platoons in support of army brigades deployed in Iraq. The first two platoons returned from 6-month tours in Iraq in January and February 2008. The Navy personnel went through the Army's training program at Fort Huachuca, Arizona.

The U.S. Army is implementing a plan to reform its aerial scout capabilities by scrapping its fleet of OH-58 Kiowa helicopters from 2015 to 2019 and replacing them with AH-64 Apache attack helicopters teamed with Shadow and MQ-1C Gray Eagle UAVs. Using unmanned assets to scout ahead would put the pilots of manned aircraft out of reach of potential harm. Reformed combat aviation brigades (CAB) would consist of a battalion of 24 Apaches for attack missions and an armed reconnaissance squadron of another 24 Apaches teamed with three Shadow platoons totaling 12 RQ-7s overall; it would also include a Gray Eagle company. The manned-unmanned teaming of Apaches and Unmanned Aircraft (UA) can meet 80 percent of aerial scout requirements.

On 16 March 2015, the 1st Battalion, 501st Aviation Regiment was reflagged the 3rd Squadron, 6th Cavalry Regiment, making it the first of 10 Apache battalions to be converted to a heavy attack reconnaissance squadron by eliminating the Kiowa scout helicopter and having three RQ-7 Shadow platoons organically assigned; the attack battalions will also be aligned with an MQ-1C Gray Eagle company assigned to each division. Moving Shadows from brigade combat team level to the battalions themselves reduces lines of communication, distance issues, and allows operators and pilots to better train and work together.

In early July 2014, the U.S. Army sent RQ-7 Shadows to Baghdad as part of efforts to protect embassy personnel against Islamic State militant attacks, along with Apache attack helicopters which could use them through manned and unmanned teaming to share information and designate targets.

On 29 July 2018, the U.S. Marine conducted its final launch of the RQ-7B during RIMPAC exercises before retiring it. Since first deploying with Marines to Iraq in October 2007, the aircraft eventually equipped four tactical UAS squadrons, flying some 39,000 hours during 11 operational deployments. The Shadow was replaced by the RQ-21 Blackjack, which was first deployed in 2014.

In March 2019, the U.S. Army selected Martin UAV and AAI Corporation to "provide unmanned aircraft systems for platoons to try out as candidates to replace the Shadow tactical UAS." The Army seeks better acoustics and runway independence as compared to the old Shadow, as well as lower equipment requirements. Shortly after the selection of the first teams, L3Harris Technologies and Arcturus-UAV (later under AeroVironment) were also picked to submit candidates. The four aircraft were used to evaluate requirements and assess new capabilities, and in August 2021 the Army decided to proceed with a competition for the Future Tactical Unmanned Aircraft System (FTUAS); a fielding decision was planned for 2025. The Army chose the AeroVironment Jump 20 in August 2022. The procurement will inform requirements for a second program increment, which will rely on a separate competitive acquisition. Although the Army already planned to replace the Shadow in brigade combat teams, it was initially planned to continue to be used by combat aviation brigades and special forces units into the mid-2030s, but the Army revealed in February 2024 that it had decided to replace the entire Shadow fleet as part of an overhaul of its aviation assets. The U.S. Army decided not to continue pursuing the FTUAS in May 2025 after determining the aircraft being developed didn't meet their needs.

=== Service with Romania ===
The first Shadow 600 UAVs entered service with the Romanian Air Force in 1998, and by 2007, nine drones were in service. The drones were used during the Romanian deployment to Iraq starting from 2003. These drones flew on IMINT missions as part of the General Directorate for Defense Intelligence in support of Multinational Division Central-South. Three drones crashed during this deployment.

== Variants ==
=== RQ-7A Shadow ===
The RQ-7A was the initial version of the Shadow 200 UAS developed by AAI. The first low-rate initial-production systems were delivered to the US Army in 2002 with the first full-scale production systems being delivered in September 2003. The RQ-7A was 11 ft 2 in (3.40 m) long and had a wingspan of 12 ft 9 in (3.89 m) with a 327 lb (148 kg) max takeoff weight. The aircraft's endurance ranged between 4 and 5.5 hours depending on mission. The "A" model aircraft also had the AR741-1100 engine which could use either 87 octane automotive gasoline or 100LL aviation fuel. The "A" model also featured IAI's POP200 payload.

=== RQ-7B Shadow ===
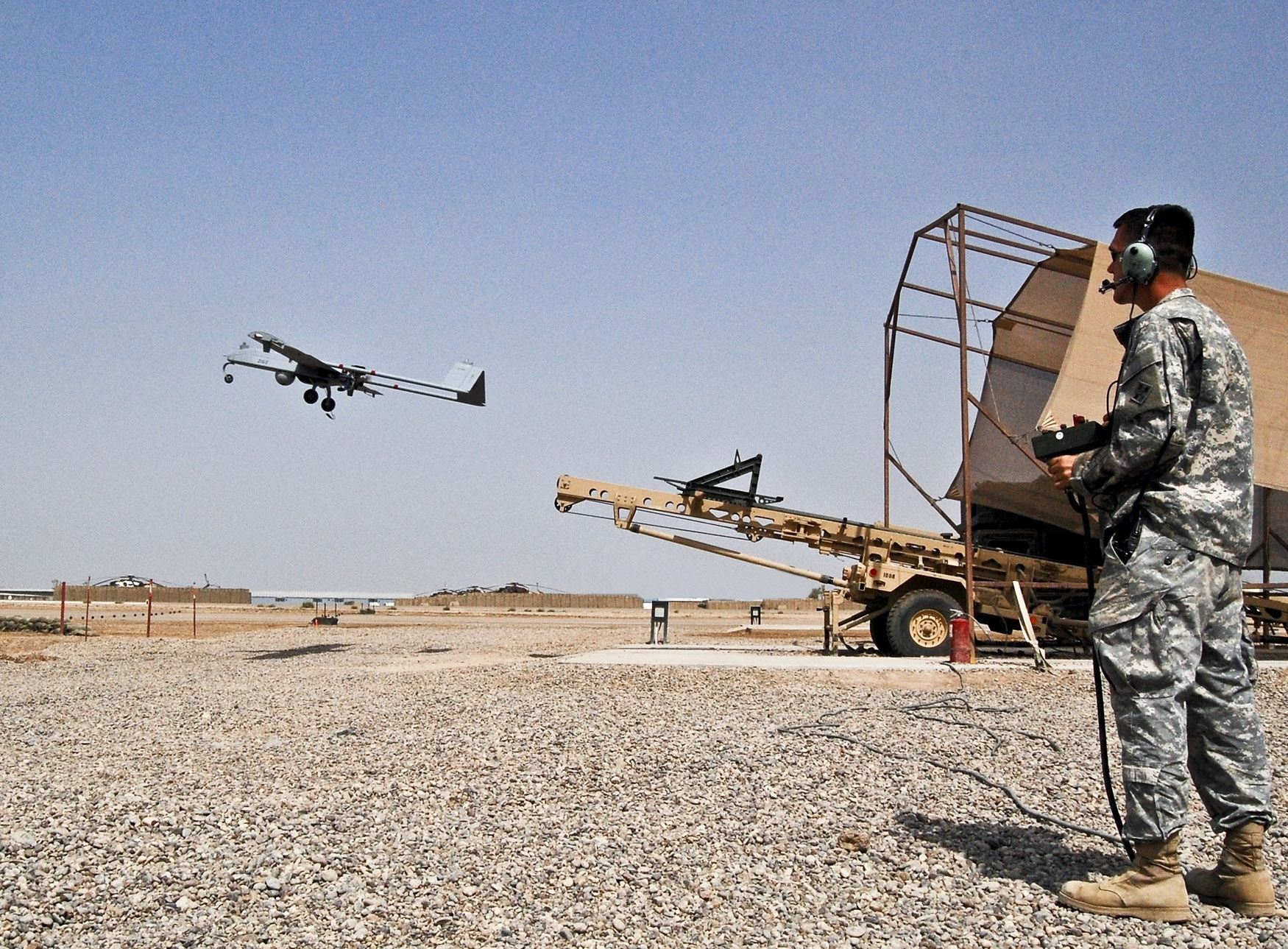
The RQ-7B leaves its launcher.

Production of Shadow aircraft shifted to a generally improved RQ-7B variant in the summer of 2004. The RQ-7B features new wings increased in length to 14 ft (4.3 m). The new wings are not only more aerodynamically efficient, they are "wet" to increase fuel storage up to 44 liters for an endurance of up to 6 hours. The payload capability has been increased to 45 kilograms (99 pounds).

After reports from Iraq that engines were failing, in 2005, the Army's UAV project manager called for the use of 100LL, an aviation fuel, rather than the conventional 87 octane mogas. Avionics systems have been generally improved, and the new wing is designed to accommodate a communications relay package, which allows the aircraft to act as a relay station. This allows commanders or even the aircraft operators themselves to communicate via radio to the troops on ground in locations that would otherwise be "dead" to radio traffic.

The Shadow can operate up to 125 km (78 mi) from its brigade tactical operations center, and recognize tactical vehicles up to 8,000 ft (2,400 m) above the ground at more than 3.5 km (2.2 mi) slant range.

Other incremental improvements to the system include replacing the AR741-1100 engine with the AR741-1101 which increases reliability through the use of dual spark plugs as well as limiting the fuel to 100LL. Also, the older POP200 payload was replaced with the newer POP300 system. In February 2010, AAI began a fleet update program to improve the Shadow system. The improvements include installing the wiring harnesses and software updates for IAI's POP300D payload which includes a designator for guiding laser-guided bombs.

Other improvements in the program will include an electronic fuel injection engine and fuel system to replace the AR741-1101's carburetted engine. The most visible improvement to the system will be a wider wing of 20 feet (6.1 m) in span which is designed to increase fuel capacity and allow for mission endurance of almost 9 hours. The new wings will also include hardpoints for external munitions.

A joint Army-Marine program is testing IED jamming on a Shadow at MCAS Yuma. Another joint effort is to view a 4 km × 4 km (2.5 mi × 2.5 mi) ground area from 3,650 m (12,000 feet).

The Army is now proposing the upgraded Shadow 152A, which includes Soldier Radio Waveform software, which allows both the command post and their troops to see the images that the UAV is projecting, as long as they are on the same frequency. It also increases the distance and area of communication.

Preliminary TCDL testing conducted at Dugway Proving Ground was a success. This led to an estimated fielding date of May 2010 for TCDL. In March 2015, the first Shadow unit was equipped with the upgraded RQ-7BV2 Shadow version. New capabilities for the BV2 include the TCDL, encryption of video and control data-links, software that allows interoperability between other UAS platforms, integration of a common control station and control terminal for all Army UAS platforms, an electronic fuel-injection engine, and increased endurance to nine hours through a lengthened wingspan of 20 ft (6.1 m), with weight increased to 204 kg (450 lb). Shadow systems are being upgraded at a rate of 2-3 per month, with all Army Shadows planned to become BV2s by 2019.

In 2020, the Army introduced the Shadow Block III. The configuration allows the Shadow to fly in rainy conditions of up to 5 cm (2 inches) per hour, a four-fold increase over previous versions, carries the L3 Wescam MX-10 EO/IR camera with enhanced image collection, has a Joint Tactical Radio System to enable communications relay, and uses a more reliable and powerful engine configuration with reduced noise.

==== Armed Shadow ====
On 19 April 2010 the Army issued a "solicitation for sources sought" from defense contractors for a munition for the Shadow system with a deadline for proposals due no later than 10 May 2010. Although no specific munition has been chosen yet, some possible munitions include the Raytheon Pyros bomb, the General Dynamics 81 mm 4.5 kg (10-pound) air-dropped guided mortar, as well as the QuickMEDS system for delivering medical supplies to remote and stranded troops.

The Army subsequently slowed work, and the Marine Corps then took the lead on arming the RQ-7 Shadow. Raytheon has conducted successful flight tests with the Small Tactical Munition, and Lockheed Martin has tested the Shadow Hawk glide weapon from an RQ-7. On 1 November 2012, General Dynamics successfully demonstrated their guided 81 mm Air Dropped Mortar, with three launches at 7,000 ft (2,100 m) hitting within seven meters of the target grid.

As of August 2011, the Marine Corps has received official clearance to experiment with armed RQ-7s, and requires AAI to select a precision munition ready for deployment. AAI was awarded $10 million for this in December 2011, and claims a weapon has already been fielded by the Shadow. In 2014, Textron launched the Fury precision weapon from a Shadow 200.

By May 2015, the Marine Corps had run out of funding for weaponizing the RQ-7, and the Army had shown little interest in continuing the effort. The Army's stance is that the Shadow's primary capability is persistent surveillance, while there are many other ways to drop bombs on targets and adding that to the Shadow would add weight and decrease endurance.

=== Nightwarden ===
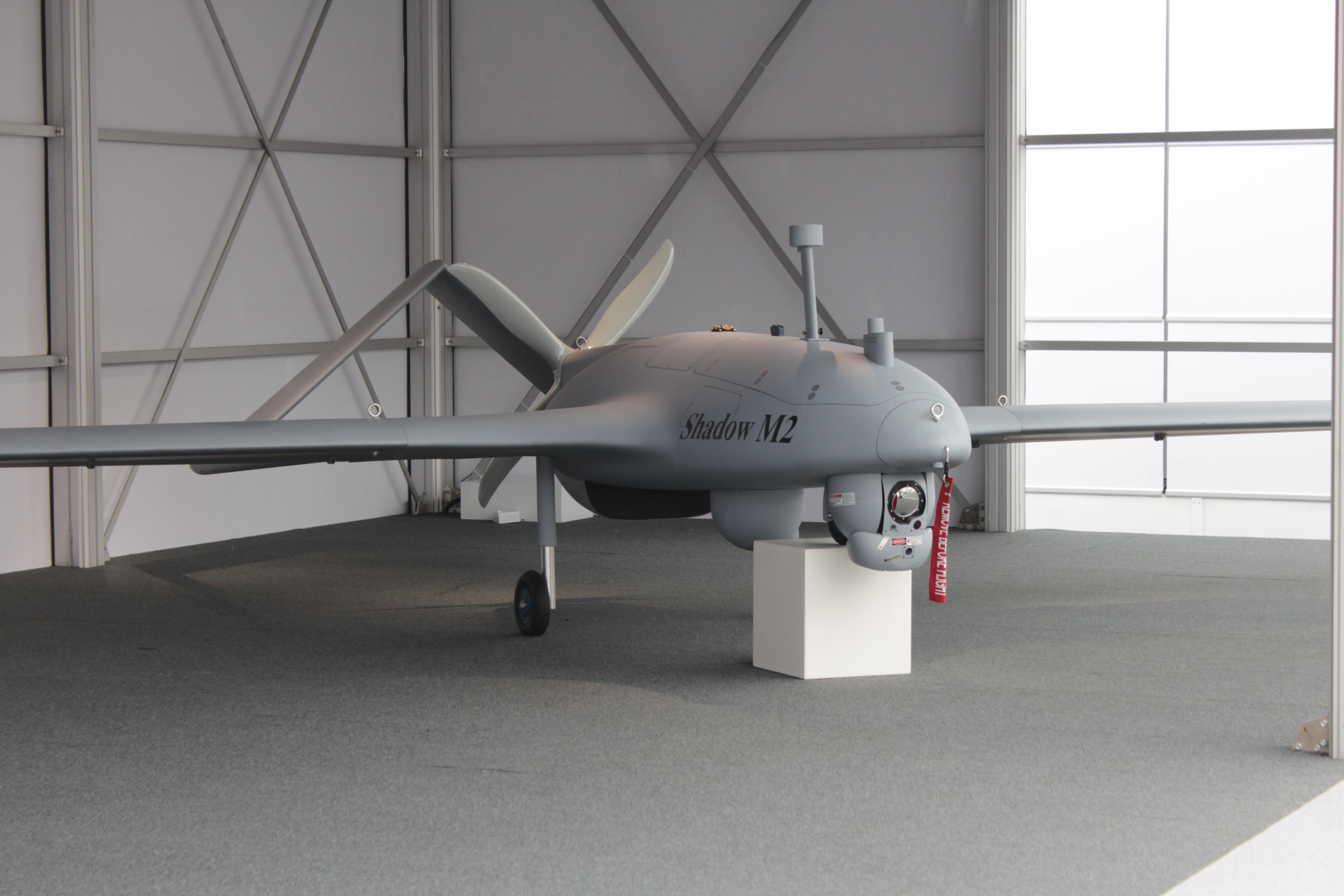
Shadow M2

A test version called STTB flew in summer 2011. AAI is developing a bigger version called M2 with a blended wing to include a 3-cylinder 60 hp (45 kW) Lycoming heavy fuel engine, and began flight testing in August 2012. The Shadow M2 has a conformal blended body that reduces drag, wingspan increased to 25 ft (7.6 m), and is 120 lb (54 kg) heavier. It can fly for 16 hours at altitudes up to 18,000–20,000 ft (5,500–6,100 m). Its endurance and service ceiling are comparable to Group 4 UASs like the MQ-1 Predator, so the company is pitching the M2 as a budget-conscious alternative to larger unmanned aircraft.

It has a greater payload to carry synthetic aperture radar (SAR), wide-area surveillance, navigation, signals intelligence, and electronic warfare packages. It also has the ability to be controlled beyond line-of-sight through a SATCOM link. Although the M2 uses the same internal components as the RQ-7B Shadow 200 and is compatible with existing support equipment and ground infrastructure, its greater weight necessitates changes to the existing launcher. The Shadow M2 uses 80-85 percent of the components of the Shadow V2, while allowing for an additional 100 lb (45 kg) of capability with total airframe weight increased to 720 lb (330 kg).

In June 2017, Textron introduced the Nightwarden TUAS as a production-ready model of the developmental Shadow M2, the change in name due to significant improvements and enhancements to the system such as greater flexibility and combat capability, SATCOM features, and enhanced command-and-control. The aircraft has a range of 1,100 km (680 mi), maximum speed of 90 knots (100 mph; 170 km/h), endurance of 15 hours, can fly at an altitude of 16,000 ft (4,900 m), and has a maximum takeoff weight of 750 lb (340 kg) with a dual-payload bay with a capacity of 130 lb (59 kg).

=== Shadow 600 ===
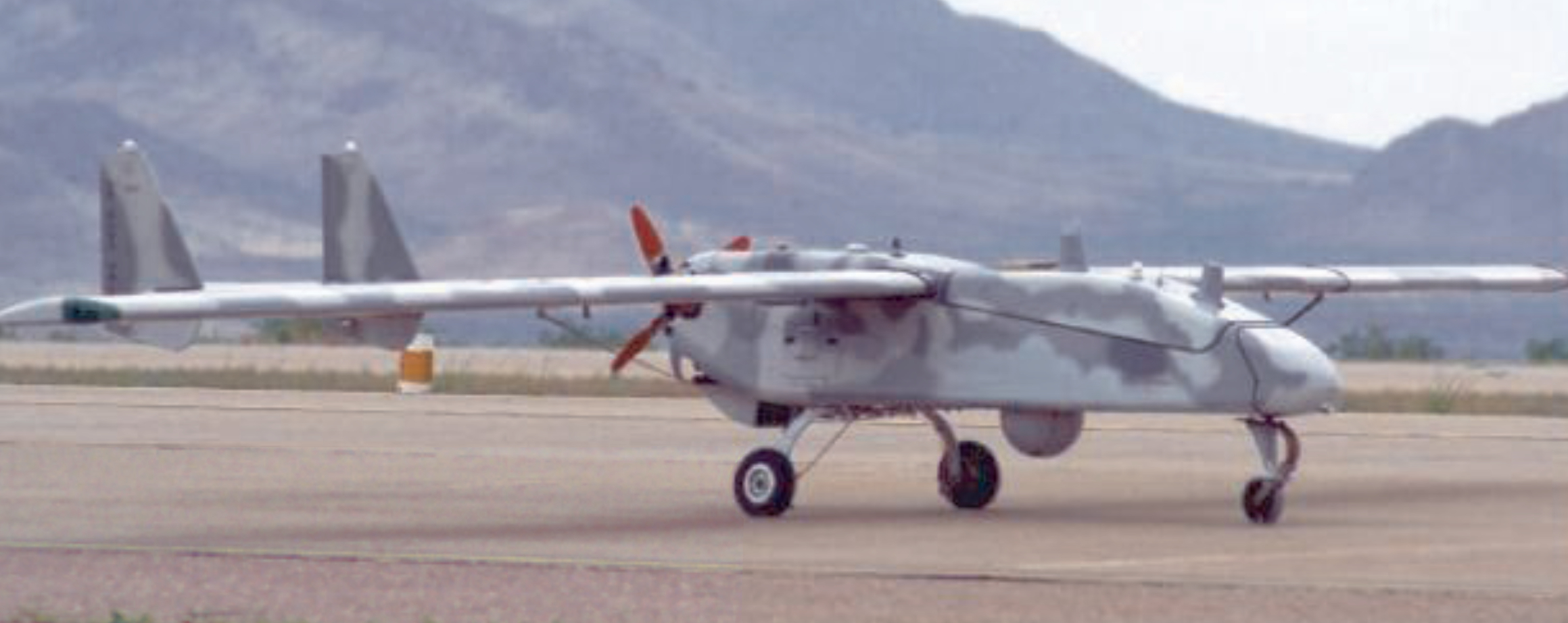
A Shadow 600 UAV

AAI has also built a scaled-up Pioneer derivative known as the "Shadow 600". It also resembles a Pioneer, except that the outer panels of the wings are distinctively swept back, and it has a stronger Wankel engine, the UAV EL 801, with 52 hp (39 kW). A number of Shadow 600s are in service in several nations, including Romania.

=== SR/C Shadow ===
AAI, in conjunction with Textron sister company Bell Helicopter, intends to modify two Shadows with a Carter rotor on top for vertical take-off and landing, eliminating the need for the recovery and pneumatic launcher systems, while increasing payload and endurance. As of August 2011, it is expected to fly in 2012. AAI also expected to use the SR/C technology for the Shadow Knight, a powered-rotor two-propeller surveillance aircraft for the US Navy MRMUAS program; however, the MRMUAS program was cancelled in 2012.

== Operators ==
=== Current operators ===
Italy

- Italian Army: In July 2010, the Italian army ordered four Shadow 200 systems.

Sweden

- Swedish Army: 8 aircraft (2 systems) were delivered early in 2011. These systems were then modified by SAAB to be more suited for Swedish use, named UAV03 Örnen. Set to be replaced.

Turkey

- Turkish Air Force: Turkish Air Force; The Turkish Air Force also operates 9 RQ-7 Shadow 600s.

United States

- United States Army: Estimated 500 RQ-7Bs as of January 2025

=== Former operators ===
Australia

- Australian Army: The Australian Government bought 18 aircraft replacing the ScanEagle, and began using them in Afghanistan in May 2012. The Army retired the Shadow in 2024.

United States

- United States Marine Corps

Romania

- Romanian Air Force: The Romanian Air Force has purchased 11 Shadow 600s, The first six drones were acquired in 1998. One crashed in the country and three in Iraq.

== Incidents and accidents ==
On 15 August 2011, a U.S. Air Force C-130 cargo plane collided with a RQ-7 while on approach to Forward Operating Base Sharana in Paktika Province, Afghanistan. The C-130 made an emergency landing with damage to two engines and one wing, while the RQ-7 was destroyed completely. The collision caused the cargo aircraft to be grounded for several months while being fixed, while the RQ-7 wreckage was never recovered.

On 3 April 2014, a Pennsylvanian Army National Guard RQ-7 participating in training exercises at Fort Indiantown Gap crashed near an elementary school in Pennsylvania and was then hit by a civilian vehicle destroying the drone. No injuries were reported.

On 10 July 2019, a U.S. Army RQ-7 operated by the 25th Infantry Division crashed in the Waianae mountains near the Schofield Barracks in Hawaii.

On 17 July 2019, a Wisconsin National Guard RQ-7 lost its link to its operator at Volk Field during a training exercise. The drone went down into trees south of Interstate 90/94 between Oakdale and Camp Douglas. No injuries or damage were reported. The drone suffered "significant" damage.

== Specifications (200 Family) ==
General characteristics

- Capacity: 45 kg (99 pounds) (RQ-7B)
- Length: 11 ft 2 in (3.41 m)
- Wingspan: 14 ft 0 in (3.87 m)
- Height: 3 ft 4 in (1.0 m)
- Airfoil: NACA 4415
- Empty weight: 186 lb (77 kg)
- Gross weight: 375 lb (170 kg)
- Powerplant: 1 × Wankel UAV Engine 741 used only with Silkolene Synthetic Oil , 38 hp (28.5 kW)

Performance

- Maximum speed: 130 mph (200 km/h, 110 kn)
- Cruise speed: 81 mph (130 km/h, 70 kn)
- Range: 68 mi (109.5 km, 59 nmi)
- Endurance: 6 h/ 9 h Increased Endurance (up to 4 hours at a range out to 50 km from the launch and recovery site)
- Service ceiling: 15,000 ft (4,600 m) ELOS (Electronic Line Of Sight)

Note: When outfitted with IE (Increased Endurance) Wings, the CRP (Communications Relay Package) and the 1102 engine, endurance time is increased to 9 hours, wing span is increased to approx. 22 feet (6.7 m), and the service ceiling is 5,500 m (18,000 ft) (only with authorization).

== See also ==
- Dragon Eye
- Unmanned combat aerial vehicle

Related development

- AAI RQ-2 Pioneer

Related lists

- List of active United States military aircraft
