= Iqbalpur railway station =

Railway station in Uttar Pradesh

Iqbalpur

General information
- Location: National Highway 344, Amarpur Qazi, Haridwar district, Uttarakhand; India
- Coordinates: 29°52′30″N 77°48′14″E
- Elevation: 270 m (890 ft)
- System: Passenger train station
- Owner: Indian Railways
- Operator: Northern Railway
- Line: Moradabad–Ambala line
- Platforms: 2
- Tracks: 2

Construction
- Structure type: Standard (on ground station)

Other information
- Status: Active
- Station code: IQB
- Zone(s): Northern Railway zone
- Division(s): Moradabad

History
- Opened: 1886
- Former names: Oudh and Rohilkhand Railway

Services
Preceding station	Indian Railways	Following station
Roorkee towards ?	Northern Railway zone Moradabad–Ambala line	Chodiala towards ?
Location

Iqbalpur railway station is a railway station on Moradabad–Ambala line under the Moradabad railway division of Northern Railway zone. This is situated beside National Highway 344 at Amarpur Qazi in Haridwar district of the Indian state of Uttarakhand.
