= The Trinity Tripod =

Student newspaper of Trinity College in Hartford, Connecticut

- The cover of the first issue of The Trinity Tripod
- Type: Weekly student newspaper
- Format: Tabloid
- Owner: Trinity College
- Editor-in-chief: Bella Chirkis '27 and Talia Cutler '27
- Managing editor: Kashmala Khan '29
- Founded: 1904; 122 years ago
- Headquarters: Jackson Dormitory; Trinity College; Hartford, Connecticut; United States
- City: Hartford, CT
- Website: www.trinitytripod.com

The Trinity Tripod is the only student newspaper and student publication of Trinity College in Hartford, Connecticut. Since 2006, the Tripod has been arranged with five sections, in order, News, Opinions, Features, Arts and Sports. The Tripod also publishes editorials and letters to the editor on Page Two. A typical issue of the Tripod has 12 pages and is published weekly on Tuesdays when classes are in session.

== History ==
The Trinity Tripod was first published by the students of Trinity College in Hartford, Connecticut in 1904, when it was primarily focused on publishing Trinity news and sports information for the alumni community. The first issue of the Tripod was published on September 23, 1904, The inaugural Editor-in-Chief was Malcolm C. Farrow '05.

The Tripod is comparatively new among student publications in the NESCAC League, with only The (Connecticut) College Voice (1916) and The Middlebury Campus (1905) founded at later dates. Two student publications at Trinity preceded the Tripod: The Trinity Tablet, an early student review and literary magazine, was formed in 1868 and ran until 1908.

The Tripod's offices were first on the college's historic Long Walk. The offices later moved to the basement of Mather Hall and their current location in the basement of the Jackson dormitory.

The original price of the Tripod was five cents, with a yearly subscription costing $2.00. The paper was published twice weekly until 1917, when it assumed the now-familiar once-a-week format. At various points, including during the late 1960s, the Tripod reverted to twice weekly publication.

The Tripod's motto, "Now Then-Trinity," was coined by President of the College Flavel Sweeten Luther in his 1904 inauguration speech and remains in use today. Early use of the paper covered a variety of contentious topics, including the founding of a Trinity socialist society, compulsory attendance at Episcopal Chapel services (which continued at the college until the mid-1960s), and student engagement.

The Tripod also saw contention in the 1920s with declining student engagement. In 1927, then-Editor-in-Chief Malcom L. Stephenson '27 was suspended by the college administration after publishing an editorial critical of Dean Edward Troxwell. The ensuing controversy over freedom of speech was covered in national publications, including The Hartford Courant, The New York Times, and The Associated Press. The controversy also drew attention from The Harvard Crimson, which wrote in support of the Tripod and its beleaguered editor in an editorial.

Following the publication of Trinity's alumni magazine, the Reporter by the college in 1939, the Tripod shifted its focus to cover student affairs and conflict in greater detail. In 1941, The Tripod published its first satirical issue—The Trinity Liepod—a tradition which had been maintained for much of the twentieth century and continues yearly as of 2025. The publication struggled as a result of student enlistment under editor Stanley Kligfeld and ceased publication 1943-1944 as a result of World War II. It was briefly revived as a magazine in December 1944 under editor Harry Brand, but did not fully resume operations until 1946 under editor Tom Gorman.

The Tripod celebrated 60 years of publication in 1964 and saw an editorial board increasingly critical of existing College institutions as the 1960s progressed. George Will '62, a Pulitzer-prize winning columnist at The Washington Post, and Peter Kilborn '61, a features editor at The New York Times, led the Tripod's charge against fraternities. Editorials of the 1960s resulted in the burning of copies of the Tripod by some irate students and also addressed Trinity's institutions and secret societies such as The Medusa Society.

The Tripod also covered the 1968 sit-in protests for diversity with the Board of Trustees, the 1969 decision by the Board to make the college coeducational, and the opening of the Trinity-in-Rome program. According to College Archivist Peter Knapp, faculty debate on the issue of the protests spilled into the pages of the Tripod, demonstrating the paper's increasing relevance as the forum of record on campus.

Tripod editorials in the 1970s were critical of then-President Richard Nixon and the Vietnam War. The Tripod also covered local Connecticut news during this time in a special section and coverage was marked by ongoing concern over student involvement in administrative decisions. The 1980s also saw the brief return of competing student publications such as The Trinity Observer and the Questioner. Tripod editorials of the 1980s continued in their coverage of fraternity affairs and student concerns with fraternity actions and the implications of coeducation.

The 1990s saw continued frustration around the same issues. An editorial described the issue thusly: "Trinity students and administrators are creatures of habit.... [E]very semester, the same issues arise. Drinking, Greek life, diversity, apathy, safety, dorm damage. These are not new topics, but each year there is a new twist on the old themes."

The Tripod website was launched 2000 with the rise of the internet and saw other online venues, including The Daily Jolt, TrinTalk.com, and Facebook serve as outlets for student discourse. In 2004, the Tripod celebrated its centennial year of publication.

The Tripod covered two significant controversies in the late 2000s and early 2010s, including the college administration's misappropriation of funds in 2009 from an account held under the Shelby Cullom Davis Foundation to support operations, first reported by The Wall Street Journal, and the 2012 "co-education fraternity mandate" that failed and resulted in the early retirement of then-Trinity President James F. Jones in 2013.

Coverage during the mid-2010s included ongoing Title VII litigation against Trinity and the college's continued response to diversity and equity and inclusion concerns.

During the 2020 COVID-19 pandemic, the Tripod documented the college's ongoing response to the pandemic, which infected more than one hundred students, and investigated its quarantine practices and relationship with Hartford Healthcare.

== Today ==
The Tripod is published every Tuesday during the academic year, usually resulting in 8-10 issues per semester. The current Editors-in-Chief of the Tripod are Bella Chirkis ’27 and Talia Cutler ’27.

The Tripod maintains an online presence on its website, where its weekly print content is available in full together with additional online materials. The Tripod also prints an annual satire issue, The Liepod, on April Fool's Day, and maintains active social media accounts on Instagram, Twitter, and Facebook.

The Tripod presently consists of five sections: News, Opinion, Features, Arts, and Sports and is generally twelve pages long. The Tripod also runs editorial content and letters to the editor on Page Two. In November 2020, the Tripod published a special commemorative issue documenting the thoughts of Trinity students during the 2020 United States presidential election.

== Alumni ==
Famous alumni in journalism include syndicated Washington Post columnist George F. Will '62, Los Angeles Times sportswriter Jim Murray '43, and Washington Post columnist Steven Pearlstein '73 – all three are Pulitzer Prize winners. New York Times features writer Peter Kilborn '61 was also an editor of the Tripod in the early 1960s.

Outside of journalism, Tripod editors have had notable careers in other fields: Chief Justice of the Michigan Supreme Court Bridget Mary McCormack '88 was an editor.
