= Outrider =

Outrider or Outriders may refer to:

- Outrider (album) by Jimmy Page
- Outrider (Star Wars), Dash Rendar's YT-2400 freighter in the Shadows of the Empire multimedia campaign
- Motorcycle outrider, in a law enforcement escort
- RQ-6 Outrider, unmanned aerial vehicle
- Outriders (TV series), an Australian TV series
- The Outriders, a 1950 American Western film
- Outriders (video game), a 2021 video game
- Outriders, an alien race created by Marvel Comics
