= CDI =

CDI, CDi, CD-i, or .cdi may refer to:

== Businesses and organizations ==
=== Government and political organizations ===
- Center for Defense Information, a Washington, D.C. think tank founded in 1972
- Center for Digital Inclusion, originally "Comitê para Democratização da Informática", a non-governmental organization in Brazil
- Centrist Democrat International, formerly the Christian Democrat International, a political international formed in 1961
- China Development Institute, a Shenzhen, China think tank founded in 1989
- Comisión Nacional para el Desarrollo de los Pueblos Indígenas, Mexico's National Commission for the Development of Indigenous Peoples
- California Department of Insurance, The State of California insurance regulation department

=== Schools and colleges ===
- CDI College, a for-profit college in Canada
- Collège des Ingénieurs, educational institution in France, Germany and Italy
- Control Data Institute, an international technical vocational school created by the American Control Data Corporation

=== Other businesses ===
- Camperdown Dairy International, an Australian infant formula company
- CDI Corporation, an engineering services and employment agency in Philadelphia, PA
- Cellular Dynamics International, an American research support company
- Churchill Downs Incorporated, parent company of Churchill Downs
- Controlled Demolition, Inc., a Phoenix, Maryland demolition firm

== Economics ==
- Category Development Index, measures the sales strength of a particular category of product, within a specific market
- Contrat à durée indéterminée, French for open-ended contract, the usual form of employment contract in France
- Child Development Index, a measure of global child poverty
- CREST Depositary Interest, in investing, a form of depositary receipt in the UK

== Science and technology ==
=== In chemistry, biology and medicine ===
- Carbonyldiimidazole, an activating agent used for example for peptide coupling
- Central diabetes insipidus, an endocrine disorder
- Clinical documentation improvement, a process of improving healthcare records
- Clostridioides difficile infection, an intestinal disease also known as Clostridium difficile infection
- Combined drug intoxication, also known as Multiple Drug Intake (MDI)
- Contact-dependent growth inhibition, a type of toxin delivery between bacteria which requires direct contact
- Cyclin-dependent kinase inhibitor protein, a protein which inhibits cyclin-dependent kinase

=== Computing ===
- Contexts and Dependency Injection, a Java standard for the inversion of control design pattern
- CD-i, a CD-derived multimedia format, including its players made by Philips

=== Imaging techniques ===
- Coherent diffraction imaging, a lensless nanoscale imaging technique
- Current density imaging, an extension of magnetic resonance imaging (MRI)
- Color doppler imaging, a type of Doppler ultrasonography

=== In transportation ===
- Capacitor discharge ignition or thyristor ignition, a type of electronic ignition system
- Common rail diesel injection, a modern method of fuel injection in diesel engines
- Course deviation indicator, an aircraft navigation instrument

=== Other uses in science and technology ===
- Capacitive deionization, a water desalination technology based on the use of electrical field effects
- Common direct injection, a synonym of common rail; a type of fuel injection
- Customer data integration, a discipline concerned with representation of data in enterprise systems
- Cyrel Digital Imager, a direct laser-engraving flexography plate printing device
- .cdi filename extension, for DiscJuggler disk images, developed by Padus
- „$C_{D,i}$”, the lift-induced drag coefficient

== Other uses ==
- Côte d'Ivoire, a country in West Africa once known as Ivory Coast
- Chief of Defence Intelligence, head of the UK Defence Intelligence Staff
- Ciudad de las Ideas (conference), a conference at Puebla, Mexico
- Custodial Detention Index, a list of U.S. residents compiled by FBI during 1939–1941, later used for Japanese-American internment
- Chak De! India, a 2007 Bollywood sports film about field hockey in India
- 401 in Roman numerals
- Certified Deaf Interpreter, a certificate offered by the Registry of Interpreters for the Deaf
