= Continuing legal education =

Professional education for attorneys

Continuing legal education (CLE), also known as mandatory or minimum continuing legal education (MCLE) or, in some jurisdictions outside the United States, as continuing professional development, consists of professional education for attorneys that takes place after their initial admission to the bar. Within the United States, attorneys in many states and territories must complete certain required CLE in order to maintain their U.S. licenses to practice law. Outside the United States, lawyers in various jurisdictions, such as British Columbia in Canada, must also complete certain required CLE. However, some jurisdictions, such as the District of Columbia, India, and Israel, recommend, but do not require, that attorneys complete CLE.

== Australia ==
- In New South Wales continuing legal education is regulated by the Law Society of New South Wales.

== United States ==
No nationwide rules exist within the United States for CLE requirements or accreditation. Instead, each individual jurisdiction (i.e., each state, the District of Columbia, and each territory) exercises discretion on how to regulate U.S. attorneys, which includes establishing rules for CLE requirements and accreditation. This authority is typically vested in each jurisdiction's supreme court and delegated to special CLE commissions or boards.

Nonetheless, various efforts have been made to promote uniformity of CLE programs across U.S. jurisdictions. For example, the American Bar Association (ABA) promulgated a model CLE rule for individual jurisdictions to adopt. Similarly, the Continuing Legal Education Regulators Association (CLEreg) created a uniform CLE application, a uniform CLE attendance certification, and a CLE distance learning glossary. CLEreg also created a CLE guide to assist its members in managing CLE programs.

In U.S. jurisdictions with mandatory CLE requirements, attorneys must typically earn a minimum number of CLE credits (measured in hours) over a set period of years. Also, some of these jurisdictions require a minimum number of CLE credits for specific topics (e.g., ethics, diversity training, elimination of bias, professional responsibility, basic skills, substance abuse, prevention of malpractice, and attorney-client disputes).

U.S. attorneys typically earn CLE credits by completing legal training presented by experienced attorneys. The training may cover both legal theory and practical experiences in legal practice. Competency testing is not usually required in order for attorneys to earn CLE credits through legal training. Classroom training materials can be extensive and may represent the most current and advanced thinking available on a particular legal subject. Oftentimes, a portion of CLE credits may be earned through reading and other self-study. In recent years, many jurisdictions now allow attorneys to earn CLE credits as part of distance education courses taken on-line or by listening to audio downloads.

Alternatively, experienced attorneys in some jurisdictions, such as New York, may also earn CLE credits for speaking or teaching at accredited CLE programs; for moderating or participating in panel presentations at accredited CLE activities; for teaching law courses at ABA-accredited law schools; for preparing students for and judging law competitions, mock trials and moot court arguments, including those at the high school or college level; for published legal research-based writing; and for providing pro bono legal services.

Legal training or other activities often meet the rules for CLE requirements and accreditation in multiple jurisdictions. In these instances, nothing prohibits attorneys licensed in one or more of these jurisdictions from counting the training or other activities towards fulfillment of their CLE credit requirements for each of these jurisdictions.

Opportunities for CLE are offered throughout the year by state bar associations, national legal organizations such as the American Bar Association, Federal Bar Association, law schools, and many other legal associations and groups such as non-profit CLE providers Practising Law Institute (PLI), American Law Institute Continuing Legal Education (ALI CLE; formerly American Law Institute-American Bar Association ALI-ABA), The Center for American and International Law (CAIL), and The Institute of American & Talmudic Law (IAT Law), as well as other private enterprises like SproutEd and CeriFi LegalEdge. Activities are usually open to all lawyers (and sometimes non-lawyers), but organizations often offer discounts to their own members. A recent trend is toward the provision and promotion of free CLE programs.

Uniquely, Kentucky allows all licensed attorneys in the state to complete their annual CLE requirement without a registration fee through a two-day program known as Kentucky Law Update, offered annually in at least seven locations throughout the state.

Some attorneys, particularly those who have spent many years in active practice, have resisted CLE requirements as unconstitutional. However, in 1999, the Supreme Court of California upheld that state's CLE program against an Equal Protection Clause constitutional challenge.

== Canada ==
In Canada, rules vary by jurisdiction (i.e., provinces and territories). For example, Alberta has a mandatory Continuing Professional Development (CPD) program, requiring preparation of annual CPD plans. Lawyers develop their plans and declare to the Law Society of Alberta on an annual basis that these are complete. The Legal Education Society of Alberta provides tools to facilitate compliance with these requirements.

In Ontario the Law Society of Upper Canada, beginning in 2010, instituted mandatory CPD hours for all lawyers in the province.

In British Columbia, CPD is mandatory and lawyers are required to annually report their continuing legal education activities to the Law Society of British Columbia. The Continuing Legal Education Society of BC provides tools to facilitate compliance with these requirements. Practicing lawyers must complete a minimum of 12 hours of coursework and 50 hours of self study annually.

The Canadian Defence Lawyers association provides defence-oriented CLE.

== The Philippines ==
Continuing legal education required of members of the Integrated Bar of the Philippines (IBP) to ensure that throughout their career, they keep abreast with law and jurisprudence, maintain the ethics of the profession and enhance the standards of the practice of law (Rule 1, Bar Matter No. 850 – Supreme Court of the Philippines)

== See also ==
- Bar Professional Training Course
- Continuing Legal Education Regulators Association (CLEreg)
- National Judges College (China)
- National Judicial Academy (India)
