= Practising Law Institute =

Continuing legal education organization

- Formation: 1933
- Type: Non-Profit CLE Provider
- Headquarters: New York City
- President: Sharon L. Crane
- Website: http://www.pli.edu

Practising Law Institute (PLI) is an American non-profit continuing legal education (CLE) organization chartered by the Regents of the University of the State of New York. Founded in 1933, the company organizes and provides CLE programs around the world. Its programs are held in multiple locations including New York, California, Illinois, Washington, D.C., Georgia, Massachusetts, Texas, Pennsylvania, London, Hong Kong, and Singapore.

Programs are also offered in various formats, including live webcasts, MP3s, and on-demand videos, accessible through the PLI.edu website or PLI's mobile app. PLI's headquarters are located in New York City, New York; it also maintains an office in San Francisco, California.

== History ==
Founded in 1933, PLI was established to offer courses in the practice of law for lawyers recently admitted to the bar or those seeking to learn the elements of practicing in the field. As the country was seeing a transition from apprenticeship to formal law school education, a New York City lawyer by the name of Harold P. Seligson recognized the need for practical training in law and originated a series of lectures called the "Practising Law Courses." These lectures would be the germination of the full-fledged Institute that exists today under the banner of Practising Law Institute (PLI).

By 1939, the Institute had been formally chartered by the Regents of the State of New York. It was able to take advantage of certain historical forces, including the New Deal and the federal regulation of business activity it inspired. The Securities Act of 1933 and the Securities Exchange Act of 1934, for example, initiated a new specialization in the law. This new specialization in turn created a need for a new kind of continuing legal education, which we see in practice today.

As a not-for-profit educational organization, PLI offers pro bono programs in numerous practice areas, as well as pro bono scholarships for individuals and organizations including lawyers, legal services and nonprofit organizations, and students in need of assistance. PLI awards over 2,700 scholarships annually and had 870 Pro Bono Members as of year-end 2024.

In addition to programs covering 33 practice areas, PLI produces podcasts and video series, and publishes legal treatises, periodicals, and other materials through its PLI Press publishing arm.

In 2021, Sharon L. Crane became President of the organization. She is the second woman to serve in this role, after Anita Carr Shapiro, who died in September 2020.

== Notable faculty and authors ==
- Robert Khuzami
- Preet Bharara
- Mary Schapiro
- Burt Neuborne
- Ted Wells
