= ASC Technology Committee =

The American Society of Cinematographers Technology Committee (ASC Technology Committee) is a group of cinematographers and a broad collection of A-list motion picture industry participants working on how to make high quality motion pictures using the new technologies and techniques presented by the massive changes taking place in pre-production, cameras, production, post-production, theatrical delivery and exhibition, and non-theatrical (home) delivery and exhibition. The ASC Technology Committee has been one of the industry leaders in these areas. Significant work produced includes the ASC-DCI Standard Evaluation Material (StEM), the ASC-PGA Camera Assessment Series (CAS), and the ASC Color Decision List (ASC CDL).

The ASC Technology Committee is the first committee in the ASC's nearly 100-year history that has some officers and participants who are not ASC Member cinematographers.

- Chair: Curtis Clark
- Vice-chair: Richard Edlund, ASC
- Vice-chair: Steven Poster, ASC
- Secretary: David Reisner
