= James Thomson (cell biologist) =

American developmental biologist

James Alexander Thomson
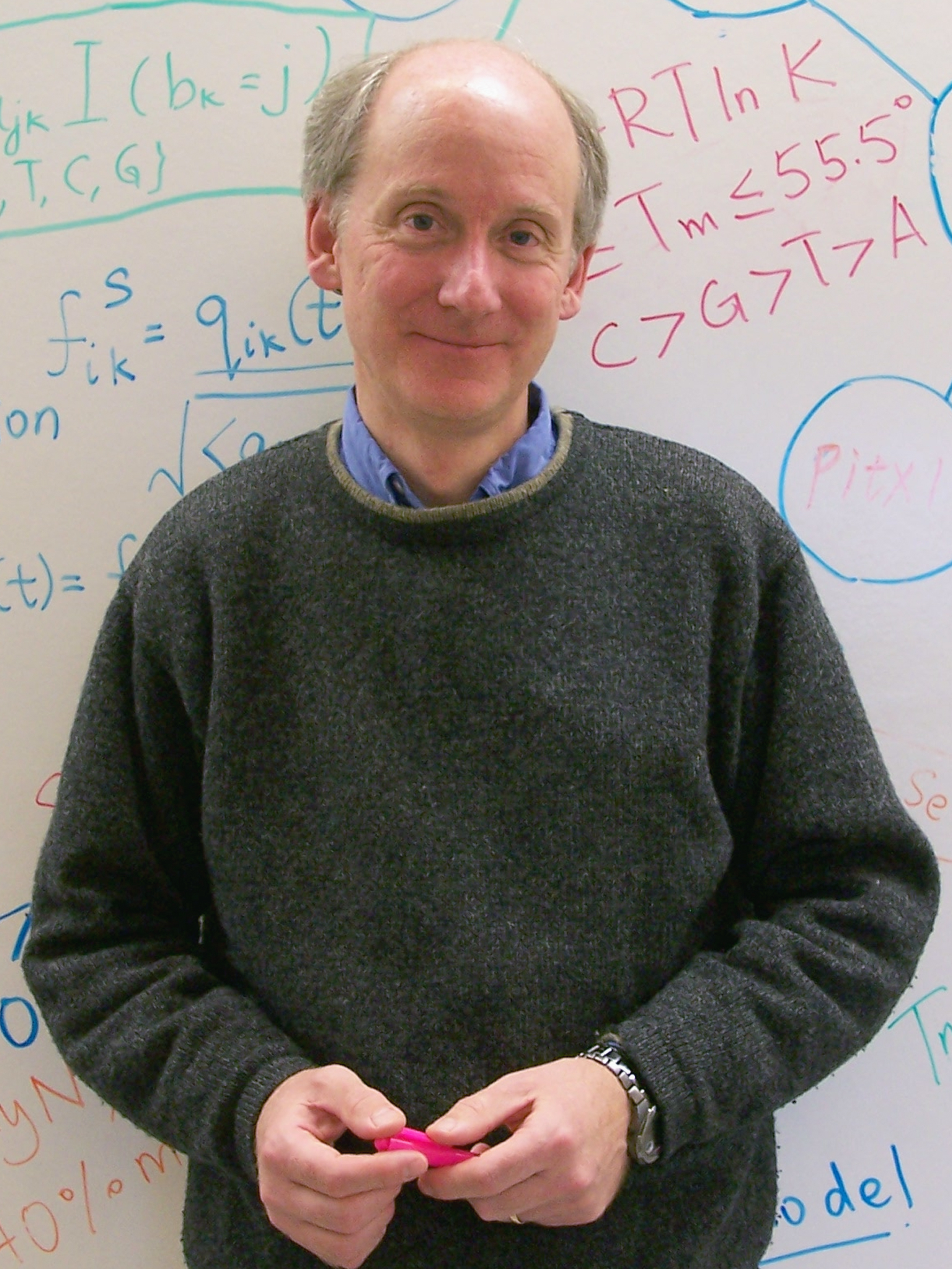
- Thomson in 2008
- Born: Oak Park, Illinois, U.S.
- Citizenship: United States
- Education: University of Illinois at Urbana-Champaign (1981); University of Pennsylvania (1988)
- Known for: Stem cell research
- Scientific career
- Fields: Developmental biology
- Workplaces: Morgridge Institute for Research; University of Wisconsin, Madison; University of California, Santa Barbara

James Alexander Thomson is an American developmental biologist best known for deriving the first human embryonic stem cell line in 1998 and for deriving human induced pluripotent stem cells (iPS) in 2007.

== Research ==
Human embryonic stem cells [which are cells that reproduce over and over and over again until they eventually die. they are what other cells 'stem' from] can divide without limit, and yet maintain the potential to make all the cells of the body. This remarkable potential makes them useful for basic research on the function of the human body, for drug discovery and testing, and as a source of cells and tissues for transplantation medicine. In 1998, Thomson's Lab was the first to report the successful isolation of human embryonic stem cells. On November 6, 1998, Science published this research in an article titled "Embryonic Stem Cell Lines Derived from Human Blastocysts", results which Science later featured in its “Scientific Breakthrough of the Year” article, 1999.

In spite of their great medical potential, however, human embryonic stem cells generated enormous controversy because their derivation involved the destruction of a human embryo. In 2007, Thomson's group (contemporaneously with Dr. Shinya Yamanaka) reported a method for converting human skin cells into cells that very closely resemble human embryonic stem cells. Published in Science in late 2007 in an article titled "Induced Pluripotent Stem Cell Lines Derived from Human Somatic Cells", the results garnered international attention for potentially ending the ethical controversy surrounding human embryonic stem cell research. Science later featured induced pluripotent stem cells in its “Scientific Breakthrough of the Year” article, 2008.

== Education ==
Thomson graduated with a B.S. in biophysics from the University of Illinois in 1981. He entered the Veterinary Medical Scientist Training Program at the University of Pennsylvania, receiving his doctorate in veterinary medicine in 1985, and his doctorate in molecular biology in 1988. His doctoral thesis involved understanding genetic imprinting in early mammalian development under the mentorship of Davor Solter at the Wistar Institute. Thomson also spent two years (1989–91) as a postdoctoral research fellow in the Primate In Vitro Fertilization and Experimental Embryology Laboratory at the Oregon National Primate Research Center, and completed a residency in veterinary pathology at the University of Wisconsin–Madison (1991–1994). He joined the Wisconsin Regional (now National) Primate Research Center on campus as its chief pathologist in 1995. There, he became the first in the world to successfully isolate and culture nonhuman primate embryonic stem cells. This led to his human embryonic stem cell discovery in 1998.

== Current employment ==
He serves as Director of Regenerative Biology at the Morgridge Institute for Research in Madison, Wisconsin, is a professor in the Department of Cell and Regenerative Biology at the University of Wisconsin School of Medicine and Public Health and a professor in the Molecular, Cellular, and Developmental Biology Department at the University of California, Santa Barbara. He is also a founder of Cellular Dynamics International, a Madison-based company producing derivatives of human induced pluripotent stem cells for drug discovery and toxicity testing.

== Awards ==
Thomson is a member of the National Academy of Sciences and the recipient of numerous awards and prizes. In 1999, Thomson received the Golden Plate Award of the American Academy of Achievement. He was on the cover of TIME magazine's "America's Best in Science & Medicine" feature in 2001 for his work with human embryonic stem cells, and again in 2008 when the magazine named him one of the world's 100 most influential people for his derivation of human induced pluripotent stem cells. In 2011, Thomson was co-recipient, with Dr. Shinya Yamanaka, of the King Faisal International Prize and the Albany Medical Center Prize. In 2013, Thomson received an honorary doctor of science degree from the University of Illinois at Urbana-Champaign. He also won the 2013 McEwen Award for Innovation from the International Society for Stem Cell Research.
