= Pyros (bomb) =

Small Tactical Munition
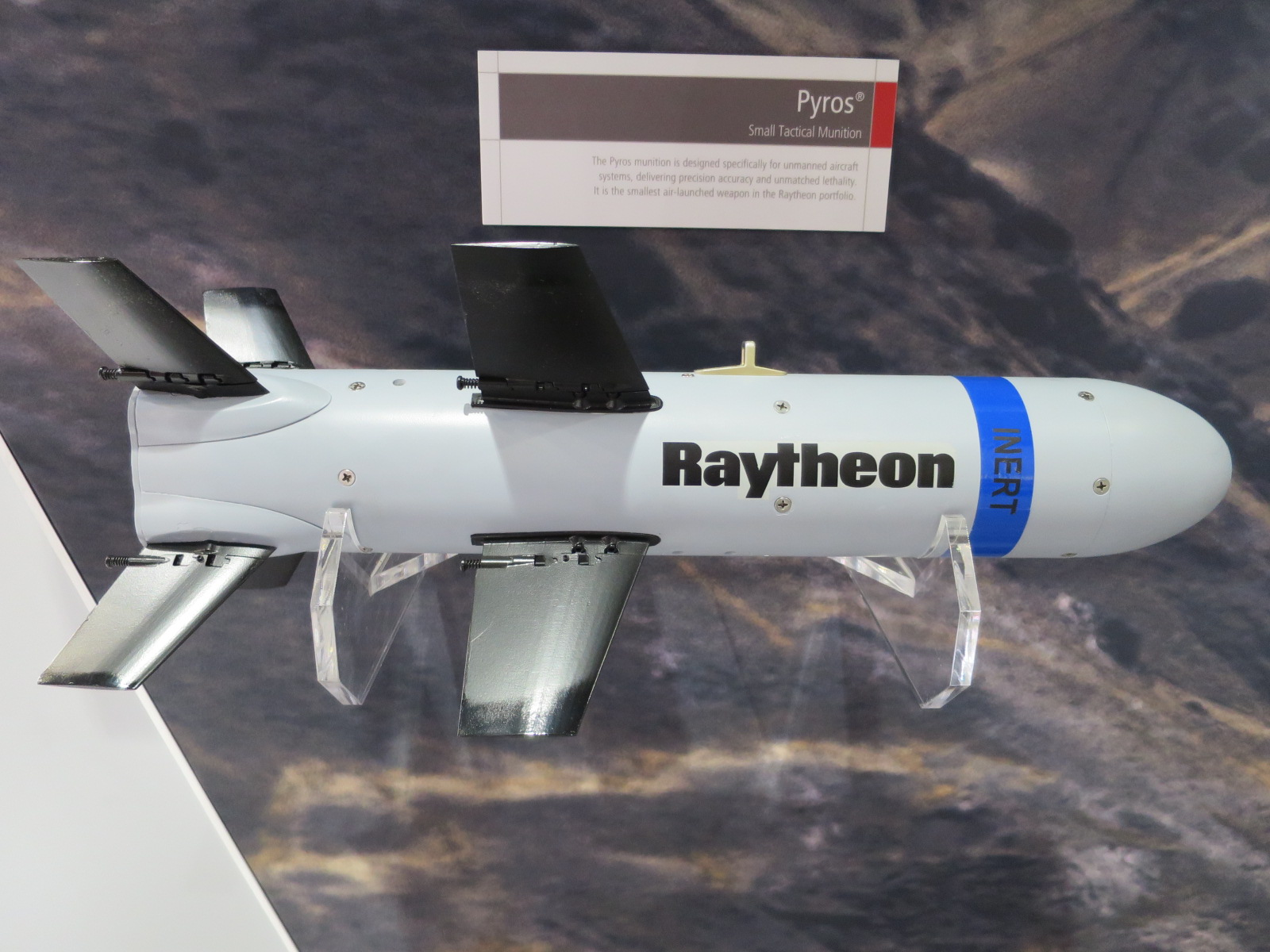
- Raytheon Pyros mockup at IDEX 2017
- Type: UCAV bomb
- Place of origin: United States

Production history
- Manufacturer: Raytheon

Specifications
- Mass: 13 pounds (5.9 kg)
- Length: 55 centimetres (22 in)
- Guidance system: Dual-mode seeker: semi-active laser guidance plus GPS-INS
- Launch platform: UCAVs

The Pyros, previously referred to as the Small Tactical Munition (STM), is a weapon developed by Raytheon, designed to be used by UCAVs.

== History ==
Raytheon successfully conducted flight tests in October 2010, and it may be used to arm the AAI RQ-7 Shadow.

In July 2012, Raytheon claimed the STM could be "months" away from fielding.

In early August 2012, Raytheon renamed the munition Pyros and completed the first end-to-end test of the bomb.

The test validated the weapon's guidance modes, height-of-burst sensor, electronic safe and arm device, and multi-effects warhead.

On July 18, 2014, Raytheon conducted the first live-fire test of the Pyros. The munition targeted a simulated group of insurgents planting a roadside bomb and used its height-of-burst sensor to detonate several feet above the ground.

== Design ==
The original model weighs 13 pounds (5.9 kg), and originally had a 7 lb (3.2 kg) warhead.

On April 18, 2011, Raytheon successfully tested a new 5 lb (2.3 kg) warhead for the weapon.

Though lighter, the new warhead has a significantly improved blast-fragment capability.

Designed for low collateral damage, its lethal radius is only 15 ft (4.6 m), with non-lethal effects extending further but lethality dropping dramatically.

Dropped from an altitude of 10,000 ft (3,000 m), the Pyros takes 35–40 seconds to reach the ground.
