= VMU-4 =

Marine Unmanned Aerial Vehicle Squadron 4
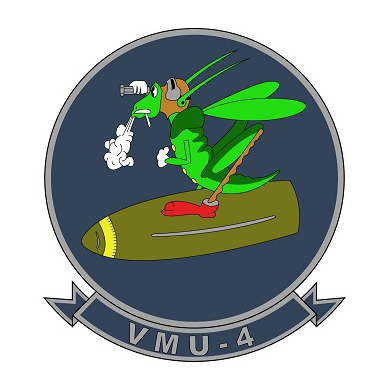
- VMU-4 squadron insignia
- Active: 1 July 2010 – 15 May 2022; As VMO-4: 20 Dec 1943 – 20 Oct 1945; 1 Sep 1962 – 31 Mar 1994
- Country: United States
- Branch: United States Marine Corps
- Type: Aerial reconnaissance
- Role: Reconnaissance, Surveillance, and Target Acquisition
- Size: TBD
- Part of: MAG-41, 4th MAW
- Garrison/HQ: Marine Corps Air Station Camp Pendleton
- Nickname: Evil Eyes
- Tail Codes: 7Y(1st); 5Y(2nd); MU(3rd)
- Engagements: Battle of Saipan; Battle of Iwo Jima

Aircraft flown
- Multirole helicopter: SH-34G/J Sea Bat
- Reconnaissance: OY-1 Grasshopper; OV-10 Bronco; RQ-7B Shadow

Marine Unmanned Aerial Vehicle Squadron 4 (VMU-4) was an unmanned aerial vehicle (UAV) squadron in the United States Marine Corps that operated the RQ-21 Blackjack. It was the fourth UAV squadron in the Marine Corps and the first in the reserve component. The squadron, nicknamed the "Evil Eyes", entered the force structure on 1 July 2010, when Marine Observation Squadron 4 (VMO-4) was reactivated and redesignated VMU-4. It was deactivated 15 May 2022

The squadron inherited the history of VMO-4 which was an observation squadron that saw extensive action during World War II. They were last based at Naval Air Station Atlanta near Atlanta, Georgia and were deactivated on 23 May 1993 as part of the post-Cold War drawdown of forces. VMU-4 is a subordinate unit of Marine Aircraft Group 41 and the 4th Marine Aircraft Wing.

== Mission ==
Provide aerial fire support spotting and intelligence in support of the Marine Air-Ground Task Force.

== History ==
=== World War II ===
The squadron was originally activated as Artillery Spotting Division (Marine Observation Squadron 951) (ASD(VMO-951)) on 20 December 1943 at Marine Corps Air Station Quantico, Virginia. This happened because the Marine Corps' field artillery school was located at Marine Corps Base Quantico. Less than a month later they were redesignated as Marine Observation Squadron 4 (VMO-4) as they trained to fly the OY-1 Grasshopper. The squadron would later move to San Diego, California and the deploy overseas to Marine Corps Air Station Ewa in Hawaii for further training where they would be assigned to support the V Amphibious Corps. In April 1944 they were sent to Maui for duty with the 4th Marine Division and on 29 May 1944 they left Pearl Harbor for their first combat mission.

The first two planes from VMO-4 landed on Charan-Kanoa airstrip during the Battle of Saipan on 17 June 1944 and began operating immediately. Six days later all squadron gear and personnel were ashore and the squadron shifted operations to Aslito Field. During the battle they their mission was to conduct tactical reconnaissance for ground troops and direct artillery and naval gunfire strikes. VMO-2 was the only other similar squadron to fly during the invasion of Saipan. Two months later two planes from the squadron would assist their fellow Marines during the week-long Battle of Tinian. During these two battles, the squadron flew 400 sorties and suffered 2 pilots killed. One after he crash landing after getting hit by enemy fire and another over Tinian. The Ground echelon of the squadron suffered 3 dead and 9 wounded during an enemy air raid. On 10 August 1944 the squadron set sail for Pearl Harbor to rest and refit.

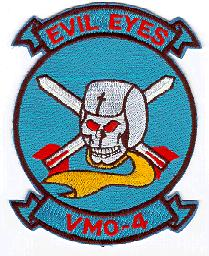
Old VMO-4 squadron insignia

VMO-4 personnel and gear remained in Hawaii until January 1945 when they set sail for Guam. While in Guam they received new aircraft and which were then flown to Saipan to be loaded upon escort carriers for movement to their next mission, the Battle of Iwo Jima. The squadron waited offshore to support Marines on the ground at Iwo until two planes from the USS Wake Island (CVE-65) were able to land at the airstrip on 26 February 1945. These were the first two aircraft to land on the newly captured airstrip and they did so while still under heavy small-arms and mortar fire. In time the mere presence of these small planes overhead would influence Japanese gunners to cease fire and button up against the inevitable counter-battery fire to follow. Often the pilots would undertake pre-dawn or dusk missions simply to extend this protective "umbrella" over the troops, risky flying given Iwo's unlit fields and constant enemy sniping from the adjacent hills. During the battle the squadron would fly 204 sorties in 19 days totaling 366.4 hours of flying. This would leave Six of the seven planes used so badly damaged that they were scrapped afterwards. After the battle they returned to Maui in April 1945 where they would remain until the end of the war.

Following the surrender of Japan, the squadron returned to San Diego, California where they were deactivated on 21 October 1945.

=== Cold war years ===
VMO-4 was reactivated on September 1, 1962 at Naval Air Station Grosse Ile, Michigan, from the personnel of HMR-761 and HMR-773, which had recently decommissioned. VMO-4 flew SH-34G/Js until November 1968, when the squadron became the first squadron in the reserves to receive the OV-10As.

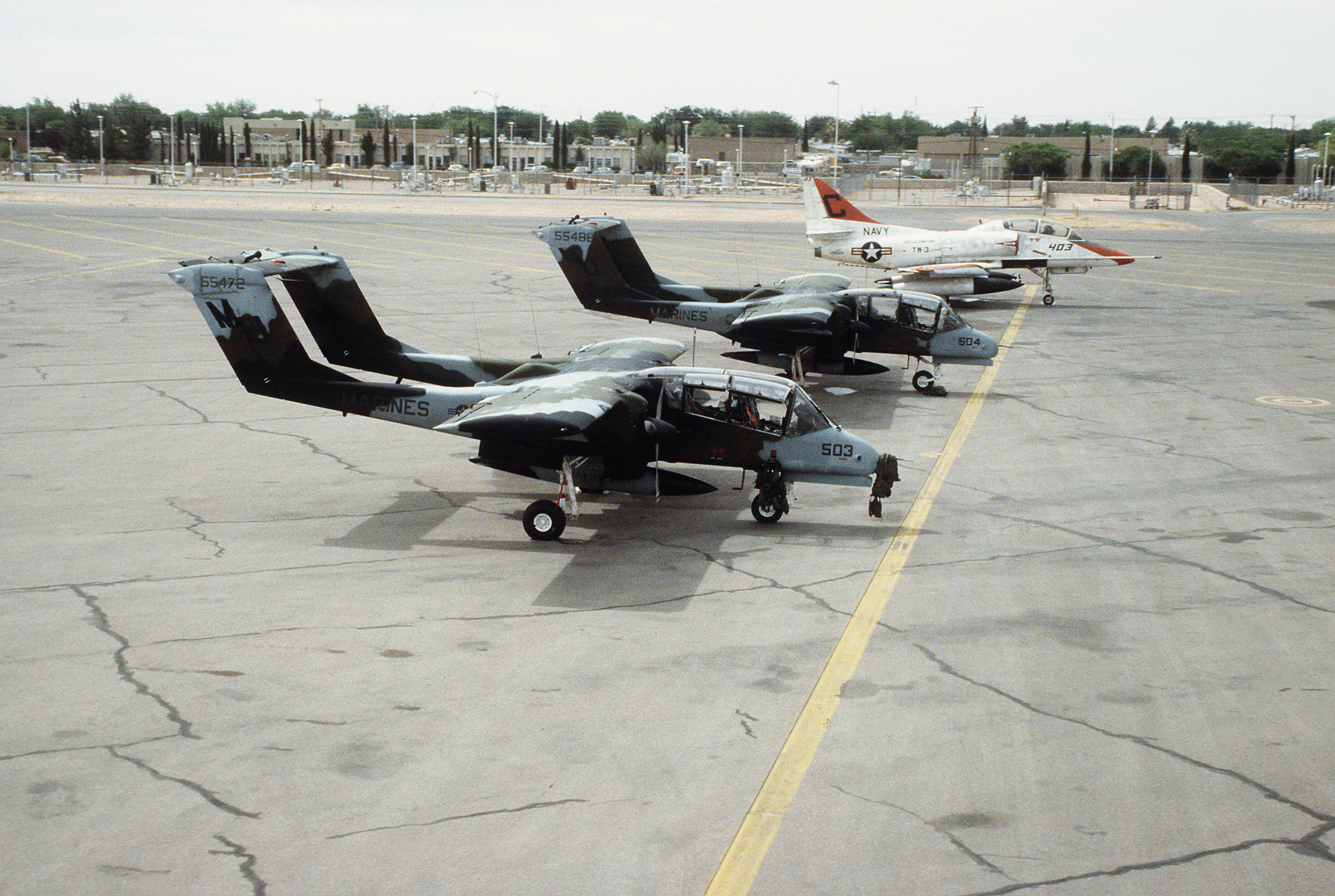
Two OV-10 Broncos from VMO-4 next to a TA-4J Skyhawk in 1990.

The squadron later relocated to Naval Air Station Atlanta during July 1976. The squadron was called to active service during the Gulf War time-period and become part of Marine Aircraft Group 29 at Marine Corps Air Station Cherry Point, North Carolina however it did not deploy overseas. The squadron was decommissioned on March 31, 1994 as part of the general drawdown of US forces following the end of the Cold War.

=== Reactivation as VMU-4 ===
The squadron was reactivated on 1 July 2010 and redesignated Marine Unmanned Aerial Vehicle Squadron 4 (VMU-4). VMU-4 is a subordinate unit of Marine Aircraft Group 41, 4th Marine Aircraft Wing.

VMU-4's first flight with the RQ-7B Shadow was 29 September 2010 in Yuma, AZ.

VMU-4 is now currently stationed at Camp Pendleton, California. They moved to Camp Pendleton officially on 22 February 2013.

=== Scheduled Deactivation ===
The squadron deactivated in May 2022

== Unit awards ==
Streamer	Award	Year(s)	Additional Info
	Presidential Unit Citation Streamer	14 June-1 August 1944; 19–28 Feb 1945	Saipan; Iwo Jima (pilots and observers only)
	Joint Meritorious Unit Award Streamer		
	Navy Unit Commendation Streamer	19–28 February 1945	Iwo Jima(ground echelon only)
	Meritorious Unit Commendation Streamer with one Bronze Star		
	Asiatic-Pacific Campaign Streamer with two Bronze Stars		Saipan, Iwo Jima
	World War II Victory Streamer	1941–1945	Pacific War
	National Defense Service Streamer	1990–1995	Gulf War

== See also ==
- United States Marine Corps Aviation
- Organization of the United States Marine Corps
- List of active United States Marine Corps aircraft squadrons
- List of decommissioned United States Marine Corps aircraft squadrons
- History of unmanned aerial vehicles
