= Daily Jolt =

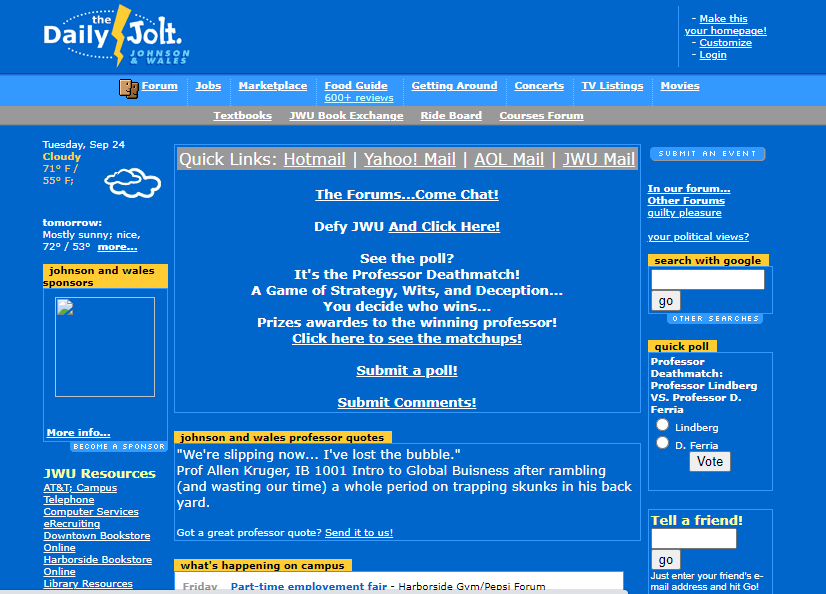

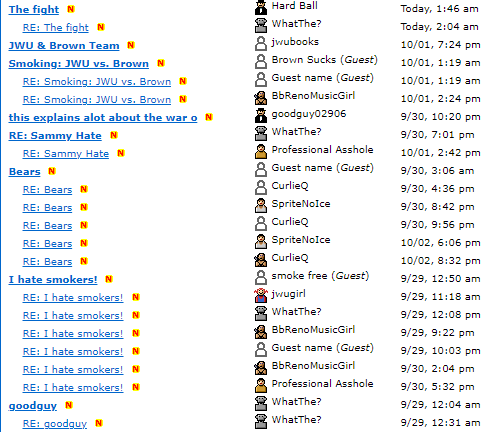

The Daily Jolt (2000–2010) was a network of online campus-specific community and news sites. It was founded by Amit Gupta, Noah Winer, and Seth Fitzsimmons at Amherst College. A site for Brown University was started by Mike Goelzer shortly thereafter, both which remained the most active school portals in the system during the decade it remained in business. At its peak, there were sites for more than 100 college campuses in the United States and Canada. The Daily Jolt was run by student volunteers at each school, known as "Jolters", and supported by a small staff located in Boston, Massachusetts.

When the founders left the growth and operations of The Daily Jolt went to Christopher Herron supported by Ron Ayers and Kendra Grimes. Mark Miller took the reins from Herron, serving as Executive Chairman. He re-capitalized the company and acquired CollegiateLink, which was founded by Aaron Severs and Mark Greene. Miller oversaw the growth of the two assets of what become known as NewDJ Corp. The Daily Jolt was sold to Chungdahm Learning and a year later after investing in the growth of CollegiateLink it was sold with a strong return on capital to Campus Labs which in turn sold to Higher One and then to Leeds Equity Partners.

Features of The Daily Jolt included The Love Monkey, a matchmaker system using blind mutual interest, cross-campus (multi-school) and school-specific forums, local and national job boards, and Yarn, a choose your own adventure web story writing system.

== List of campuses (incomplete) ==
- Amherst College
- Bard College at Simon's Rock
- Bates College
- Brown University
- Clarkson University
- The College of New Jersey
- Hampshire College
- Harvard University
- Johns Hopkins University
- Johnson & Wales University
- Millsaps College
- Mount Holyoke College
- Pacific Lutheran University
- Pennsylvania State University
- Rhode Island School of Design
- Texas A&M University
- Truman State University
- Tulane University
- University of Massachusetts Amherst
- Smith College
- Xavier University of Louisiana
- Swarthmore College
- University of Rochester
