= Cellular Dynamics International =

Biotechnology company

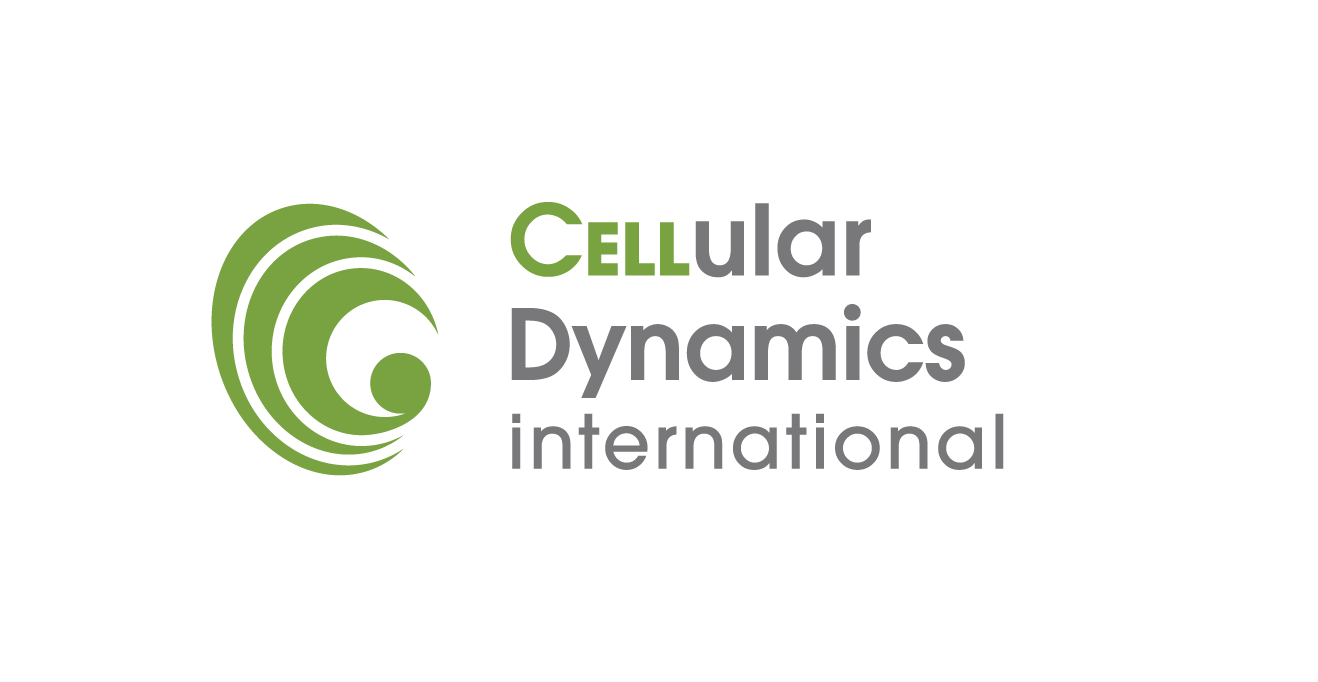
- Type: Private
- Traded as: Nasdaq: ICEL
- Industry: Biotechnology
- Founded: 2004; 22 years ago
- Founder: James Thomson, Craig January, Timothy Kamp].
- Headquarters: Tokyo, Japan
- Total equity: US$4,280,000,000 (2020)
- Website: www.fujifilmcdi.com

Fujifilm Cellular Dynamics, Inc. (FCDI) is a large scale manufacturer of human cells, created from induced pluripotent stem cells, for use in basic research, drug discovery and regenerative medicine applications.

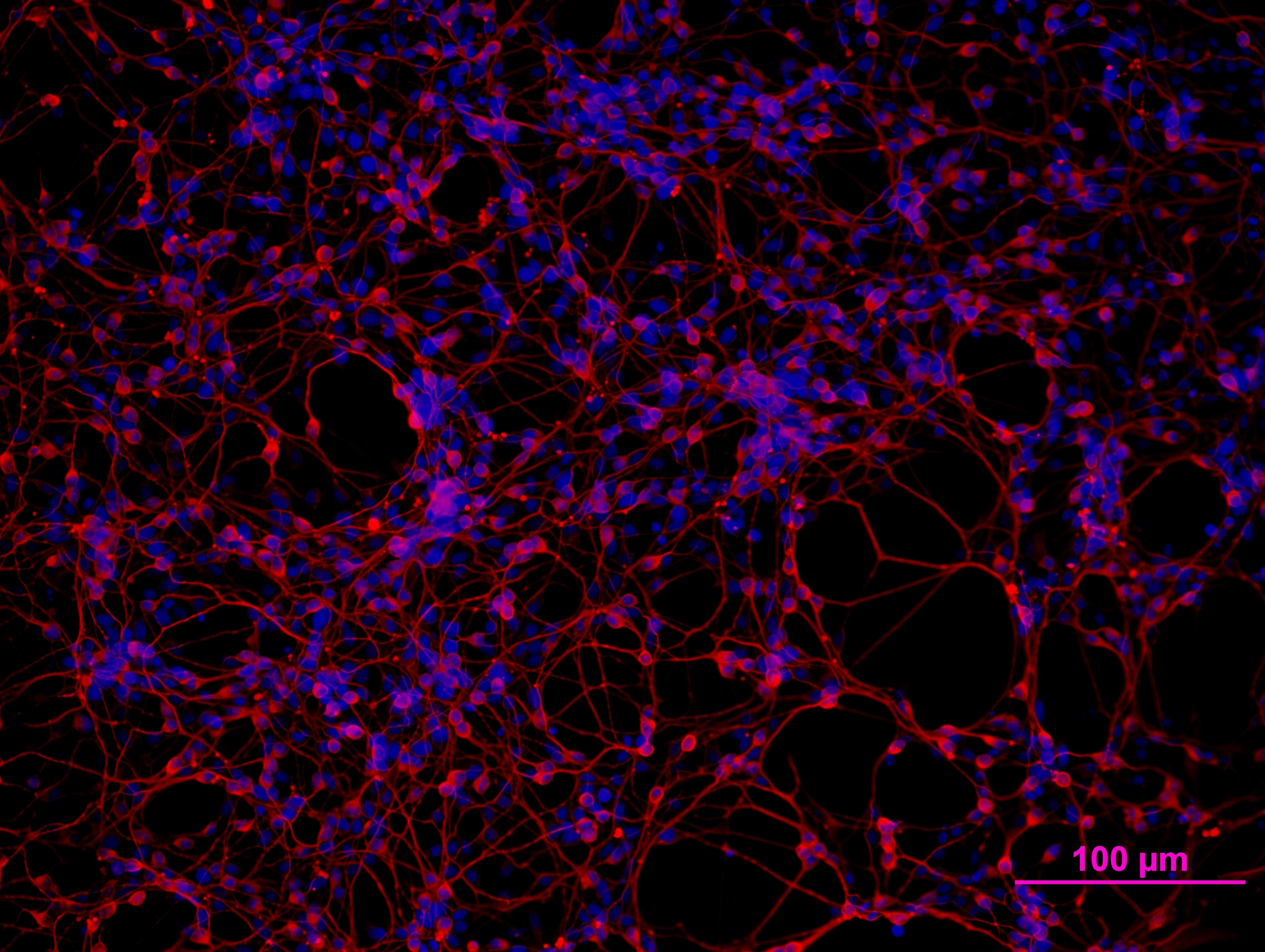
FCDI iCell Neurons with beta-III tubulin (a neuronal marker) stained red and nuclei stained blue with Hoechst

== History ==
Prior to acquisition, the company then named Cellular Dynamics International, Inc. tendered an initial public offering in July 2013 under the ticker symbol ICEL. On March 30, 2015, Fujifilm Holdings Corporation announced an agreement to acquire Cellular Dynamics International for $307 million or $16.50/share on a fully diluted basis. The company was subsequently renamed Fujifilm Cellular Dynamics, Inc.

Human cells are considered to be a more predictive model and a replacement for other cellular models that serve as proxies, including animal cells, immortalized cell lines, and cadaveric cells.

FCDI offers several terminally differentiated cell types as catalog products: iCell® Cardiomyocytes, iCell Neurons, iCell Endothelial Cells, and iCell Hepatocytes. CDI's MyCell® Products portfolio enables customer-provided donor samples to be reprogrammed, gene edited, and differentiated. The company also has several prototype products derived from pluripotent stem cells, including iCell Cardiac Progenitors, iCell Hematopoietic Progenitors, iCell Astrocytes, and iCell Skeletal Myoblasts.

FCDI corporate headquarters are located in Madison, Wisconsin. In 2013, FCDI was awarded a US$16,000,000 contract from the California Institute for Regenerative Medicine to reprogram and bank iPS cells from 3,000 individuals. The CIRM biorepository is managed by FCDI and housed at a sister company, Fujifilm Irvine Scientific, in Irvine, CA.

As of 2013, FCDI has more than 800 patents and licensed technologies as part of their technology portfolio.

== Recognition ==
FCDI appeared on MIT Technology Review's "Disruptive Companies" list in both 2011 and 2012.

FCDI was recognized by The Scientist for having among the year's "Top 10 Innovations" in 2010 for the iCell Cardiomyocyte product, and in 2012 for the MyCell Product. The iCell Cardiomyocyte product was also recognized in 2010 by MIT Technology Review as being among the year's "Top 10 Emerging Technologies". In 2011, the same product received Gold Winner status in The Wall Street Journal's "Technology Innovation Award".

== Application areas ==
=== Toxicity ===
FCDI began to develop drug compound safety applications early in the company's product development cycle. Several published studies have used FCDI products to investigate mechanisms of toxicity and have leveraged cellular models to identify toxicity earlier in the drug development process. Unexpected toxicity is one of the leading reasons that drugs are pulled from the market or from late stage clinical trials and toxicity issues greatly increase the cost of drug development.

=== Drug discovery ===
FCDI cells enable new strategies for disease modeling and drug discovery work. Because FCDI's MyCell Products are created using custom iPS cell reprogramming and differentiation processes, they provide biologically relevant human cells from donors with specific disease-associated genotypes and phenotypes. The company's iCell and MyCell cells are readily adapted to screening platforms and demonstrate functionality using widely accepted readout technologies. FCDI's products are used in high throughput screens, and have been used as supporting data in Investigational New Drug (IND) submissions to the FDA.

=== Regenerative medicine ===
Reprogramming technology enables new ways to study disease mechanisms and modeling. Researchers can reprogram diseased cells of interest to study how a particular disease affects those cell types and to discover methods of repairing the cells. FCDI's iCell and MyCell products are being used to research the development of regenerative medicine approaches, including: regenerative medicine compound screening, allogeneic and autologous cell therapy, tissue engineering, and transplantation. Specifically in the area of tissue engineering, FCDI's iCell and MyCell products are being employed across a variety of technologies, such as implantable devices, de-cellularized organ reconstitution and 3D bioprinting.

=== Stem cell banking ===
FCDI is actively engaged in a number of large-scale iPS cell reprogramming and banking projects, with the goal of creating broadly available resources of iPS cells that represent normal human diversity, disease states and adverse drug reactions. In 2013, CIRM awarded FCDI a US$16,000,000 grant to derive 3 iPS cell lines from each of 3,000 donors that represent a multitude of disease states. This project follows a $6.3 million grant awarded by the National Heart, Lung, and Blood Institute to FCDI and the Medical College of Wisconsin to investigate the mechanisms underlying left ventricular hypertrophy. FCDI's role in this project is to generate iPS cell lines and cardiomyocytes from 250 donors selected from the Hypertension Genetic Epidemiology Network (HyperGEN) GWAS study.

== Product areas ==
=== Cardiac ===
The company's first product, iCell Cardiomyocytes, have been used extensively in pharmaceutical research and drug development applications. Other stem cell derived Cardiomyocytes are available commercially from GE Healthcare, Cellectis, Reprocell and others. iCell Cardiomyocytes have been found to display electrical properties similar to those of human cardiomyocytes. iCell Cardiomyocytes have also been used for drug safety testing, toxicology testing, drug screening and Investigational New Drug (IND) filings. iCell Cardiac Progenitor Cells (CPCs) are part of the FCDI Cardiac portfolio; these cells launched in 2014 for use in heart failure research.

=== Neural ===
iCell Neurons have been used across several different research areas, including Parkinson's disease, toxicity, autism, Alzheimer's disease, and virology FCDI expanded their neural product portfolio by launching iCell Astrocytes and iCell Dopaminergic Neurons. Other manufacturers of stem cell derived neurons include ArunA Biomedical and ReproCell.

=== Hepatic ===
iCell Hepatocytes are used in a variety of ways, including prediction of hepatotoxicity in drug development applications. Adverse and unexpected hepatic side effects are one of the most common reasons for drugs to be removed from the market after launch or in late phase clinical trials iCell Hepatocytes are used as a tool for better predicting hepatic toxicity earlier in the drug discovery process. Other companies that provide hepatocytes include Cellectis and Life Technologies.

=== Vascular and blood ===
At least 5 of the top 10 Leading Causes of Death in the United States have a vascular component related to their disease. Endothelial cells (cells that line the interior of blood vessels and allow nutrients to pass back and forth to the body's organs and tissues) play an important role in the study of vascular contributions of many leading causes of death. iCell Endothelial cells were launched as a tool to model vascular biology. Other types of endothelial cells are available from ATCC and Life Technologies. iCell Hematopoietic Progenitor Cells are multipotent progenitor blood cells that can give rise to many different types of blood cells that can then be used for a variety of research purposes, including cell therapy, autoimmune disease, and cancer research.

=== Donor cells ===
FCDI offers a family of products called MyCell Products that involve custom reprogramming, genetic engineering and differentiation of a customer's own cell samples. The technology driving MyCell Products enables customers to study their disease of interest or correct a genetic disease phenotype using genome editing technology. Studies have shown that disease cell reprogramming can result in cells that display the particular disease morphology, providing an opportunity to study the disease as never before.
