= Current density imaging =

- [edit on Wikidata]

Current density imaging (CDI) is an extension of magnetic resonance imaging (MRI), developed at the University of Toronto. It employs two techniques for spatially mapping electric current pathways through tissue:

- LF-CDI, low-frequency CDI, the original implementation developed at the University of Toronto. In this technique, low frequency (LF) electric currents are injected into the tissue. These currents generate magnetic fields, which are then measured using MRI techniques. The current pathways are then computed and spatially mapped.
- RF-CDI, radio frequency CDI, a rotating frame of reference version of LF-CDI. This allows measurement of a single component of current density, without requiring subject rotation. The high frequency current that is injected into tissue also does not cause the muscle twitching often encountered using LF-CDI, allowing in-vivo measurements on human subjects.

== See also ==
- Magnetic resonance imaging
