= ASC CDL =

Format for the exchange of basic primary color grading information

The American Society of Cinematographers Color Decision List (ASC CDL) is a format for the exchange of basic primary color grading information between equipment and software from different manufacturers. The format defines the math for three functions: Slope, Offset and Power. Each function uses a number for the red, green, and blue color channels for a total of nine numbers comprising a single color decision. A tenth number, Saturation, specified in the Version 1.2 release, applies to the R, G, and B color channels in combination.

The ASC CDL was developed by the ASC Technology Committee, a combined group of cinematographers, post-production engineers, and other motion picture industry professionals.

Although the basic controls of most color correction systems are similar, they differ somewhat in specific implementation and detail. The ASC CDL is a common standard that color correctors can translate their proprietary settings to and from. The ASC CDL functions are mathematically orthogonal primitives that can be used to represent vendor-specific corrections. ASC CDL correction functions also in some cases can appear in the user interface and be used directly.

The ASC CDL allows color corrections made with one device at one location to be applied or modified by other devices elsewhere. For example, a cinematographer filming on location can create a color correction with a small portable device, sending the ASC CDL color correction to a colorist in post-production to use as a starting point for final color correction. To communicate "looks" usefully in this fashion, calibrations, viewing environments, devices, and any output transforms (e.g. film look) must be managed very carefully; in general, they should be identical at origination and subsequent viewing.

The ASC has defined an XML schema for exchanging ASC CDL data, along with other metadata about what image(s) the color corrections were applied to, the type of input signal used, and the viewing device and environment. They have also standardized methods for using ASC CDL data within the following file formats:

- Avid Log Exchange (ALE)
- Film Log EDL Exchange (FLEx)
- CMX Edit Decision List

== Combined Function ==
The formula for ASC CDL color correction is:

$$out = (i \times s+o)^p\,$$

where

$out$ is the color graded pixel code value
$i$ is the input pixel code value (0=black, 1=white)
$s$ is slope (any number 0 or greater, nominal value is 1.0)
$o$ is offset (any number, nominal value is 0)
$p$ is power (any number greater than 0, nominal value is 1.0)

The formula is applied to the three color values for each pixel using the corresponding slope, offset, and power numbers for each color channel.

== Current Release ==
Instructions for getting the current release of ASC CDL implementor-oriented documentation can be retrieved by sending an e-mail to asc-cdl at theasc dot com.

== See also ==
- Academy Color Encoding System
- Color grading
- Color Management
- Colour look-up table
- Telecine
