= Canadian Defence Lawyers =

Association of Canadian civil defence lawyers

The Canadian Defence Lawyers is an association of Canadian civil defence lawyers. It provides specific education and a forum for information exchange within the membership.

== History and function ==
Canadian Defence Lawyers (CDL) is the only national organization representing the interests of civil defence lawyers in Canada. Founded in 1995, the association now has over 1400 lawyer members from coast to coast. This non-profit organization's mission is to be a voice and a resource for civil defence lawyers providing a national perspective, quality defence-specific education and networking opportunities.

CDL offers defence lawyers access to defence-oriented Continuing Legal Education (CLE). It presents in-person programmes in Vancouver, Edmonton, Calgary, Toronto, Ottawa, Halifax and Moncton. It offers an education program annually in conjunction with its annual general meeting. Other educational programs are offered by teleconference, DVD and webcast.

The association hosts a website for members to register for CLE, manage their membership profile, view employment postings throughout the profession, purchase educational materials, and search for other CDL members. Regional communities on the website are one of the most useful tools of this association, allowing members instant contact with other members for discussion about legal updates, experts retainer, and other issues for defence civil litigators.

CDL is governed by a board of directors which includes members from across Canada. The executive committee is made up of president, first vice-president, second vice president, secretary/treasurer and past president. A board member's term is three years. CDL has a staff of five, including an executive director, an education director, a membership coordinator, a technology specialist and a financial advisor.

Canadian Defence Lawyers is a member organization within Defense Research Institute (DRI – The Voice of the Defense Bar), a 22,000-strong group of insurance and corporate litigation lawyers based in Chicago, Illinois.

== Association awards ==
The Lee Samis Canadian Defence Lawyers Award for distinguished service, named for the founding president of CDL, was created to recognize exceptional contributions and/or achievements by members of CDL to the legal profession in general, to jurisprudence in Canada on the law of insurance. An award dinner is held annually to honour the recipient of each year's award. Past winners of this award include:

- 2021 – John Barry, ONB, QC
- 2020 – Alison Murray QC
- 2019 – Eric Grossman
- 2018 – Patricia Armstrong QC
- 2017 – Clarence Beckett QC
- 2016 – Paul Tushinski
- 2015 – Dennis Quinlan QC
- 2014 – Hon. Sandra L. Corbett QC
- 2013 – Geoff Adair QC
- 2012 – Heather Sanderson
- 2011 – Jan Lindsay Q.C.
- 2010 – David Hashey Q.C.
- 2009 – Mary Helen Wright
- 2008 – Rick Davison Q.C.
- 2007 – Graham Dutton
- 2006 – Richard Lindsay Q.C.
- 2005 – Hon. Harrison Arrell
- 2004 – Thomas McGrenere
- 2003 – David Mille Q.C.
- 2002 – Philippa Samworth

The Richard B. Lindsay, Q.C. Young Lawyer Award, named for a past president of CDL, was created in 2010 to recognize achievement and community service by a young lawyer member. 2019 Exceptional Young Lawyer Award Winner: Alison Hopkins 2018 Exceptional Young Lawyer Award Winner: John Lea 2017 Exceptional Young Lawyer Award Winner: Jason Frost 2016 Exceptional Young Lawyer Award Winner: Andrea Lim 2015 Exceptional Young Lawyer Award Winner: Laura Emmett 2012 Exceptional Young Lawyer Award Winner: Stuart Zacharias 2010 Exceptional Young Lawyer Award Winner: Kadey J. Schultz
