= Common Data Link =

Military communications protocol

Common Data Link (CDL) is a secure U.S. military communication protocol. It was established by the U.S. Department of Defense in 1991 as the military's primary protocol for imagery and signals intelligence. CDL operates within the K_{u} band at data rates up to 274 Mbit/s. CDL allows for full duplex data exchange. CDL signals are transmitted, received, synchronized, routed, and simulated by Common data link (CDL) Interface Boxes (CIBs).

The FY06 Authorization Act (Public Law 109-163) requires use of CDL for all imagery, unless waiver is granted. The primary reason waivers are granted is from the inability to carry the 300 pound radios on a small (30 pound) aircraft. Emerging technology expects to field a 2-pound version by the end of the decade (2010).

The Tactical Common Data Link (TCDL) is a secure data link being developed by the U.S. military to send secure data and streaming video links from airborne platforms to ground stations. The TCDL can accept data from many different sources, then encrypt, multiplex, encode, transmit, demultiplex, and route this data at high speeds. It uses a K_{u} narrowband uplink that is used for both payload and vehicle control, and a wideband downlink for data transfer.

The TCDL uses both directional and omnidirectional antennas to transmit and receive the K_{u} band signal. The TCDL was designed for UAVs, specifically the MQ-8B Fire Scout, as well as crewed non-fighter environments. The TCDL transmits radar, imagery, video, and other sensor information at rates from 1.544 Mbit/s to 10.7 Mbit/s over ranges of 200 km. It has a bit error rate of 10e-6 with COMSEC and 10e-8 without COMSEC. It is also intended that the TCDL will in time support the required higher CDL rates of 45, 137, and 274 Mbit/s.
