= Alliant RQ-6 Outrider =

Canceled American unmanned aerial vehicle

RQ-6 Outrider
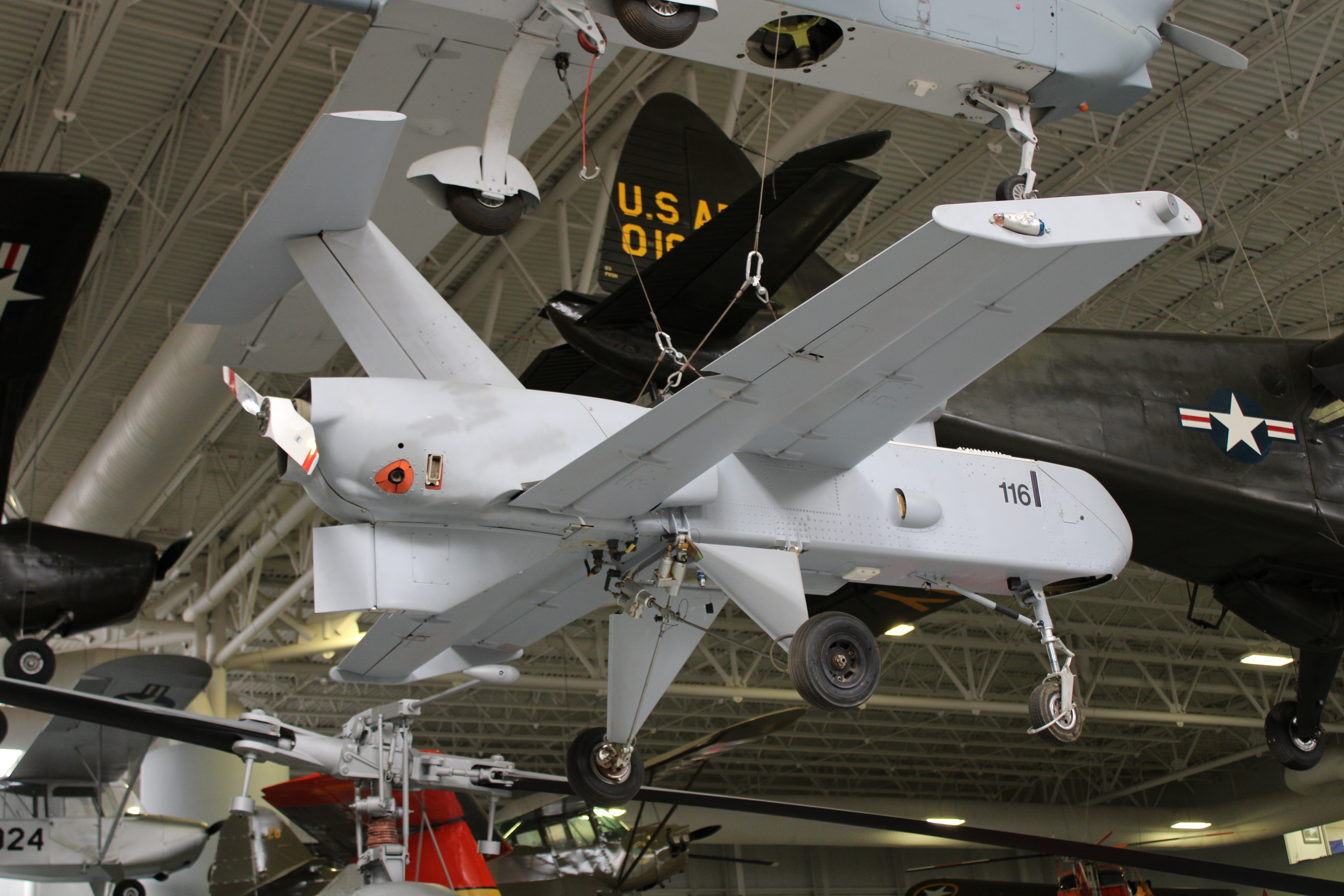
- Alliant RQ-6A Outrider at the United States Army Aviation Museum

General information
- Type: Remote controlled UAV
- Manufacturer: Alliant Techsystems
- Status: Canceled
- Primary users: United States Marine Corps United States Army, United States Navy

History
- Manufactured: 1996–1999
- Retired: 1999

The Alliant RQ-6 Outrider unmanned aerial vehicle (UAV) was designed to provide near-real-time reconnaissance, surveillance, and target acquisition information to United States Marine Corps air/ground task forces, United States Army brigades, and deployed United States Navy units that was small enough for an entire system to be contained on two Humvees and trailer and transported on a single C-130 Hercules cargo aircraft.

The project began in 1996 and was canceled in 1999.

The "R" is the Department of Defense designation for reconnaissance; "Q" means unmanned aircraft system. The "6" refers to its being the sixth of a series of purpose-built unmanned aircraft systems.

== Specifications ==
Data from GlobalSecurity.org, UAV Annual Report FY 1996

General characteristics

- Capacity: 60 lb (27 kg) payload
- Length: 9 ft 10.8 in (3.018 m)
- Wingspan: 11 ft 1.2 in (3.383 m)
- Height: 5 ft 1 in (1.55 m)
- Empty weight: 300 lb (136 kg)
- Powerplant: 1 × McCulloch 4318F 4-cylinder air-cooled horizontally-opposed piston engine, 50 hp (37 kW)
- Propellers: 2-bladed fixed-pitch pusher propeller

Performance

- Maximum speed: 110 kn (130 mph, 200 km/h)
- Cruise speed: 90 kn (100 mph, 170 km/h)
- Stall speed: 34 kn (39 mph, 63 km/h)
- Endurance: 4.9 hours loitering at 108 nmi (124 mi; 200 km) 7.2 hours loitering at 27 nmi (31 mi; 50 km)
- Service ceiling: 15,000 ft (4,600 m)
- Rate of climb: 1,600 ft/min (8.1 m/s)
- Operating altitude: 5,000 ft (1,524 m)

== See also ==
- Unmanned Aerial Vehicle
- Unmanned Combat Air Vehicle

Related lists

- List of active United States military aircraft
