= Chodiala railway station =

Railway station in Uttar Pradesh, India

General information
- Location: MDR 163W, Uttar Pradesh; India
- Coordinates: 29.8957°N 77.7373°E
- Elevation: 275 metres (902 ft)
- System: Indian Railways station
- Owner: Indian Railways
- Operator: Moradabad railway division
- Platforms: 2
- Tracks: 4 (double electrified broad gauge)
- Connections: Auto stand

Construction
- Structure type: Standard (on-ground station)
- Parking: No
- Cycle facilities: No

Other information
- Status: Functioning
- Station code: CDL
- Fare zone: Northern Railway
Location
- Location within India Location within Uttar Pradesh

Chodiala railway station is a railway station in Saharanpur district, Uttar Pradesh. Its code is CDL. It serves Chodiala city. The station consists of two platforms. The platforms are not well sheltered. It lacks many facilities including water and sanitation. The station is located 14 km from Roorkee and 21 km from Saharanpur.

== Major trains ==
- Saharanpur–Moradabad Passenger (unreserved)
- Haridwar–Delhi Passenger (unreserved)
- Saharanpur–Lucknow Passenger
- Rishikesh–Old Delhi Passenger (unreserved)
- Dehradun–Saharanpur Passenger (unreserved)
