= Chungdahm Learning =

South Korean private education company

- Tutoring for the 21st century
- Native name: 청담러닝
- Company type: Public
- Traded as: KRX: 096240
- Industry: Education
- Founded: 1998 in Seoul, South Korea
- Founder: Young Hwa Kim
- Headquarters: Seoul, South Korea
- Number of locations: 200+
- Brands: Chungdahm Institute, April Institute, i-Garten, Quick Chinese
- Revenue: USD 129 million (2016)
- Number of employees: FTEs: 420 (2016); Instructors: 1,300 (2016)
- Website: company.chungdahm.com

Chungdahm Learning is a private student education company in South Korea, with over 130,000 students across more than 200 schools. Chungdahm Learning has schools, and services operating in North America, South America, China, Japan and Vietnam. Chungdahm Institute (CDI), a subsidiary of Chungdahm Learning, is an English language hagwon (private after-school academy) program.

== History ==
Chungdahm Learning was founded in 1998 by CEO Young Hwa Kim, starting as Chungdahm Institute (CDI) and incorporating in 2002. Chungdahm Learning focuses on teaching English as a second language through test prep, critical thinking, and literature content modules. Chungdahm's methodology implements the use of smart classrooms using tablet PCs and smart textbooks, a first in Korea.

It launched April Institute to target younger elementary school students in 2007 and was listed on the KOSDAQ market in 2008. In 2012, Chungdahm Learning acquired CMS Education (Creative Math & Science). In 2013, Chungdahm 3.0, a smart learning solution, was launched to operate Smart Class at CDL schools. In April 2014, Chungdahm announced plans to partner with Knewton to incorporate adaptive learning into its curriculum. Chungdahm entered into partnerships with Apax Holdings and EGroup in 2016 to expand Chungdahm's market presence into Vietnam.

In 2022, Chungdahm and CMS began functioning together under the Creverse brand.

== Controversy ==
In 2015, a group of former CDI teachers won recognition as full-time employees by the Supreme Court of Korea entitling the teachers to unpaid severance pay and other benefits. Chungdahm Learning was found to have run a scheme treating foreign teachers as independent contractors instead of employees in contravention of the Labor Standards Act, thereby saving costs by not paying severance contributions to pension or health insurance.

Also in 2015, an employee of an April branch of Chungdahm Learning denied a job application from a person of color on the basis of race, asserting that their customers preferred Caucasian teachers. Park Kyung-ha, a spokeswoman for Chungdahm, admitted that the job posting was against the guidelines of CDI and the branch owner offered an apology and promise to not post discriminatory job listings in the future.
