= List of aircraft of the Israeli Air Force =

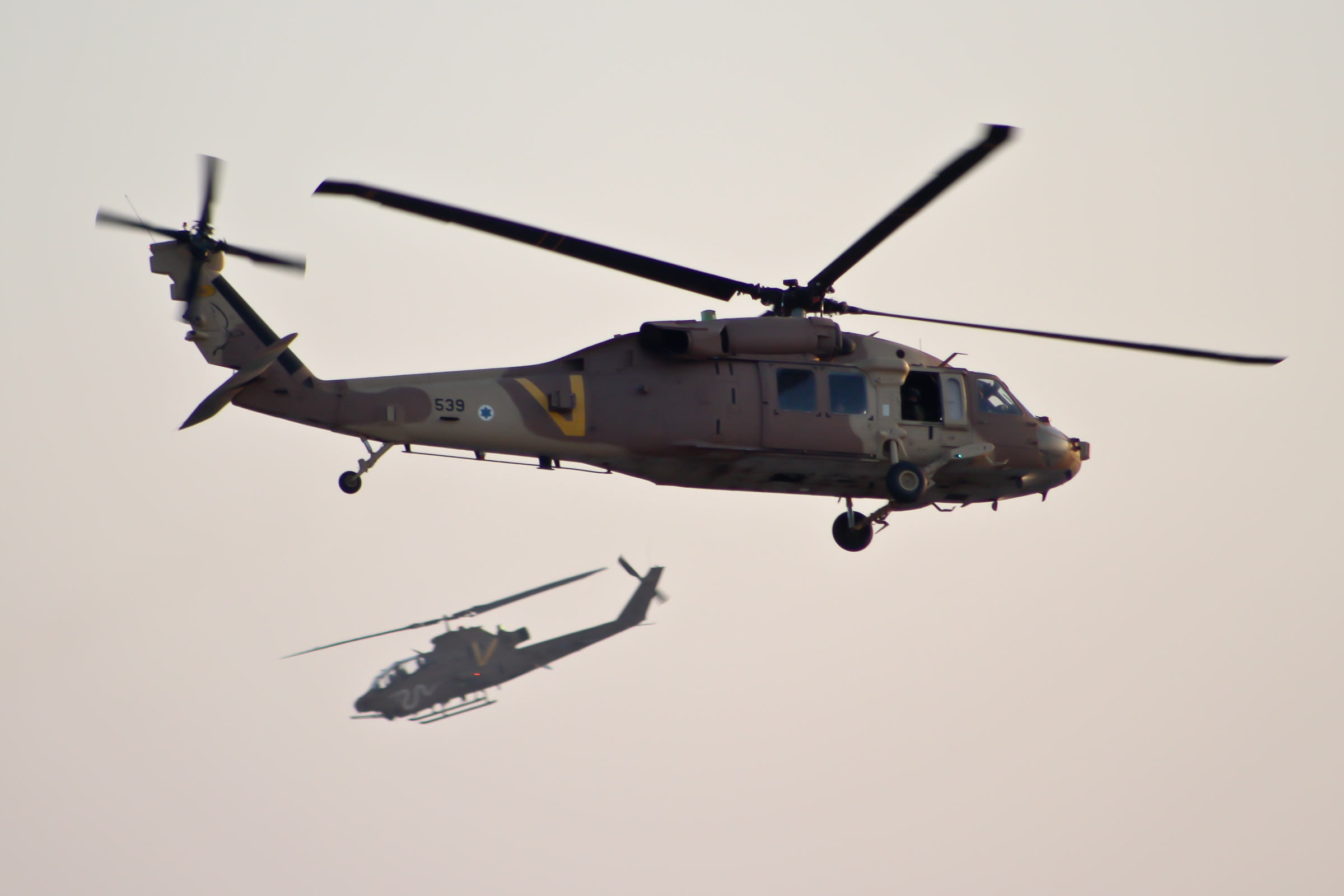
Israeli Air Force UH-60 Blackhawk and AH-1 Cobra

List of aircraft of the Israeli Air Force:

Aircraft highlighted in blue are currently in service.

== Fixed wing combat types ==
Designation	Entered Service	Left Service	Hebrew designation
(Czechoslovakia) Avia S-199	1948	1950	Sakin (Knife) סכין
(United States) Boeing B-17 Flying Fortress	1948	1958	
(United Kingdom) Bristol Beaufighter	1948	1948	
(France) Dassault Mirage IIIC	1962	1986	Shahak (Sky) שחק
(France) Dassault Mirage 5	n/a	n/a	50 ordered 1966, not delivered
(France) Dassault Mystère IV	1955	1971	
(France) Dassault Ouragan	1955	1971	
(France) Dassault Super Mystère B2	1958	1976	Sambad (Hebrew acronym of "Super Mystère B Deux") סמב"ד
(France) Fouga CM.170 Magister	1957	1967	Tzukit (Monticola) צוקית
(United Kingdom) de Havilland Mosquito	1948	1958	
(United States) Douglas A-4 Skyhawk	1968	2015	Ayit (Eagle) עיט
(United States) General Dynamics F-16A/B	1980	2016	Netz (Hawk) נץ
(United States) General Dynamics F-16C	1987	2024	Barak (Lightning) ברק
(United States) General Dynamics F-16D	1986	-	Barak (Lightning) ברק
(United Kingdom) Gloster Meteor	1953	1970	
(Israel) IAI Kfir	1975	1996	Kfir (Lion Cub) כפיר
(Israel) IAI Nesher	1971	1986	Nesher (Vulture) נשר
(Israel) IAI Lavi	1986	1987	Lavi (Lion) לביא
(United States) Lockheed Martin F-16I	2004	-	Sufa (Storm) סופה
(United States) Lockheed Martin F-35I	2016	-	Adir (Mighty) אדיר
(United States) McDonnell Douglas F-15A/B/C/D	1976	-	Baz (Falcon) בז
(United States) McDonnell Douglas F-15I	1998	-	Ra'am (Thunder) רעם
(United States) McDonnell Douglas F-4 Phantom II	1969	2004	Kurnass (Sledgehammer) קורנס
(United States) North American P-51 Mustang	1948	1961	
(France) Sud Aviation S.O. 4050 Vautour IIA/N	1957	1971	
(United Kingdom) Supermarine Spitfire	1948	1956	Yorek יורק (Spitter)

== Fixed wing auxiliary ==
Designation	Entered Service	Left Service	Hebrew designation
(United Kingdom) Auster J/1 Autocrat	1947	1950	Primus פרימוס
(United States) Beechcraft Queen Air B-80	1974	2003	Zamir (Nightingale) זמיר
(United States) Beechcraft Bonanza	1948	-	Hofit (Stint) חופית
(United States) Beechcraft C-45 Expeditor	1960	?	
(United States) Beechcraft Super King Air	1974	-	Cuckia/Tzufit (Cuckoo/Sunbird) קוקיה/צופית
(United States) Boeing 377 Stratocruiser/C-97	1963	1977	Anak (Giant) ענק
(United States) Boeing 707	1972	-	Re'em (Oryx) ראם
(United Kingdom) Britten-Norman Islander	1973	1982	
(United States) Cessna 172	1967	1991	שחפית
(United States) Cessna 180/182/185	1977	1994	
(United States) Cessna U206 Super Skywagon	1968	1998	
(United States) Consolidated PBY Catalina	1952	1961	
(United States) Curtiss C-46 Commando	1948	1971	
(United Kingdom) de Havilland Tiger Moth	1947	1949	
(United Kingdom) de Havilland Dragon Rapide DH.89	1947	1949	
(Germany) Dornier Do 27	1964	1994	Dror (Sparrow) דרור
(Germany) Dornier Do 28	1971	2001	Agur (Crane) עגור
(United States) Douglas DC-3/C-47 Skytrain	1948	2000	
(United States) Douglas DC-4/C-54 Skymaster	1948	1949	
(United States) Douglas DC-5	1948	1955	
(United States) Fairchild Argus	1948	?	
(United States) Grumman E-2 Hawkeye	1978	2002	Daya (Kite bird) דיה
(United States) Grumman G-44 Widgeon	1948	?	
(United States) Grumman OV-1 Mohawk	1974	1978	Atalef (Bat) עטלף
(United States) Gulfstream V / Gulfstream G550	2005		Nachshon, Shavit, Eitam, Oron
(Israel) IAI Arava	1973	2004	Arava (Prairie) ערבה
(Israel) IAI Westwind/Seascan	1973		Shahaf (Seagull) שחף
(United States) Lockheed Constellation	1948	1949	
(United States) Lockheed C-130 Hercules	1971	-	Karnaf (Rhinoceros) קרנף
(United States) Lockheed Martin C-130J Super Hercules	2014	-	Shimshon (Samson) שמשון
(United States) Lockheed Hudson	1948	1950	
(United States) Lockheed Lodestar	1948	1949	
(United Kingdom) Miles M.57 Aerovan	1948	1955	
(United Kingdom) Miles Gemini	1948	1950	
(Canada) Noorduyn UC-64A Norseman	1948	1949	
(France) Nord 1203 Norécrin II	1967	?	
(France) Nord 2501 Noratlas	1956	1978	
(Italy) Piaggio P.149	1968	1972	
(Switzerland) Pilatus Turbo Porter	1963	1976	
(United States) Republic RC-3 Seabee	1947	1948	
(Poland) RWD-13	1947	1949	
(Poland) RWD-15	1947	1949	
(France) SOCATA Rallye	1965	1969	
(France) SOCATA Trinidad	1995	2005	Pashosh (Warbler) פשוש
(United States) Taylorcraft Auster AOP 3/5	1947	1949	
(United States) Taylorcraft Plus C	1947	?	

== Fixed wing trainers ==
Designation	Entered Service	Left Service	Hebrew designation
(United Kingdom) Airspeed Oxford/Consul	1949	1961	
(Italy) Alenia Aermacchi M-346 Master	2014	-	Lavi (young lion) לביא
(United Kingdom) Avro Anson	1949	1961	
(United States) Boeing-Stearman PT-17 Kaydet	1948	1967	
de Havilland Canada Chipmunk	1949	1950	
(Netherlands) Fokker Instructor	1949	1954	
(France) Fouga Magister	1960	2010	Tzukit (Monticola) צוקית
(Germany) Grob G 120	2002	-	Snunit (Swallow) סנונית
(United States) Hawker-Beechcraft T-6 Texan II	2009	-	Efroni (Lark) עפרוני
(United States) North American T-6 Texan	1948	1974	
(United States) Piper Super Cub	1948	2002	
(United States) Temco Buckaroo	1949	1952	
(United States) Vultee BT-13 Valiant	1948	1949	

== Rotary wing - helicopters ==
Designation	Entered Service	Left Service	Hebrew designation
(France) Aérospatiale Alouette II	1957	1975	
(France) Aérospatiale SA 321 Super Frelon	1966	1991	Tzir'a (Hornet) צרעה
(France) Eurocopter HH-65 Dolphin	1985	1997	Dolphin דולפין
(France) Eurocopter Panther	1996	2025	Atalef (Bat) עטלף
(United States) Bell UH-1 Iroquois	1967	2002	
(United States) Bell 206	1978	-	Saifan (Gladiolus) סייפן
(United States) Bell 212	1978	?	Anafa (Heron) אנפה
(United States) Bell AH-1 Cobra	1975	2013	Tzefa (Viper) צפע
(United States) Bell 47	1965	1974	
(United States) Hiller 360	1951	1961	
(United States) Hughes 500	1979	2001	Lahatut (Trick) להטוט
(United States) McDonnell Douglas AH-64A Apache	1990	-	Peten (Adder) פתן
(United States) McDonnell Douglas AH-64D Apache Longbow	2004	-	Saraph (Seraph) שרף
(United States) Sikorsky S-55	1957	1966	
(United States) Sikorsky S-58	1958	1975	
(United States) Sikorsky CH-53	1969	-	Yas'ur (Petrel) יסעור
(United States) Sikorsky UH-60 Black Hawk	1994	-	Yanshuf (Owl) ינשוף

== Unmanned aerial vehicles ==
Designation	Entered Service	Left Service	Hebrew designation
(United States) Ryan BQM-34A Firebee	1971		Mabat (Gaze) מבט
(United States) Ryan BQM-34E/F Firebee II	1971		Shadmit (Pratincole) שדמית
(United States) Northrop Chukar	1971		Telem (Furrow) תלם
(Israel) Tadiran Mastiff	1979	1992	Sayar (scout) סייר
(Israel) IAI Scout	1979	1992	Zahavan (Oriolus) זהבן
(Israel) IAI Harpy	1990s	-	Sion שיאון
(Israel) IAI Searcher 1	1992	?	Hogla (Alectoris) חוגלה
(Israel) IAI Searcher 2	1998	?	Kokhav Lavan (White Star) כוכב לבן
(Israel) Elbit Hermes 450	2001	-	Zik זיק
(Israel) Aeronautics Aerostar	2002	-	Shalev שליו
(Israel) IAI Heron	2005	-	Shoval (Wake) שובל
(Israel) IAI Eitan	2010	-	
(Israel) Elbit Hermes 900	2014	-	Kokhav Plada (Steel Star) כוכב פלדה

== Bibliography ==
- Wisker Thomas J. "Talkback". Air Enthusiast, No. 10, July–September 1979, p. 79. ISSN 0143-5450
