= No. 11 Flight SLAF =

No. 11 UAV Squadron
- Active: 1996-present
- Branch: Sri Lanka Air Force
- Role: Reconnaissance
- Equipment: RQ-2 Pioneer, IAI Scout, IAI Searcher, Searcher MKII
- Engagements: Sri Lankan Civil War

No. 11 UAV Flight Squadron of the Sri Lanka Air Force is an independent flight operating in the reconnaissance role using unmanned aerial vehicles. The squadron was reformed into No. 111 and No. 112 on 1 June 2008.

== Aircraft operated ==
- RQ-2 Pioneer
- IAI Scout
- IAI Searcher
- Searcher MKII
