= Aerospace =

Term used to collectively refer to the atmosphere and outer space

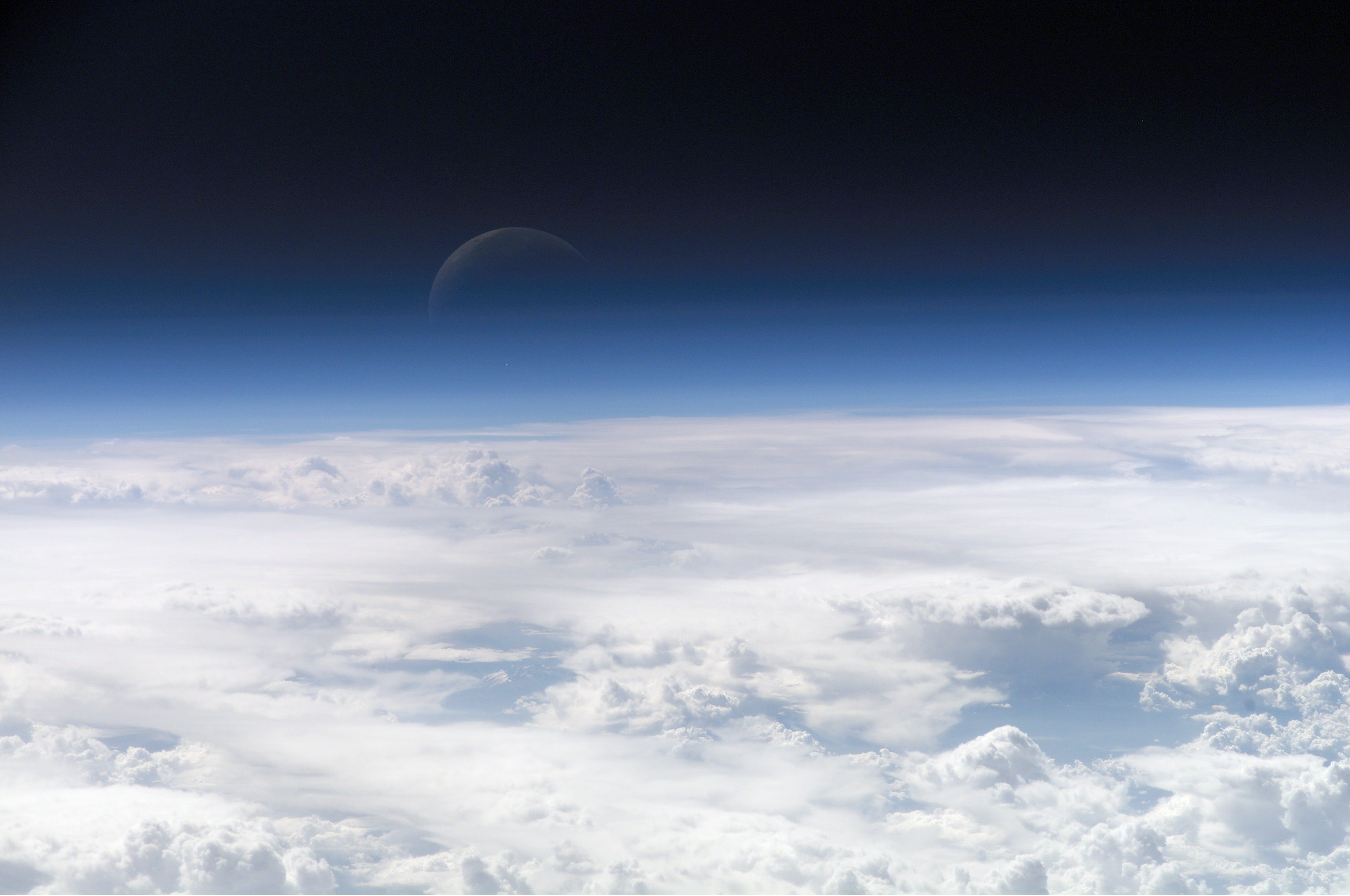
A view of the Earth's atmosphere with the Moon beyond

Aerospace refers to the technology and industry involved with the atmosphere and outer space collectively. Aerospace activity is very diverse, with a multitude of commercial, industrial, and military applications. Aerospace engineering consists of aeronautics and astronautics. Aerospace organizations research, design, manufacture, operate, maintain, and repair both aircraft and spacecraft.

The border between space and the atmosphere has been proposed as 100 kilometres (62.1 mi) above the ground according to the physical explanation that the air density is too low for a lifting body to generate meaningful lift force without exceeding orbital velocity. This border has been called the Kármán line.

== Overview ==
In most industrial countries, the aerospace industry is a co-operation of the public and private sectors. For example, several states have a civilian space program funded by the government, such as National Aeronautics and Space Administration in the United States, European Space Agency in Europe, the Canadian Space Agency in Canada, Indian Space Research Organisation in India, Japan Aerospace Exploration Agency in Japan, Roscosmos State Corporation for Space Activities in Russia, China National Space Administration in China, SUPARCO in Pakistan, Iranian Space Agency in Iran, and Korea Aerospace Research Institute in South Korea.

Along with these public space programs, many companies produce technical tools and components such as spacecraft and satellites. Some known companies involved in space programs include Boeing, Cobham, Airbus, SpaceX, Lockheed Martin, RTX Corporation, MDA and Northrop Grumman. These companies are also involved in other areas of aerospace, such as the construction of aircraft.

== History ==
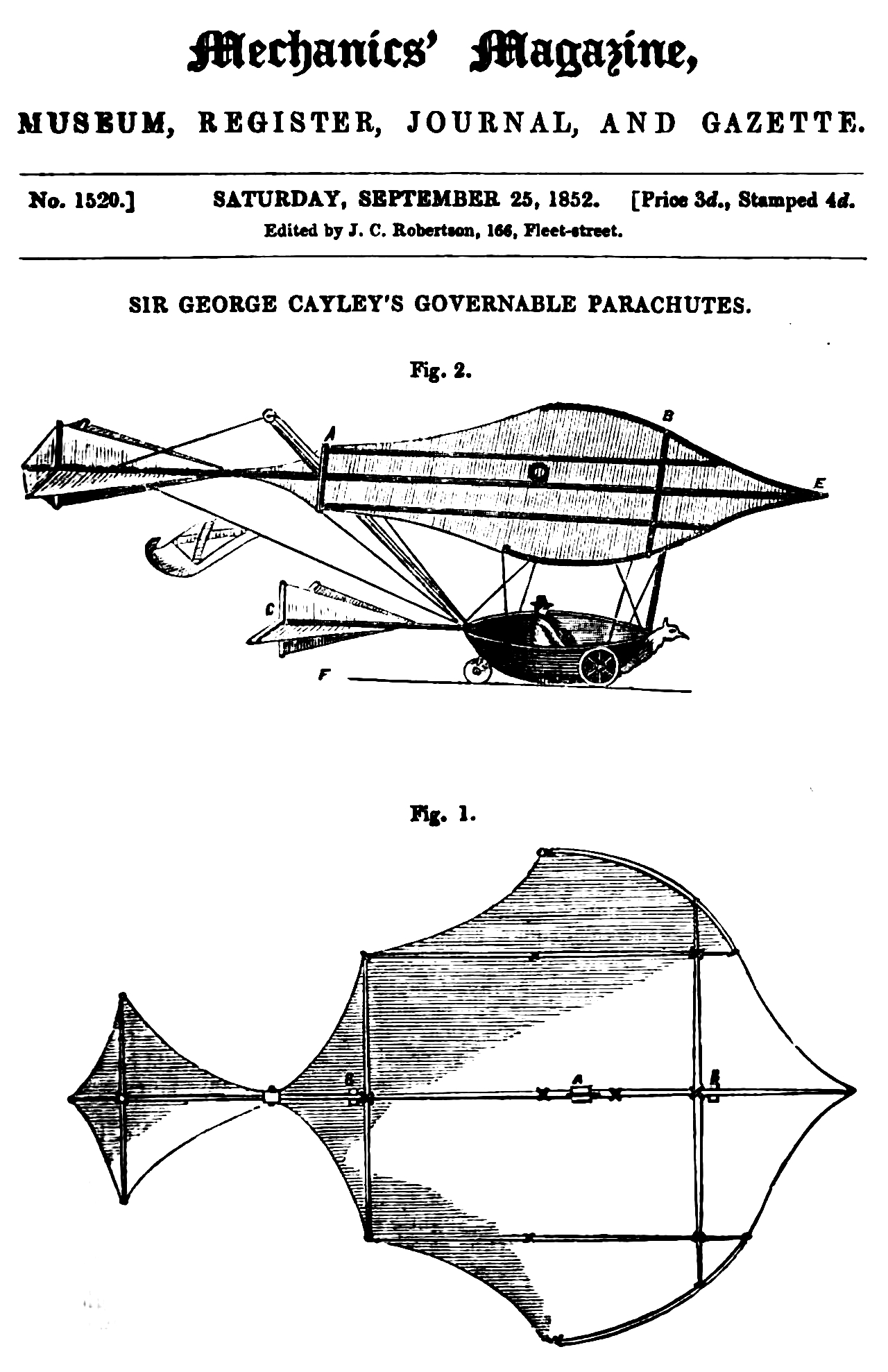
Glider proposed by Cayley in an 1852 magazine.

Modern aerospace began with Engineer George Cayley in 1799. Cayley proposed an aircraft with a "fixed wing and a horizontal and vertical tail", defining characteristics of the modern aeroplane.

The 19th century saw the creation of the Aeronautical Society of Great Britain (1866), the American Rocketry Society, and the Institute of Aeronautical Sciences, all of which made aeronautics a more serious scientific discipline. Airmen like Otto Lilienthal, who introduced cambered airfoils in 1891, used gliders to analyze aerodynamic forces. The Wright brothers were interested in Lilienthal's work and read several of his publications. They also found inspiration in Octave Chanute, an airman and the author of Progress in Flying Machines (1894). It was the preliminary work of Cayley, Lilienthal, Chanute, and other early aerospace engineers that brought about the first powered sustained flight at Kitty Hawk, North Carolina on December 17, 1903, by the Wright brothers.

War and science fiction inspired scientists and engineers like Konstantin Tsiolkovsky and Wernher von Braun to achieve flight beyond the atmosphere. World War II inspired Wernher von Braun to create the V1 and V2 rockets.

The launch of Sputnik 1 in October 1957 started the Space Age, and on July 20, 1969 Apollo 11 achieved the first crewed Moon landing. In April 1981, the Space Shuttle Columbia launched, the start of regular crewed access to orbital space. A sustained human presence in orbital space started with "Mir" in 1986 and is continued by the "International Space Station". Space commercialization and space tourism are more recent features of aerospace.

== Manufacturing ==
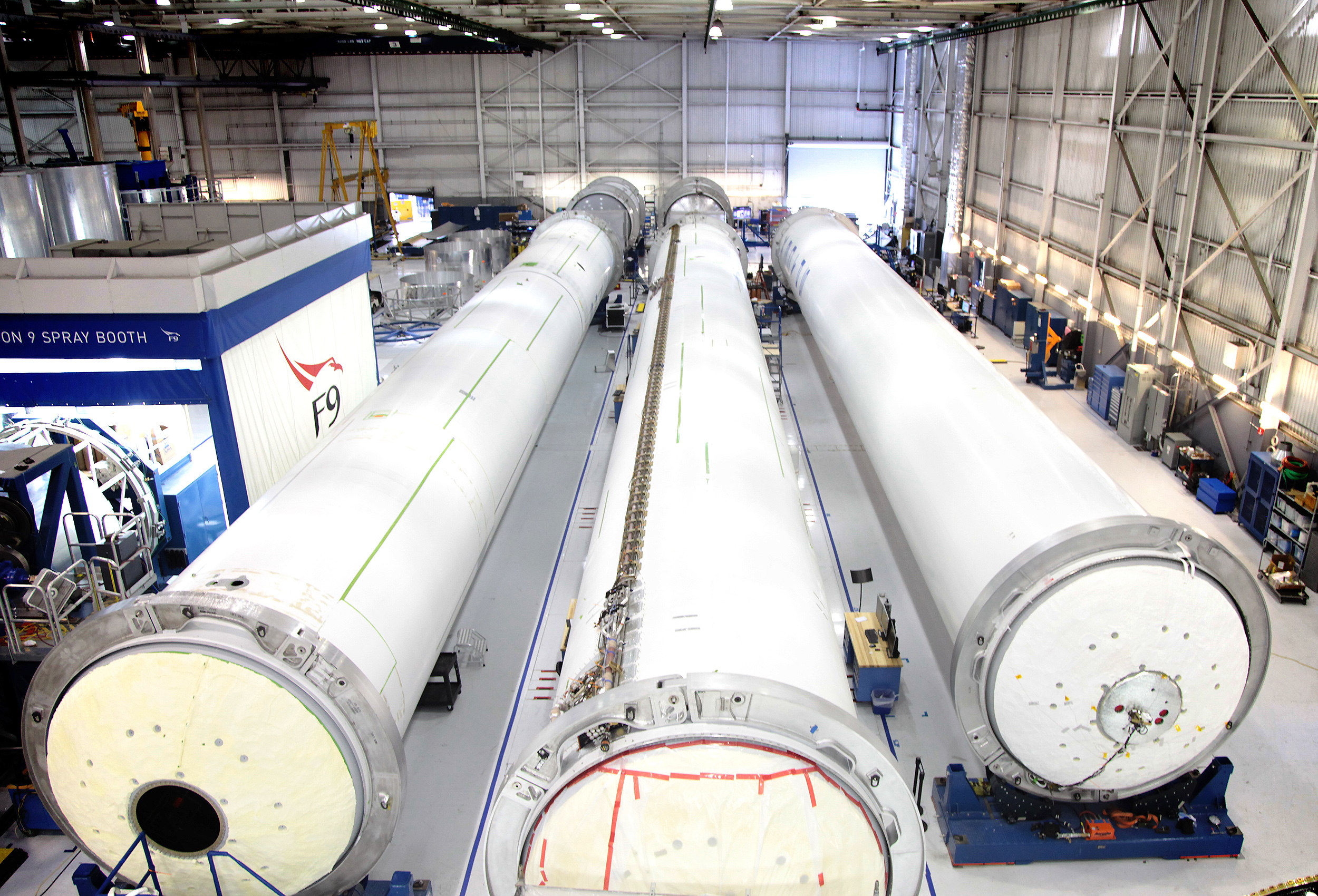
Rocket cores under construction at a SpaceX facility.

Aerospace manufacturing is a high-technology industry that produces "aircraft, guided missiles, space vehicles, aircraft engines, propulsion units, and related parts". Most of the industry is geared toward governmental work. For each original equipment manufacturer (OEM), the US government has assigned a Commercial and Government Entity (CAGE) code. These codes help to identify each manufacturer, repair facilities, and other critical aftermarket vendors in the aerospace industry.

In the United States, the Department of Defense and the National Aeronautics and Space Administration (NASA) are the two largest consumers of aerospace technology and products. Others include the very large airline industry. The aerospace industry employed 472,000 wage and salary workers in 2006. Most of those jobs were in Washington state and in California, with Missouri, New York and Texas also being important. The leading aerospace manufacturers in the U.S. are Boeing, United Technologies Corporation, SpaceX, Northrop Grumman and Lockheed Martin. As talented American employees age and retire, these manufacturers face an expanding labor shortfall. In order to supply the industrial sector with fresh workers, apprenticeship programs like the Aerospace Joint Apprenticeship Council (AJAC) collaborate with community colleges and aerospace firms in Washington state.

Important locations of the civilian aerospace industry worldwide include Washington state (Boeing), California (Boeing, Lockheed Martin, etc.) and Montreal, Quebec, Canada (Bombardier, Pratt & Whitney Canada) in North America; Toulouse, France (Airbus) and Hamburg, Germany (Airbus) in Europe; as well as São José dos Campos, Brazil (Embraer), Querétaro, Mexico (Bombardier Aerospace, General Electric Aviation) and Mexicali, Mexico (United Technologies Corporation, Gulfstream Aerospace) in Latin America.

In the European Union, aerospace companies such as Airbus, Safran, Thales, Dassault Aviation, Leonardo and Saab AB account for a large share of the global aerospace industry and research effort, with the European Space Agency as one of the largest consumers of aerospace technology and products.

In India, Bangalore is a major center of the aerospace industry, where Hindustan Aeronautics Limited, the National Aerospace Laboratories and the Indian Space Research Organisation are headquartered. The Indian Space Research Organisation (ISRO) launched India's first Moon orbiter, Chandrayaan-1, in October 2008.

In Russia, large aerospace companies like Oboronprom and the United Aircraft Building Corporation (encompassing Mikoyan, Sukhoi, Ilyushin, Tupolev, Yakovlev, and Irkut, which includes Beriev) are among the major global players in this industry. The historic Soviet Union was also the home of a major aerospace industry.

The United Kingdom attempted to maintain its own large aerospace industry, making its own airliners and warplanes, but it has largely turned to cooperative efforts with continental companies. It also imports from countries such as the United States. However, major companies such as BAE Systems supply fully assembled aircraft, aircraft components, sub-assemblies, and sub-systems to other manufacturers in Europe and elsewhere.

Canada formerly manufactured some of its own designs for jet warplanes, etc. (e.g. the CF-100 fighter), but it has come to rely on imports from the United States and Europe to fill these needs. However, Canada still manufactures some military aircraft. Also notable is the late 1950s development of the Avro Canada CF-105 Arrow, a supersonic fighter-interceptor whose 1959 cancellation was controversial.

France has continued to make its own warplanes for its air force and navy, and Sweden continues to make its own warplanes for the Swedish Air Force—especially in support of its position as a neutral country. (See Saab AB.) Other European countries either team up in making fighters (such as the Panavia Tornado and the Eurofighter Typhoon), or else to import them from the United States.

Pakistan has a developing aerospace engineering industry. The National Engineering and Scientific Commission, Khan Research Laboratories and Pakistan Aeronautical Complex are among the premier organizations involved in research and development in this sector. Pakistan has the capability of designing and manufacturing guided rockets, missiles and space vehicles. The city of Kamra is home to the Pakistan Aeronautical Complex which contains several factories. This facility is responsible for manufacturing the MFI-17, MFI-395, K-8 and JF-17 Thunder aircraft. Pakistan also has the capability to design and manufacture both armed and unarmed unmanned aerial vehicles.

In the People's Republic of China, Beijing, Xi'an, Chengdu, Shanghai, Shenyang and Nanchang are major research and manufacture centers of the aerospace industry. China has developed an extensive capability to design, test and produce military aircraft, missiles and space vehicles. Despite the cancellation in 1983 of the experimental Shanghai Y-10, China is still developing its civil aerospace industry.

The aircraft parts industry was born out of the sale of second-hand or used aircraft parts from the aerospace manufacture sector. Within the United States there is a specific process that parts brokers or resellers must follow. This includes leveraging a certified repair station to overhaul and "tag" a part. This certification guarantees that a part was repaired or overhauled to meet OEM specifications. Once a part is overhauled its value is determined from the supply and demand of the aerospace market. When an airline has an aircraft on the ground, the part that the airline requires to get the plane back into service becomes invaluable. This can drive the market for specific parts. There are several online marketplaces that assist with the commodity selling of aircraft parts.

In the aerospace and defense industry, much consolidation occurred at the end of the 20th century and in the early 21st century. Between 1988 and 2011, more than 6,068 mergers and acquisitions with a total known value of US$678 billion were announced worldwide. The largest transactions have been:

- Acquisition of Rockwell Collins by United Technologies Corporation for US$30.0 billion in 2018
- Acquisition of Goodrich Corporation by United Technologies Corporation for US$16.2 billion in 2011
- Merger of Allied Signal with Honeywell in a stock swap valued at US$15.6 billion in 1999
- Merger of Boeing with McDonnell valued at US$13.4 billion in 1996
- Acquisition of Marconi Electronic Systems, a subsidiary of GEC, by British Aerospace for US$12.9 billion in 1999 (now called: BAE Systems)
- Acquisition of Hughes Aircraft by Raytheon for US$9.5 billion in 1997

== Technology ==
Multiple technologies and innovations are used in aerospace, many of them pioneered around World War II:

- patented by Short Brothers, folding wings optimise aircraft carrier storage from a simple fold to the entire rotating wing of the V-22, and the 12 ft (3.7 m) wingtip fold of the Boeing 777X for airport compatibility.
- To improve low-speed performance, a de Havilland DH4 was modified by Handley Page to a monoplane with high-lift devices: full-span leading-edge slats and trailing-edge flaps; in 1924, Fowler flaps that extend backward and downward were invented in the US, and used on the Lockheed Model 10 Electra while in 1943 forward-hinged leading-edge Krueger flaps were invented in Germany and later used on the Boeing 707.
- The 1927 large Propeller Research Tunnel at NACA Langley confirmed that the landing gear was a major source of drag, in 1930 the Boeing Monomail featured a retractable gear.
- The flush rivet displaced the domed rivet in the 1930s and pneumatic rivet guns work in combination with a heavy reaction bucking bar; not depending on plastic deformation, specialist rivets were developed to improve fatigue life as shear fasteners like the Hi-Lok, threaded pins tightened until a collar breaks off with enough torque.
- First flown in 1935, the Queen Bee was a radio-controlled target drone derived from the Tiger Moth for Flak training; the Ryan Firebee was a jet-powered target drone developed into long-range reconnaissance UAVs: the Ryan Model 147 Fire Fly and Lightning Bug; the Israeli IAI Scout and Tadiran Mastiff launched a line of battlefield UAVs including the IAI Searcher; developed from the General Atomics Gnat long-endurance UAV for the CIA, the MQ-1 Predator led to the armed MQ-9 Reaper.
- At the end of World War I, piston engine power could be boosted by compressing intake air with a compressor, also compensating for decreasing air density with altitude, improved with 1930s turbochargers for the Boeing B-17 and the first pressurized airliners.
- The 1937 Hindenburg disaster ended the era of passenger airships but the US Navy used airships for anti-submarine warfare and airborne early warning into the 1960s, while small airships continue to be used for aerial advertising, sightseeing flights, surveillance and research, and the Airlander 10 or the Lockheed Martin LMH-1 continue to be developed.
- As US airlines were interested in high-altitude flying in the mid-1930s, the Lockheed XC-35 with a pressurized cabin was tested in 1937 and the Boeing 307 Stratoliner would be the first pressurized airliner to enter commercial service.
- In 1933, Plexiglas, a transparent Acrylic plastic, was introduced in Germany and shortly before World War II, was first used for aircraft windshields as it is lighter than glass, and the bubble canopy improved fighter pilots' visibility.
- In January 1930, Royal Air Force pilot and engineer Frank Whittle filed a patent for a gas turbine aircraft engine with an inlet, compressor, combustor, turbine and nozzle, while an independent turbojet was developed by researcher Hans von Ohain in Germany; both engines ran within weeks in early 1937 and the Heinkel HeS 3-propelled Heinkel He 178 experimental aircraft made its first flight on Aug 27, 1939 while the Whittle W.1-powered Gloster E.28/39 prototype flew on May 15, 1941.
- In 1935, Britain demonstrated aircraft radio detection and ranging and in 1940 the RAF introduced the first VHF airborne radars on Bristol Blenheims, then higher-resolution microwave-frequency radar with a cavity magnetron on Bristol Beaufighters in 1941, and in 1959 the radar-homing Hughes AIM-4 Falcon became the first US guided missile on the Convair F-106.
- In the early 1940s, British Hurricane and Spitfire pilots wore g-suits to prevent G-LOC due to blood pooling in the lower body in high g situations; Mayo Clinic researchers developed air-filled bladders to replace water-filled bladders and in 1943 the US military began using pressure suits from the David Clark Company.
- The modern ejection seat was developed during World War II, a seat on rails ejected by rockets before deploying a parachute, which could have been enhanced by the USAF in the late 1960s as a turbojet-powered autogyro with 50 nm of range, the Kaman KSA-100 SAVER.
- In 1942, numerical control machining was conceived by machinist John T. Parsons to cut complex structures from solid blocks of alloy, rather than assembling them, improving quality, reducing weight, and saving time and cost to produce bulkheads or wing skins.
- In World War II, the German V-2 combined gyroscopes, an accelerometer and a primitive computer for real-time inertial navigation allowing dead reckoning without reference to landmarks or guide stars, leading to packaged IMUs for spacecraft and aircraft.
- The UK Miles M.52 supersonic aircraft was to have an afterburner, augmenting a turbojet thrust by burning additional fuel in the nozzle, but was cancelled in 1946.
- In 1935, German aerodynamicist Adolf Busemann proposed using swept wings to reduce high-speed drag and the Messerschmitt P.1101 fighter prototype was 80% complete by the end of World War II; the later US North American F-86 and Boeing B-47 flew in 1947, as the Soviet MiG-15, and the British de Havilland Comet in 1949.
- In 1951, the Avro Jetliner featured an ice protection system from Goodyear through electro-thermal resistances in the wing and tail leading edges; jet aircraft use hot engine bleed air and lighter aircraft use pneumatic deicing boots or weep anti-icing fluid on propellers, wing and tail leading edges.
- In 1954, Bell Labs developed the first transistorized airborne digital computer, Tradic for the US Boeing B-52 and in the 1960s Raytheon built the MIT-developed Apollo Guidance Computer; the MIL-STD-1553 avionics digital bus was defined in 1973 then first used in the General Dynamics F-16, while the civil ARINC 429 was first used in the Boeing 757/B767 and Airbus A310 in the early 1980s.
- After World War II, the initial promoter of Photovoltaic power for spacecraft, Hans K. Ziegler, was brought to the US under Operation Paperclip along Wernher von Braun and Vanguard 1 was its first application in 1958, later enhanced in space-deployable structures like the International Space Station solar arrays of 0.33 hectares (0.82 acres).
- To board an airliner, jet bridges are more accessible, comfortable and efficient than climbing the stairs.
- In the 1950s, to improve thrust and fuel efficiency, the jet engine airflow was divided into a core stream and a bypass stream with a lower velocity for better propulsive efficiency: the first was the Rolls-Royce Conway with a 0.3 BPR on the Boeing 707 in 1960, followed by the Pratt & Whitney JT3D with a 1.5 BPR and, derived from the J79, the General Electric CJ805 powered the Convair 990 with a 28% lower cruise fuel burn; bypass ratio improved to the 9.3 BPR Rolls-Royce Trent XWB, the 10:1 BPR GE9X and the Pratt & Whitney GTF with high-pressure ratio cores.
- During the 1940s, modern honing techniques were further developed and refined in response to the rapid industrial expansion brought about by World War II. The conflict created an unprecedented demand for aircraft engines, hydraulic systems, and precision metal components that required extremely accurate surface finishes. As a result, honing technology evolved to deliver higher dimensional accuracy and smoother finishes on critical aerospace and defense parts. These advancements not only met the wartime need for reliability and mass production but also laid the foundation for post-war innovations in the aerospace and precision engineering industries.

== Functional safety ==
Functional safety relates to a part of the general safety of a system or a piece of equipment. It implies that the system or equipment can be operated properly and without causing any danger, risk, damage or injury.

Functional safety is crucial in the aerospace industry, which allows no compromises or negligence. In this respect, supervisory bodies, such as the European Aviation Safety Agency, regulate the aerospace market with strict certification standards. This is meant to reach and ensure the highest possible level of safety. The standards AS 9100 in America, EN 9100 on the European market or JISQ 9100 in Asia particularly address the aerospace and aviation industry. These are standards applying to the functional safety of aerospace vehicles. Some companies are therefore specialized in the certification, inspection, verification and testing of the vehicles and spare parts to ensure and attest compliance with the appropriate regulations.

Modern aerospace manufacturing and lifecycle operations across multi-vendor networks increasingly rely on federated digital thread architectures to maintain end-to-end data traceability. Because major original equipment manufacturers (OEMs), defense departments, and certified aftermarket repair facilities operate on disparate software platforms, a federated approach links design specifications, Commercial and Government Entity (CAGE) code vendor data, and maintenance records via open standards without requiring full data centralization or exposing proprietary intellectual property. This continuous data flow supports functional safety and quality compliance standards, such as AS9100, throughout an asset's operational lifespan.

== Spinoffs ==
Spinoffs refer to any technology that is a direct result of coding or products created by NASA and redesigned for an alternate purpose. These technological advancements are one of the primary results of the aerospace industry, with $5.2 billion worth of revenue generated by spinoff technology, including computers and cellular devices. These spinoffs have applications in a variety of different fields including medicine, transportation, energy, consumer goods, public safety and more. NASA publishes an annual report called "Spinoffs", regarding many of the specific products and benefits to the aforementioned areas in an effort to highlight some of the ways funding is put to use. For example, in the most recent edition of this publication, "Spinoffs 2015", endoscopes are featured as one of the medical derivations of aerospace achievement. This device enables more precise and subsequently cost-effective neurosurgery by reducing complications through a minimally invasive procedure that abbreviates hospitalization. "These NASA technologies are not only giving companies and entrepreneurs a competitive edge in their own industries, but are also helping to shape budding industries, such as commercial lunar landers," said Daniel Lockney.

== See also ==
- Aerodynamics – Branch of dynamics concerned with studying the motion of air
- NewSpace – Spaceflight not by a government
- Space agencies (List of)
- Space exploration – Investigation of outer space
- Wiktionary: Aviation, aerospace, and aeronautical terms
