= Elbit Hermes 900 =

Israeli military drone, 2009

Hermes 900
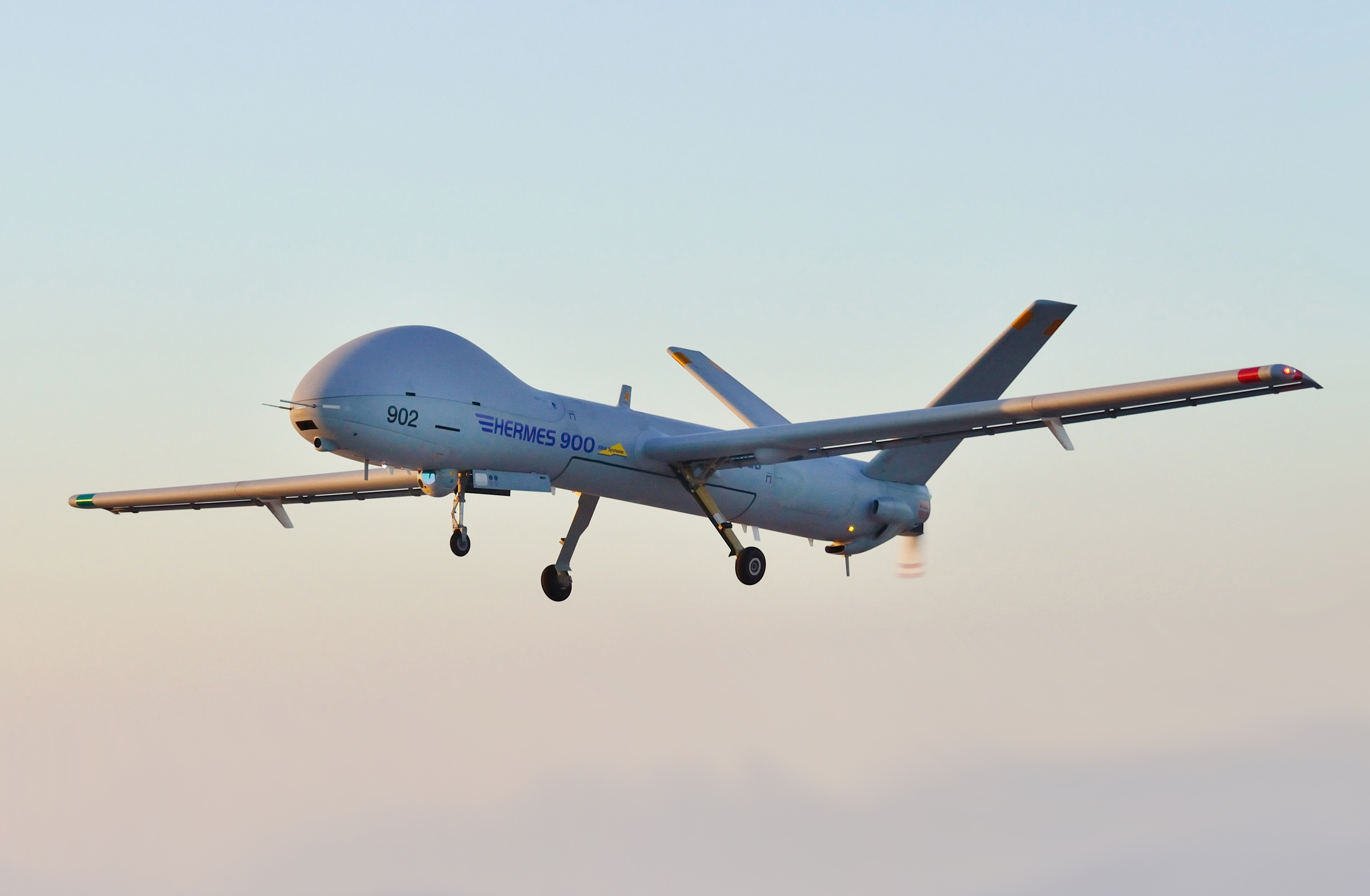
- Elbit Hermes 900 takeoff

General information
- Type: Unmanned surveillance and reconnaissance aerial vehicle
- National origin: Israel
- Manufacturer: Elbit Systems; Adani-Elbit Advanced Systems
- Status: In service
- Primary users: Israeli Air Force Philippine Air Force; Swiss Air Force

History
- Introduction date: May 2010
- First flight: December 9, 2009
- Developed from: Elbit Hermes 450

The Elbit Systems Hermes 900 Kochav ("Star") is an Israeli medium-size, multi-payload, medium-altitude long-endurance unmanned aerial vehicle (UAV) designed for tactical missions. It is a successor to the Hermes 450 series of drones, one of the most widely used military drones in the world.

It has an endurance of over 30 hours and can fly at a maximum altitude of 30,000 feet (9,100 m), with a primary mission of reconnaissance, surveillance and communications relay. The Hermes 900 has a wingspan of 15 m (49 ft) and weighs 970 kg (2,140 lb), with a payload capability of 300 kg (660 lb). Payload options include electro-optical/infrared sensors, synthetic-aperture radar/ground-moving target indication, communications and electronic intelligence, electronic warfare, and hyperspectral sensors.

== Operational history ==
=== Israel ===
The Hermes 900 was first used by Israel during Operation Protective Edge in July 2014. It had been undergoing test flights and wasn't planned for operational deployment until late 2015, but it was introduced during the operation for unique missions that it could perform better than the Hermes 450. A few days after receiving orders to deploy the aircraft, one Kochav was readied for "temporary activity." The Hermes 900's first operational mission took place on July 15, 2014 during Israel's war in Gaza, in which a chain of operations and jet attacks destroyed Palestinian infrastructure. Maintenance on the aircraft during the operation was done by Elbit personnel because IAF ground teams had not yet been qualified to perform maintenance on it, and mission stations had Elbit representatives that guided the operators during combat flights. Following the end of the operation, the Hermes 900 returned to integration and flight testing to pass milestones that still needed to be met. The Hermes 900 was officially introduced into the IAF's operational lineup on 11 November 2015.

On 6 April 2024, amid border tension during the Gaza war Hezbollah shot down a Hermes 900 with a surface-to-air missile in the south of Lebanon. Another was shot down on 1 June 2024. Another unit was lost on 29 October 2024, when Hezbollah shot down a Hermes 900 on Marjayoun.

During the Twelve-Day War, on 18 June 2025, a Hermes 900 serial 997, was shot down by a surface-to-air missile in Isfahan, central Iran. Another two were shot down on 23 June 2025, one in Khorramabad area, western Iran, with Israeli officials acknowledged the loss. And another was shot down in Arak, Markazi Province Iran. Iranian media showed wreckage of the drone with the serial 939.

=== Azerbaijan ===
Azerbaijani media first mentioned the procurement of the Hermes 900 in August 2017, reporting up to 15 units having been purchased. In May 2018, the Azerbaijani government confirmed the purchase, releasing photos of Azerbaijani President Ilham Aliyev inspecting one of the drones.

During the 2020 Armenian-Azerbaijani skirmishes, Armenia's Defense Ministry spokesperson Shushan Stepanyan reported that Armenian forces had shot down an Azerbaijani Hermes 900 drone, sharing the video of the alleged shoot down on social media. The Azerbaijani side denied losing any of its drones.

=== Brazil ===
During the 2024 Rio Grande do Sul floods, the Brazilian Air Force used Hermes 900 drones to help locate flood victims that required rescue. A drone located 36 flood victims between 5–6 May, enabling their rescue by lasing their positions to SAR helicopters. One drone crashed due to a "technical problem", pending investigation by CENIPA. A replacement Hermes 900 was bought in September 2024.

=== India ===
On 14 January 2025, a Drishti-10 Starliner drone manufactured by Adani Defence & Aerospace crashed off the Gujarat coast near Porbandar. It was the second drone that had been delivered to the Indian Navy on 4 December 2024 and was undergoing pre-acceptance trials before induction by the original equipment manufacturer. The drone, worth ₹140 crore (equivalent to ₹145 crore or US$15 million in 2026), was not a financial loss for the Navy as it had not been inducted yet. The drone was ditched into water while conducting an emergency landing. The airframe has been recovered and investigation is underway.

In February 2025, it was reported that the crashed drone would be replaced by the manufacturer within 6 months. During the trials the drone faced frequent SATCOM deconnection which could be a reason for the crash. This malfunction also disables some of the stated capability of the UAV. The Drone delivered to the Army also faced technical problems and is currently grounded.

Reports in January 2026 indicated that the Indian Navy intends to induct 10 Starliner drones. The first and only active drone was already flying Intelligence, Surveillance and Reconnaissance (ISR) missions. The drones will support anti-submarine warfare, over-the-horizon targeting as well as search and rescue missions, reducing dependence on manned maritime patrol aircraft.

== Operators ==
Current operators

- Azerbaijan

Two Hermes 900s were delivered in 2017. In May 2018, Azerbaijani President Ilham Aliyev visited a military base to inspect military equipment, released photos from the visit included one Hermes 900.

- Brazil

Elbit Systems has been awarded a contract to supply a Hermes 900 unmanned air system to the Brazilian air force. In December 2021, the Brazilian Air Force acquires two more remotely piloted Hermes 900 aircraft.

- Canada

The Government of Canada awarded a contract to Elbit Systems for one unarmed Hermes 900 StarLiner in 2022, initially to bolster Transport Canada's National Aerial Surveillance Program in the Arctic. Ownership shifted to the Canadian Coast Guard, which was rolled into the Department of National Defence in 2025. The UAS will fill gaps left by satellites and manned aircraft in support of maritime surveillance, oil spills, ice mapping, shipping monitoring, search and rescue, and environmental protection.
The eventual plan for Arctic defence involves MQ-9B Sky Guardian drones, as well as new fighter aircraft, and new Arctic Offshore Patrol Ships. How the StarLiner will fit into that plan may involve technical and logistical complications that have yet to be addressed.

- Chile

In July 2011, Elbit reported the first export sale of its Hermes 900 UAV to the Chilean Air Force. The Chilean choice followed evaluation of two classes of UAVs. At the high end were the Elbit Hermes 900 and IAI Heron. At the lower (tactical) level were Elbit Hermes 450, and Aerostar from Aeronautics Defense Systems. Three Hermes 900 UAVs are operated by the Chilean Air Force. In October 2013, the Chilean Navy began evaluating the Hermes 900 for procurement for maritime patrol tasks.

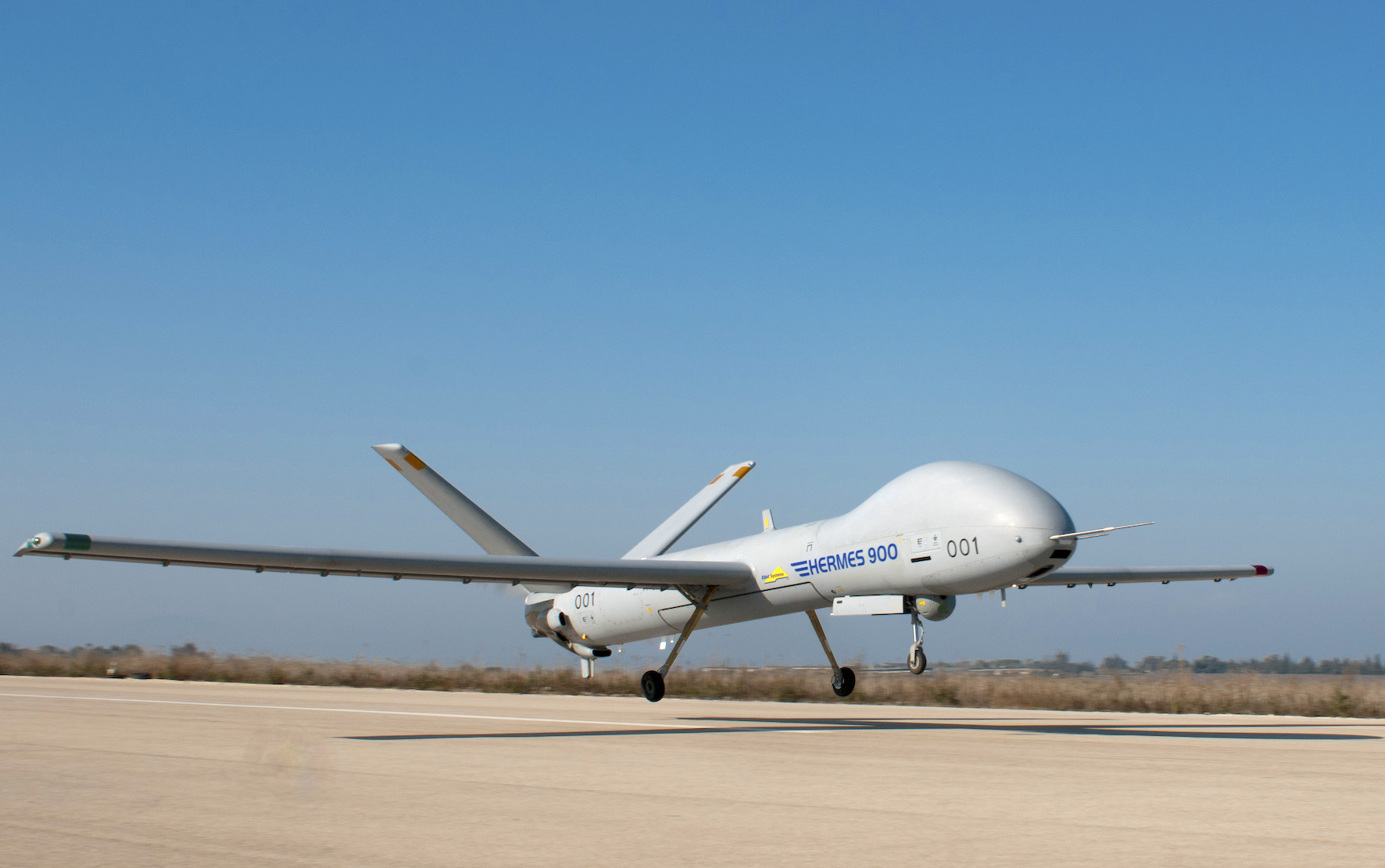
Elbit Hermes 900 UAV

- Colombia

In August 2012, Elbit won a multi-million-dollar contract to supply a mixed fleet of Hermes 900 and Hermes 450 unmanned air systems to Colombia. In July 2013, the Colombian Aerospace Force confirmed they have one Hermes 900 on order, to be accepted in the coming months.

- European Union

In September 2018, the Portuguese company Centro de Engenharia e Desenvolvimento was contracted to the European Maritime Safety Agency to provide long-range, long-endurance maritime surveillance services using the Hermes 900.

- India

Indian variant is to be designated as Drishti 10 Starliner and co-manufactured with Adani Defence & Aerospace. Orders for 4 units placed in March 2023 with 2 each for the Indian Army and the Indian Navy. Two were delivered to Navy on 10 January and 4 December 2024, respectively and were deployed at NAE Porbandar, Gujarat with INAS 343. The Army received their first UAV on 18 June 2024 which is deployed at Bathinda base, Punjab.
On 14 January 2025, the second Navy Hermes 900 crashed near Porbandar, Gujarat during test flight. One drone was operating with the Navy in January 2026 while it plans to induct 10 such drones.

- Iceland

Iceland uses the Hermes 900 UAV to monitor its exclusive economic zone.

- Israel

The Israeli air force has equipped its Elbit Systems Hermes 900 unmanned air vehicles with undisclosed specialist payloads, and formally named the type "Kochav" (Star). The UAV made its first operational flight during "Protective Edge" operation in Gaza in July 2014.

- Mexico

In January 2012, Elbit announced it has been awarded a $50 million contract to supply two Hermes 900 systems to an undisclosed customer "in the Americas", later revealed to be the Mexican Federal Police.

- Philippines

In August 2020, Philippine Air Force received full delivery of three Hermes 900 and one Hermes 450 unmanned aerial systems (UAS) as part of a contract worth approximately $175 million. Each system consists of three unmanned aerial vehicles (UAVs), a ground control system and support equipment. Elbit Systems also included a spare used Hermes 450 UAV as part of the deal, for a total of 9 Hermes 900 UAVs and 4 Hermes 450 UAVs.

- Serbia

First unveiled to the public in September 2025.

- Singapore

In November 2025, the Republic of Singapore Air Force announced that it will progressively take delivery of an undisclosed number of Hermes 900 to replace the in-service Hermes 450, with deliveries beginning in late 2025.

- Switzerland

In 2015, the Swiss procurement authority selected the Hermes 900 as part of its programme to acquire a Medium Altitude Long Endurance (MALE) unmanned aerial system capable of operating in all weather and lighting conditions and providing continuous intelligence surveillance. The main challenge in Switzerland was the combination of a relatively dense population and an extensive civil and private aviation sector, which required an unmanned system able to integrate safely into civilian airspace.

The system was specifically adapted to the requirements of the Swiss Armed Forces and designated as Hermes 900 HFE. It is the first and only MALE UAV worldwide to obtain civil certification for operation in civilian airspace, based on approval from the Civil Aviation Authority of Israel (CAAI), which served as a reference for the Swiss programme. Within the Swiss military it is known as ADS-15. The platform underwent extensive flight testing both in Israel and in Switzerland, and was defined as a mature system ready for delivery to the Swiss Air Force.

The project also involved RUAG, the Swiss state-owned aerospace company, which was contracted directly by armasuisse to develop and integrate a “Detect-and-Avoid” (DAA) collision-avoidance system on the Hermes 900 HFE. The RUAG DAA programme remains in the development stage and has faced delays. The ADS-15 programme included a set of unique requirements for both mission capabilities and flight operations, and the process of meeting the standards for civil certification resulted in schedule delays that postponed the system’s operational use.

- Thailand

The Royal Thai Navy (RTN) signed a contract with Elbit Systems in September 2022 to acquire the Hermes 900 to strengthen maritime surveillance, search and rescue, and reconnaissance capabilities along Thailand's coastline and in territorial waters.

== Specifications ==
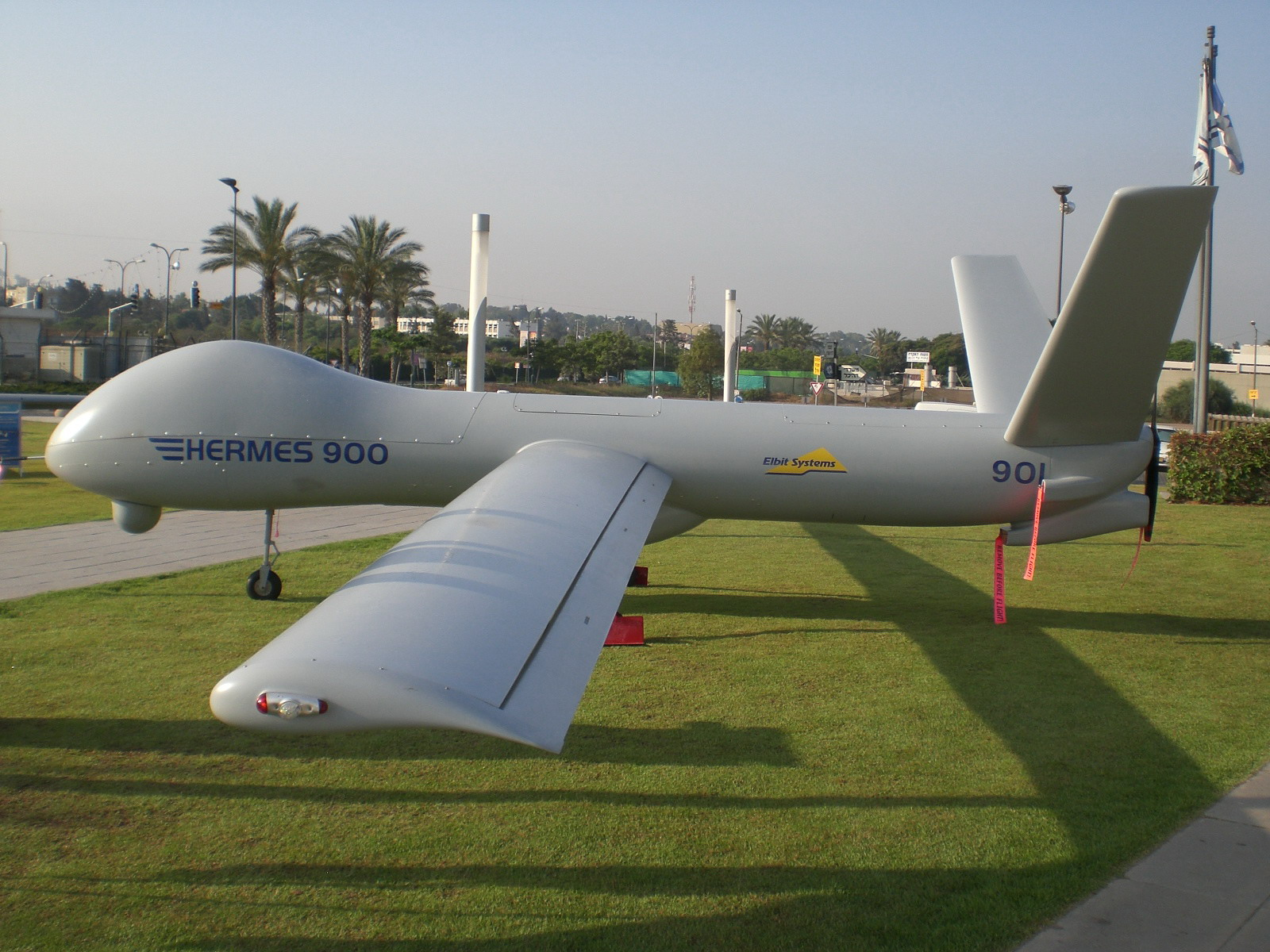
Elbit Hermes 900 UAV

Data from Defense Update Elbit Systems Australia

General characteristics

- Crew: 2 on ground
- Capacity: 350 kg (770 lb) payload
- Length: 8.3 m (27 ft 3 in)
- Wingspan: 15 m (49 ft 3 in)
- Max takeoff weight: 1,180 kg (2,601 lb)
- Powerplant: 1 × Rotax 916, 160 kW (210 hp)

Performance

- Maximum speed: 220 km/h (140 mph, 120 kn)
- Cruise speed: 112 km/h (70 mph, 60 kn)
- Endurance: 36 hours
- Service ceiling: 9,100 m (30,000 ft)
