= AAI RQ-2 Pioneer =

Unmanned United States Military Drone

RQ-2 Pioneer
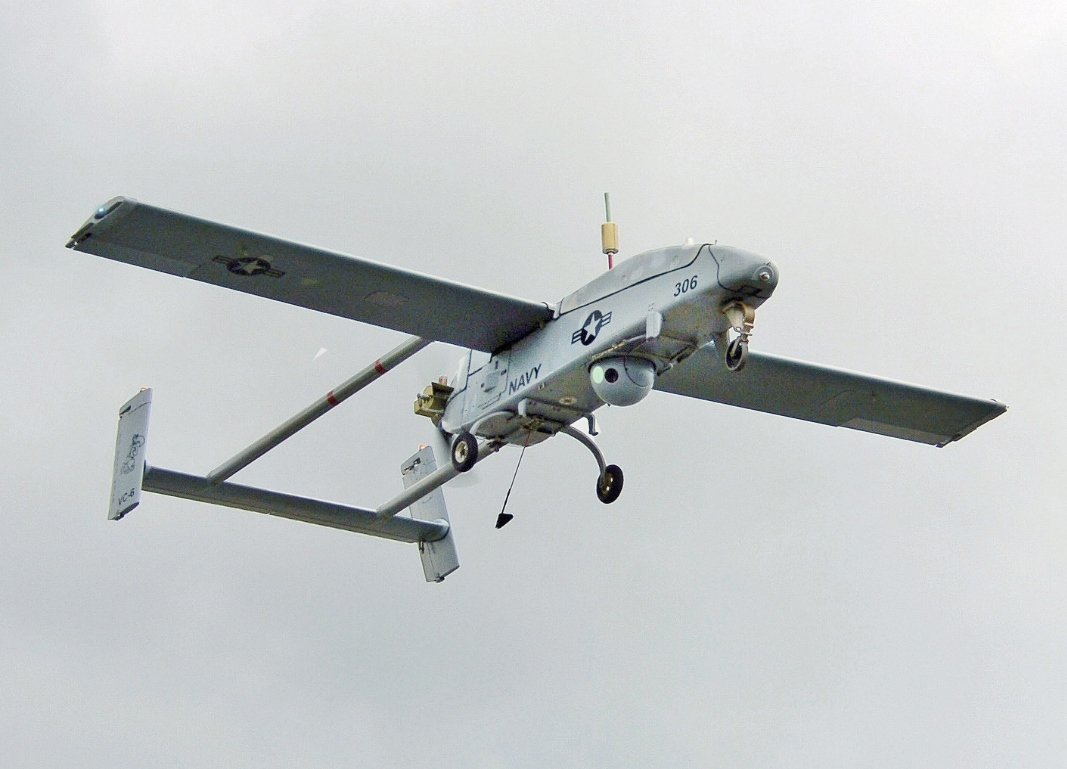
- RQ-2 Pioneer

General information
- Type: Reconnaissance UAV
- National origin: Israel/United States
- Manufacturer: AAI Corporation, Israel Aircraft Industries
- Number built: 175 delivered; 35 in service

History
- Introduction date: 1986
- Retired: 2007
- Developed into: AAI RQ-7 Shadow

The AAI RQ-2 Pioneer is an unmanned aerial vehicle (UAV) that was used by the United States Navy, Marine Corps, and Army, and deployed at sea and on land from 1986 until 2007. Initially tested aboard USS Iowa, the RQ-2 Pioneer was placed aboard Iowa-class battleships to provide gunnery spotting, its mission evolving into reconnaissance and surveillance, primarily for amphibious forces.

It was developed jointly by AAI Corporation and Israel Aircraft Industries. The program grew out of successful testing and field operation of the Tadiran Mastiff UAV by the American and Israeli militaries.

Essentially, the Pioneer is an upgraded IAI Scout which was re-engined to accommodate a greater payload by request of the US Navy. To accomplish this, the original "Limbach" two-cylinder two-stroke engine was replaced with a Fichtel & Sachs two-cylinder two-stroke. The Limbach motor used a 71 cm propeller from Propeller Engineering and Duplicating, Inc. of San Clemente, California. The newer, more powerful Fichtel & Sachs motor was outfitted with a 74 cm propeller (which spins in the opposite direction) from the Sensenich Propeller Manufacturing Company of Lancaster, Pennsylvania.

== Operation ==
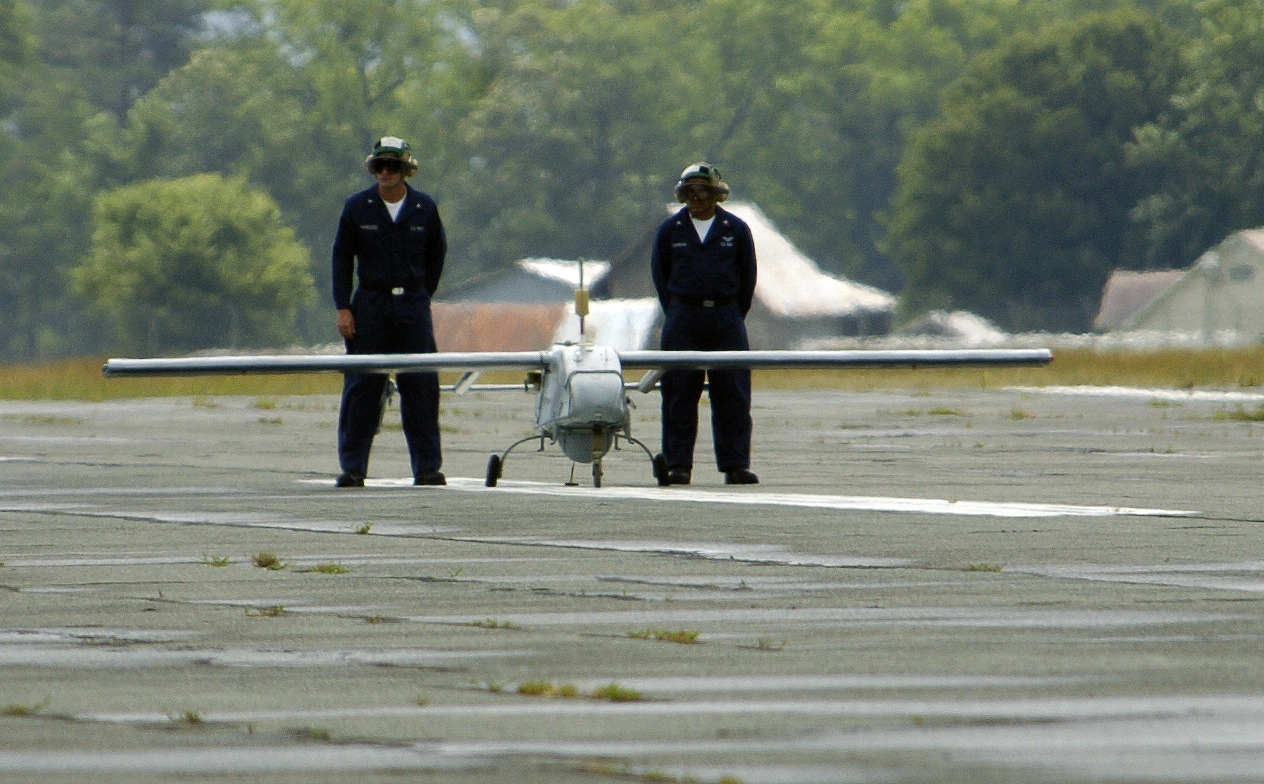
An RQ-2B on the tarmac

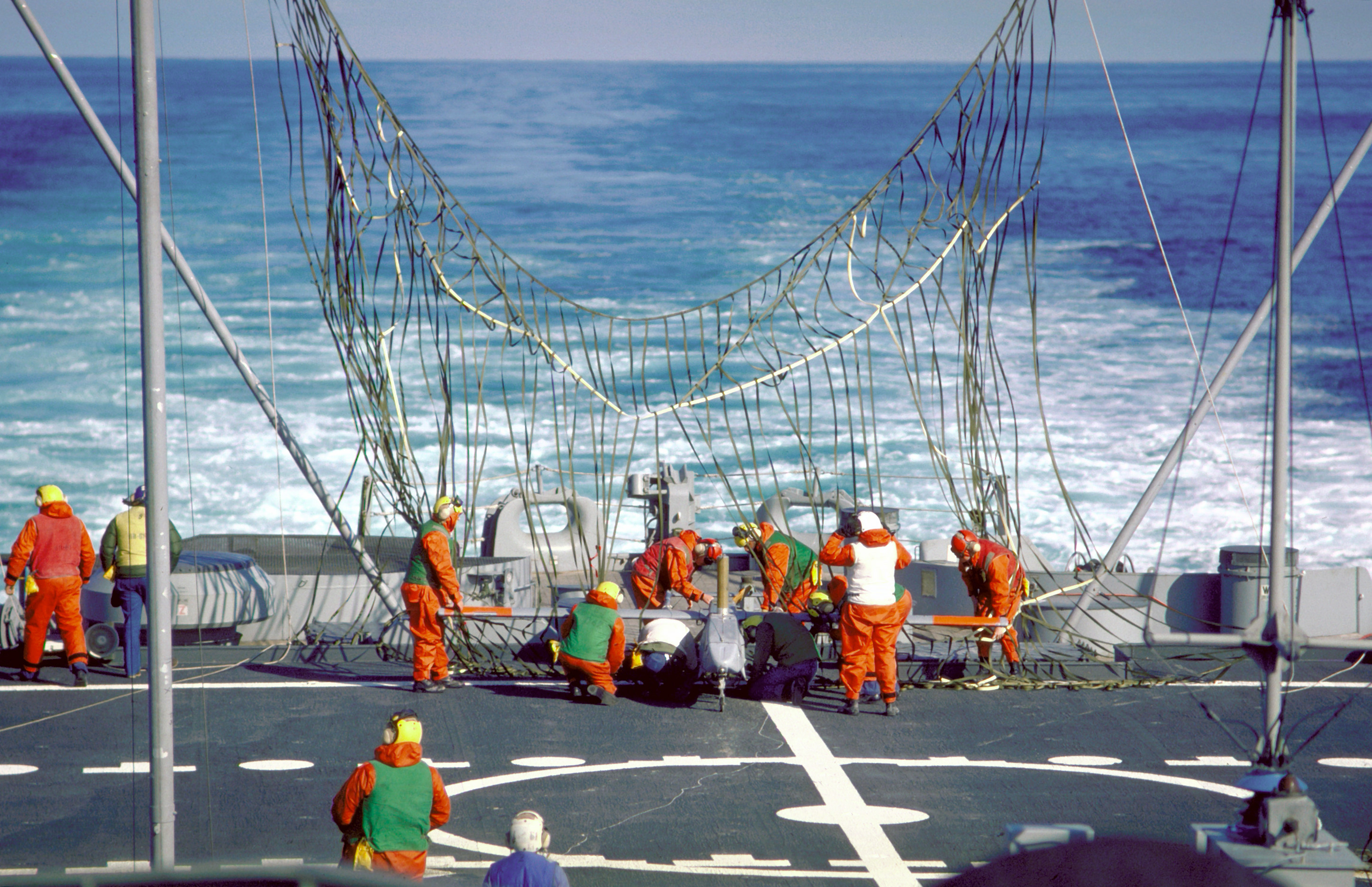
Crewmen recover an RQ-2 Pioneer aboard USS Iowa (BB-61)

Launched by rocket assist (shipboard), by catapult, or from a runway, the Pioneer recovers into a net (shipboard) or with arresting gear after flying up to five hours with a 75-pound (34 kg) payload. It flies day or night missions with a gimbaled EO/IR sensor, relaying analog video in real time via a C-band line-of-sight (LOS) data link. Since 1991, Pioneer has flown reconnaissance missions during the Persian Gulf, Somalia (UNOSOM II), Bosnia, Kosovo and Iraq conflicts. In 2005, the Navy operated two Pioneer systems (one for training) and the Marines operated two, each with five or more aircraft. It is also operated by Israel and the Republic of Singapore Air Force. In 2007 Pioneer was retired by the US Navy and was replaced by the Shadow UAV.

Internationally, Pioneer drones are perhaps most remembered for their role in the 1991 Gulf War, when a Pioneer launched by the Iowa-class battleship USS Wisconsin (BB-64) observed Iraqi troops on Failaka Island surrendering shortly after USS Missouri's attack on their trenchlines. When navy officials offered to transfer a Pioneer to the Smithsonian Institution, curators at the National Air and Space Museum specifically asked for the UAV that Iraqi troops surrendered to during the Gulf War.

In the 1991 Gulf War, the US Army operated a UAV Platoon from Ft. Huachuca, Arizona. The UAV Platoon conducted flight surveillance and target acquisition missions from KKMC and later, the unit pushed north (Operation Sand Hawk) where US Army combat engineers built a metal runway for the aircraft to launch and recover.

The "R" is the Department of Defense designation for reconnaissance; "Q" means unmanned aircraft system. The "2" refers to its being the second of a series of purpose-built unmanned reconnaissance aircraft systems.

== Specifications (RQ-2) ==
- Primary Function: Artillery Targeting and Acquisition, Control of Close Air Support, Reconnaissance and Surveillance, Battle Damage Assessment, Search and Rescue, Psychological Operations

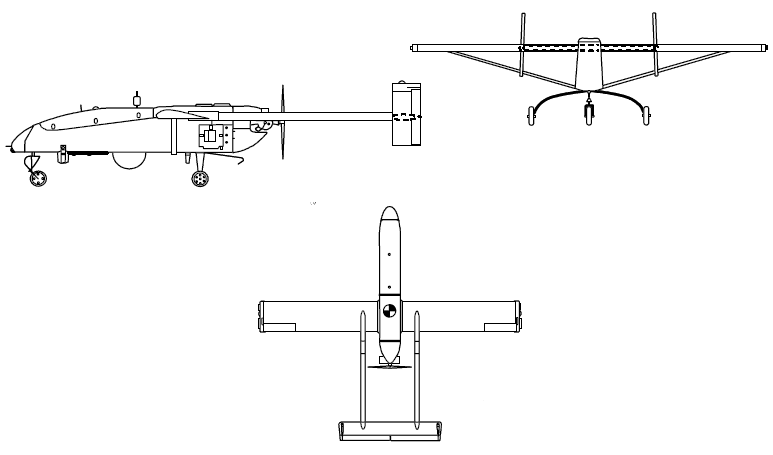
RQ-2B Pioneer

Data from

General characteristics

- Length: 4.3 m (14 ft)
- Wingspan: 5.151 m (16 ft 10.8 in)
- Height: 1.006 m (3 ft 3.6 in)
- Airfoil: NACA 4415
- Gross weight: 205 kg (452 lb)
- Fuel capacity: 44 to 47 L (11.6 to 12.4 US gal; 9.7 to 10.3 imp gal)
- Powerplant: 1 × ZF Sachs 2-stroke 2-cylinder horizontally-opposed piston engine, 19 kW (26 hp) or UEL AR-741 rotary engine; 28.3 kW (38.0 hp)

Performance

- Range: 185 km (115 mi, 100 nmi)
- Service ceiling: 4,600 m (15,100 ft)

Avionics
Dual Sensor (12DS/POP-200/POP-300)

== Operators ==
United States

- United States Marine Corps
  - VMU-1 'Watchdogs': Marine Corps Air Ground Combat Center Twentynine Palms, California
  - VMU-2 'Night Owls': MCAS Cherry Point, North Carolina

Sri Lanka

- Sri Lanka Air Force
- Sri Lanka Navy

=== Former operators ===
United States

- United States Army
  - UAV platoon deployed in Fort Huachuca, January-May 1991.
- United States Navy
  - VC-6 "Firebees": Naval Station Norfolk (decommissioned)
  - Training Air Wing 6 UAV Detachment: Naval Air Station Whiting Field (decommissioned)

== See also ==
Related development

- AAI RQ-7 Shadow

Aircraft of comparable role, configuration, and era

- Boeing Insitu ScanEagle

Related lists

- List of active United States military aircraft
