= INAS 343 =

- Active: 17 January 2011—present
- Country: India
- Branch: Indian Navy
- Type: Naval aviation Squadron
- Role: Reconnaissance
- Part of: Western Naval Command
- Garrison/HQ: Naval Air Enclave, Porbandar
- Nickname: Frontier Formidables

Aircraft flown
- Reconnaissance: Drishti-10 Starliner

INAS 343 (Indian Naval Air Squadron 343) is an aviation squadron of the Indian Navy, operating Drishti-10 Starliner UAVs based at Porbandar. It is the second squadron in the navy dedicated to operating UAVs after INAS 342 at Kochi. The squadron was raised in 2011 with 2 IAI Heron and IAI Searcher Mk-II each. The squadron is tasked with patrolling Northern Arabian Sea.

== Service history ==
The INAS 343 squadron of the Indian Navy lost both of the Heron drones in two separate crashes on 22 March and 14 April 2018, respectively. The first crash occurred minutes after takeoff at around 10 am IST due to engine failure, however, did not cause any loss of life or property. The drone was operational through manual mode. The second crash occurred due to loss of communication data link with the Ground Control Station (GCS) while the drone was on a routine surveillance mission. The crash occurred 25 km (16 mi) away from INS Sardar Patel at Porbandar at 1 pm IST.

In January and December 2024, the Indian Navy received two units of Drishti-10 Starliners, an Indian variant of Elbit Hermes 900.

On 11 December 2024, the Indian Navy de-inducted 8 Searcher Mk-II UAVs from INAS 342 and INAS 343 after 22 years of service after a ceremony in Kochi.
