= Manes Pratt =

Israeli scientist

- מנס פרת
- Born: 3 June 1911; Poland
- Died: 8 March 1987 (aged 75); Tel Aviv, Israel
- Military career
- Allegiance: Palmach; British Army; Israel Defense Forces
- Service years: 1936–1957
- Rank: Captain (British Army); Lieutenant Colonel (IDF)
- Commands: Head of Armaments Engineering Services
- Conflicts: World War II; 1948 Arab-Israeli War

Emanuel "Manes" Pratt (Hebrew: עמנואל "מנס" פרת; 3 June 1911 – 8 March 1987) was an Israeli scientist who was the founder and first head of the Dimona Nuclear Research Center, a key role in recognition of which he received the Israel Defense Prize in 1965.

== Biography ==
Pratt was born in Poland. In 1936, he migrated to British Mandate of Palestine. Soon after, he joined the Haganah. During World War II, he joined the Jewish Brigade's engineering division. In 1944, he became certified as a structural engineer.

After the Israel Defense Forces (IDF) was founded, he was made deputy chief ordnance officer. In 1950, he resigned from the military, but returned a few months later, in 1951, as chief ordnance officer, in order to spearhead the emerging Ordnance Corps. This involved unifying multiple disparate entities. He maintained that role until 1954, when the IDF's new Ordnance Corps was officially formed.

After this, he was appointed as the military attaché to Burma, until 1957, when he resigned from the IDF. At this point, he was recruited by Shimon Peres to found and lead the Dimona nuclear reactor. In 1976, he became the Ministry of Defense chief scientist. Pratt is known as the "father" of the Israeli nuclear programme.
