= Israel Defense Prize =

Israeli award

- פרס בטחון ישראל
- Awarded for: Significant contributions to the defense of the State of Israel
- Country: Israel
- Presented by: President of the State of Israel
- Established: 1958

The Israel Defense Prize (Hebrew: פרס בטחון ישראל), also known as the Israel Defense Award, is an award presented annually by the President of Israel to people and organizations who made significant contributions to the defense of the State of Israel.

The prize was first awarded in 1958. Three to four prizes are awarded each year. One is a lifetime achievement award, and two or three go to individuals or units whose efforts contributed to an operational field.

== Notable Recipients ==
Year	Recipient(s)	Notes
1958	Uziel Gal	Inventor of the Uzi Submachine Gun
1959	Yevgeny Ratner	Improvements on the Bazooka
1960	A rocket unit from Rafael	Development of the Luz Missile
1961	Israel Tal	
1962	An electromechanical unit from Rafael	Development of a proximity fuze
1963	A team from unit 515	Arabic eavesdropping
1964	David Laskov	
1965	Manes Pratt	Founding the Shimon Peres Negev Nuclear Research Center
1966	Ori Even-Tov	
1967	Pinchas Dagan	
1968	Shlomo Bashan, Sammy Harel, Moshe Meir, Ephraim Ashkenazi	A development that improved the gunsight of Air Force aircraft and enhanced the operational capabilities of the Mirage aircraft.
1969	Avraham Makob	Development of a runway penetration bomb
1970	Israel Orieli and Yair Bar On	On the improvement of radar for naval vessels
1971	A development team at Rafael, including Nahum Shapira, Ben-Zion Naveh, Dan Tzioni, Naftali Amit, Erwin Reiter, Yitzhak Nudleman, and Uzi Rav	Development of the Tal 1 cluster bomb against soft targets
1972	Sasson Yitzhayek	Impressive achievements in the field of codebreaking in Unit 8200
1973	Yisrael Galili and Yacov Leor	Development of the 'Galil' rifle
1974	Avner Avkin, Gedalia Aharoni, Shmuel Elad, Mordechai Chen, Chaim Prion, and David Raz from Israel Military Industries (IMI)	Commendation for their contribution to the development of artillery weapons
1975	A team from Unit 8200 of the Intelligence Corps (Sergio Hart, Micha Sharir, and Nathan Zimmerman)	
1976	Captain Amihud Rabin from the Aeronautical Engineering Branch of the Air Force.	Increasing the takeoff weight of Skyhawk aircraft, which improved their range and weapons-carrying capability.
1977	Caesarea Unit led by Mike Harari	A commendation from the Prize Committee for special activity
1978	An intelligence corps team (including Israel Radomski for the second time)	
1979	Shmuel Shtrikman	
1980	A team from the Intelligence Corps (including Shay Pilpel, Yaakov Yeshua, Ron Shamir, Chaim Wolfson, Nathan Zimmerman, Ora Hadas, Yehuda Hartman, Yonatan Stern, Hanokh Wexler, Doron Edelman, Naftali Tashbi, Mordechai Tenenhaus, and Chaim Held)	Impressive achievements in a field vital to the security of the state
1981	Charlie Attali, David Harari and Michael Schaefer	Development of the "Zahavan" — the IDF's first UAV (Unmanned Aerial Vehicle)
1982	Haim Laskov	Lifetime Achievement Award
1983	A team of researchers and engineers from the Air Force (including Yohanan Levanon)	For the development of intelligence and electronic warfare systems
1984	A team from the Intelligence Corps (including Noga Alon)	
1985	A team from the missile unit at Rafael	Development of the "Red Slope" thermal imaging system for Machbet
1986	A development team at Rafael (including Dr. Yosef Levin and Dr. Naftali Amit [for the second time] from Rafael, and Moshe Horev from the Air Force)	Development of the "Popeye" ("Hamudon") missile
1987	Gabriel Ilan, Avi Morgenstern	
1988	Israel Rubin	For his work in the Printing Department of the Mossad’s Technology Division.
1989	A team from the Air Force and from Elta and Keren Electronics	For the development and production of a system for the Air Force
2020	Project involving the Mossad, Rafael, the Israeli Air Force, and the Central Collection Unit of the Intelligence Directorate	"Provided the IDF with unique capabilities; achieved technological breakthroughs and demonstrated exceptional vision, creativity, and determination."
2020	Israel Aerospace Industries project, in collaboration with the Israeli Air Force, the Directorate of Defense Research and Development, Rafael, and Elbit Systems	“The project was carried out with exceptional courage and determination, overcame unprecedented technological knowledge gaps, and enabled a significant leap in IDF capabilities.”
2020	Project of the Intelligence Directorate and the Israel Security Agency (Shin Bet)	“The project includes innovative developments across diverse fields and makes a significant contribution to national security.”
2020	A Mossad operative, for cyber activity	Lifetime Achievement Award “for a longstanding contribution to national security and for initiating numerous technological solutions, while demonstrating exceptional talent, creativity, curiosity, and boldness.”
2021	Project of the Directorate of Defense Research and Development, in collaboration with Rafael, Israel Aerospace Industries, and the Israeli Air Force	“Designed to create systemic cyber defense against the threat of cyberattacks, which has become a significant and daily threat in recent years.”
2021	Project of the Spectrum and Cyber Defense Brigade of the IDF C4I and Cyber Defense Directorate, in collaboration with the Director of Security of the Defense Establishment, the Israel National Cyber Directorate, the Mossad, the Israel Security Agency, and the Intelligence Directorate	“The project was carried out with exceptional courage and determination, overcame unprecedented technological knowledge gaps, and enabled a significant leap in IDF capabilities.”
2021	Project of Unit 81 within the Intelligence Directorate, in collaboration with the Israeli Air Force, the Directorate of Defense Research and Development, Rafael, Israel Aerospace Industries, and the Mossad	“The project delivered a professional, unique, and significant capability for the IDF. This capability resulted from breakthroughs and unique, purpose-built developments, achieved through the courage, vision, determination, and creativity of all participating organizations.”
2021	Project of Unit 8200 within the Intelligence Directorate	evelopment of a unique intelligence-access capability: “It provided the IDF and the broader security establishment with a distinctive, groundbreaking, and exceptional capability, significantly enhancing the IDF’s operational capacity.”
2022	Directorate of Defense Research and Development, Unit 9900, Israel Aerospace Industries, and Elbit Systems	Ofek satellite project — Ofek 11 and Ofek 16.
2022	Unit 8200, including Lt. Col. Matan Derman, the Mossad, the Israel Security Agency, and the Director of Security of the Defense Establishment	A project aimed at developing powerful, groundbreaking capabilities through diverse and unique methods.
2022	The Mossad, the R&D Unit of the Directorate of Defense Research and Development, and the defense industries	A project intended to preserve Israel’s qualitative advantage in the face of strategic threats.
2023	Spectrum and Cyber Defense Brigade	A classified system developed by the Spectrum and Cyber Defense Brigade, with all IDF branches participating in its development and operational deployment, including the C4I and Cyber Defense Directorate, the Air and Space Arm, the Intelligence Directorate, and the Navy. The system is a unique cyber-defense capability that makes breakthrough use of advanced technologies to ensure the IDF’s security and freedom of action in the digital domain against evolving and sophisticated cyber threats.
2023	Israel Security Agency, in collaboration with Unit 8200	Development and implementation of a unique technological system that enables intelligence and security superiority across multiple operational arenas. The system is groundbreaking and makes a significant contribution to the intelligence community’s work in addressing security challenges.
2023	The Mossad and Unit 8200	An initiative with a significant and unique strategic contribution to national security, embodying technological innovation and exceptional, groundbreaking operational boldness.
2023	Special Operations Array, Air and Space Arm, Navy, Israel Aerospace Industries, and Rafael	An initiative delivering an exceptional technological solution through which a groundbreaking operational capability was achieved. It contributes directly to preserving the IDF’s qualitative advantage and Israel’s national security. The project combines several innovative and unique technological developments made possible through the vision, determination, and creativity of all project partners.
2024	Elbit Systems	
