= Charley Attali =

French-Israeli aerospace engineer (1930–2006)

- צ'רלי אטאלי
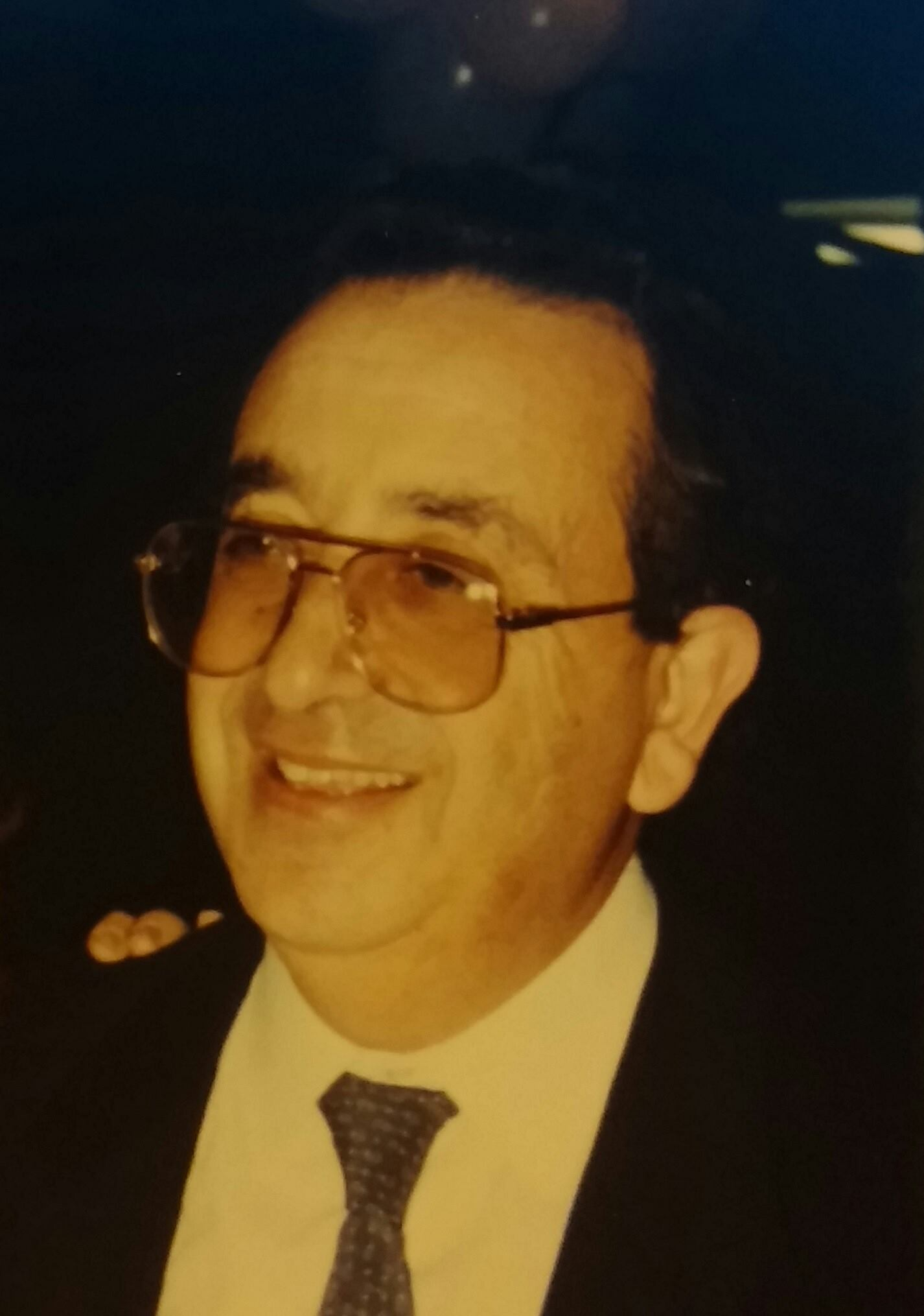
- Born: 17 December 1930; Constantine, Algeria
- Died: 22 April 2006 (aged 75); Tel Aviv, Israel
- Citizenship: French, Israeli, Algerian
- Education: École nationale de l'aviation civile
- Occupation: Aerospace engineer
- Employer(s): Sud Aviation, SEREB, Israel Aerospace Industries
- Known for: Chief engineer of Diamant, project lead of IAI Scout
- Spouse: Violette Attali
- Awards: French Legion of Honour (1965), Israel Defense Prize (1981)

Charley Shalom Attali (Hebrew: צ'רלי שלום אטאלי; sometimes misspelled as Charles Chalom Attali; 1930–2006) was an Algerian-born French-Israeli aerospace engineer.

== Early life and education ==
Attali was born in Constantine, Algeria to a Jewish family. Upon graduating high school at age 16 after skipping a grade, he was sent to study at École nationale de l'aviation civile in France, where he excelled and graduated as an engineer.

== Early career ==
After completing his studies in 1952, Attali was initially employed at Sud Aviation, before eventually working for SEREB on developing ballistic missiles. While at SEREB, Attali was appointed by French president Charles de Gaulle to lead the Diamant project. Due to the success of Diamant, Attali was awarded the Legion of Honour in 1965 by Charles de Gaulle. After the Diamant project, Attali was placed in charge of France's role in the Europa-1 rocket.

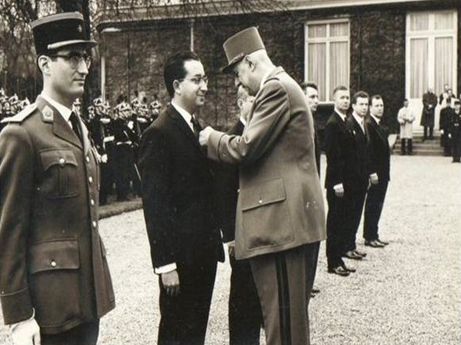
Attali receiving the Legion of Honour from Charles de Gaulle in 1965.

== Move to Israel ==
In 1969 Moshe Arens, who served as vice-president of the IAI, secretly flew to Paris to meet with Attali. Due to France's weapons embargo on Israel, Israel was planning to develop their own fighter jets. Arens asked Attali to move to Israel and help in the development of the IAI Kfir. Attali agreed, and made Aliyah shortly after with his wife and two children.

While at the IAI, Attali had a key role in the development of many aircraft including the IAI Kfir, IAI Arye, and IAI Lavi. For leading the IAI Scout, Attali received the Israel Defense Prize in 1981. He continued working at the IAI until his retirement in 1995.

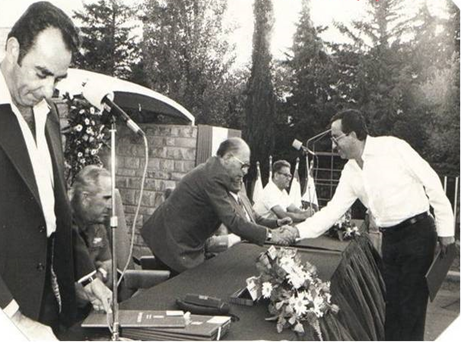
Attali receiving the Israel Defense Prize from Menachem Begin in 1981.
