= Porbandar Airport =

Airport in Gujarat, India

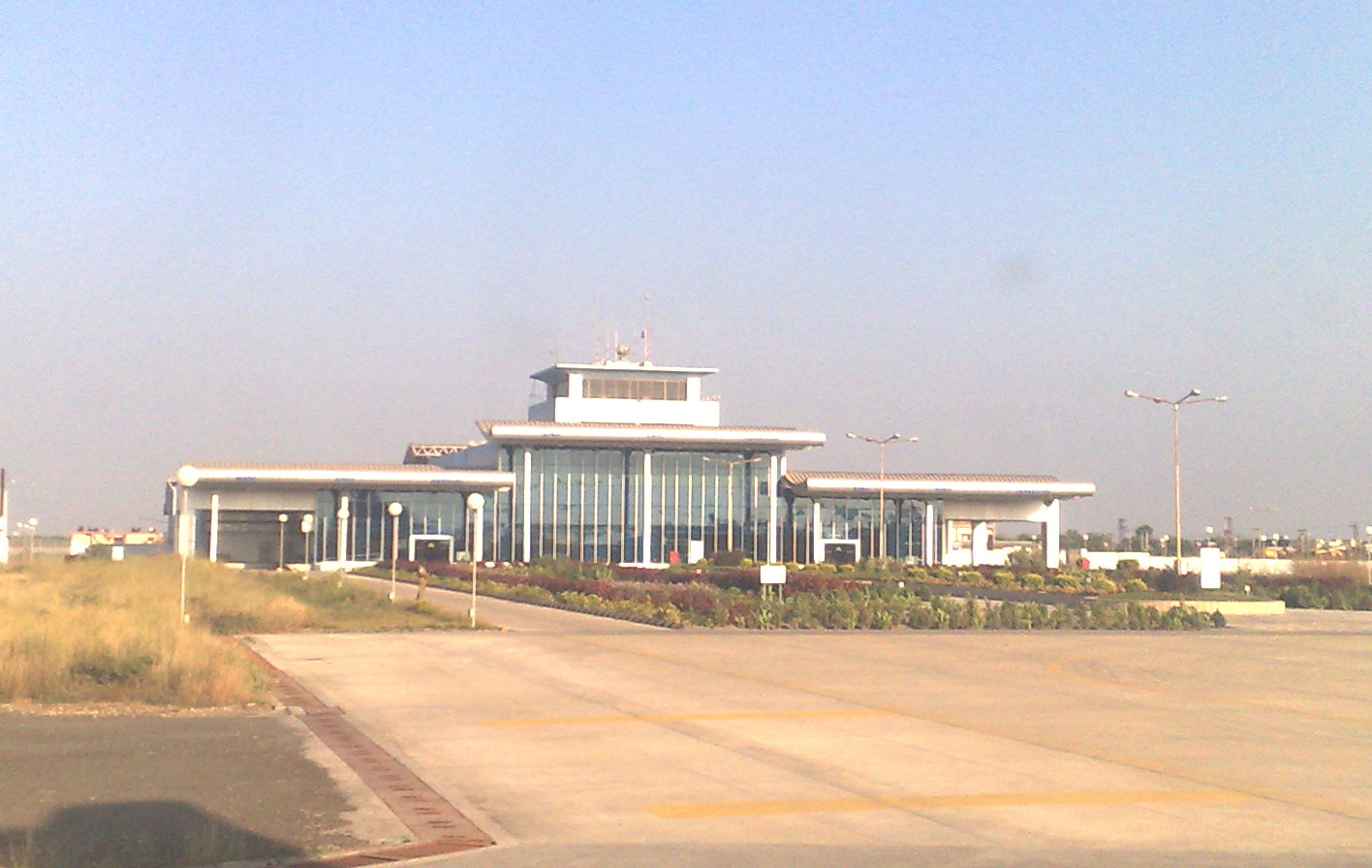
- IATA: PBD; ICAO: VAPR

Summary
- Airport type: Public
- Operator: Airports Authority of India
- Serves: Porbandar
- Location: Porbandar, Gujarat, India
- Elevation AMSL: 17 ft (5.2 m)
- Coordinates: 21°38′55″N 069°39′26″E
- Website: Porbandar Airport

Map
- Location of airport in India PBD (India)

Runways
Direction	Length		Surface
Direction	m	ft	Surface
09/27	1,372	4,500	Asphalt

Statistics (April 2025 - March 2026)
- Passengers: 10,935 (▲1,475.7%)
- Aircraft movements: 320 (▲140.6%)
- Cargo tonnage: 0 ( 0%)
- Source: AAI

Porbandar Airport (IATA: PBD, ICAO: VAPR) is a domestic airport and an Indian Navy base serving the city of Porbandar in the state of Gujarat, India. The airport had direct flights to Ahmedabad, Delhi and Mumbai since the 1980s, all of which were discontinued in 2020. After a brief period of inactivity, the airport restarted operations in March 2025 with daily direct flights to Mumbai operated by SpiceJet, which was operated before until 2019 and 2021. Apart from civilian operations, it has a military presence in the form of INAS 343 of the Indian Navy and CGAE Porbandar of the Indian Coast Guard. A new terminal building was opened in April 2008.

== Structure ==
The airfield is spread over 278.32 acres (1.1263 km^{2}), has a 4,500 feet (1,400 m) long runway and an apron that can accommodate 2 ATR 72 aircraft. The new 4,000 square metres (43,000 sq ft) Terminal Building at Porbandar Airport has been built at a cost of ₹13.50 crore (US$1.4 million). The building has six Check-in Counters and two Conveyor Belts in the Arrivals hall and can handle 100 arriving and 100 departing passengers at a time.

== Airlines and destinations ==
Airlines	Destinations
Alliance Air	Keshod, Mumbai

== Military operations ==
=== Naval Air Enclave ===
- INAS 343, Unmanned Aerial Vehicle (UAV) Squadron, was commissioned at the Naval Air Enclave, Porbandar in January 2011. This is the first Operational UAV Squadron under the Western Naval Command. Nicknamed ‘Frontier Formidables’, the Squadron has the dual tasks of undertaking operational missions besides providing training. As of 2024, the squadron operates 2 Drishti 10 Starliner UAVs inducted in 2024.
- INAS 314 "Raptors" a new EW squadron was established on 29 November 2019. This squadron is responsible to undertake maritime surveillance in North Arabian Sea. Dornier 228 is currently operated by this squadron.

=== CGAE Porbandar ===
Coast Guard Air Enclave, Porbandar, was commissioned on 12 June 2008. It provides logistical and administrative support to the Dornier Flight and 850 Sqn (ICG) which operates the Advanced Light Helicopter (ALH).

== See also ==
- List of Indian Navy bases
- List of active Indian Navy ships
