= IAI Searcher =

Family of reconnaissance drones

Searcher
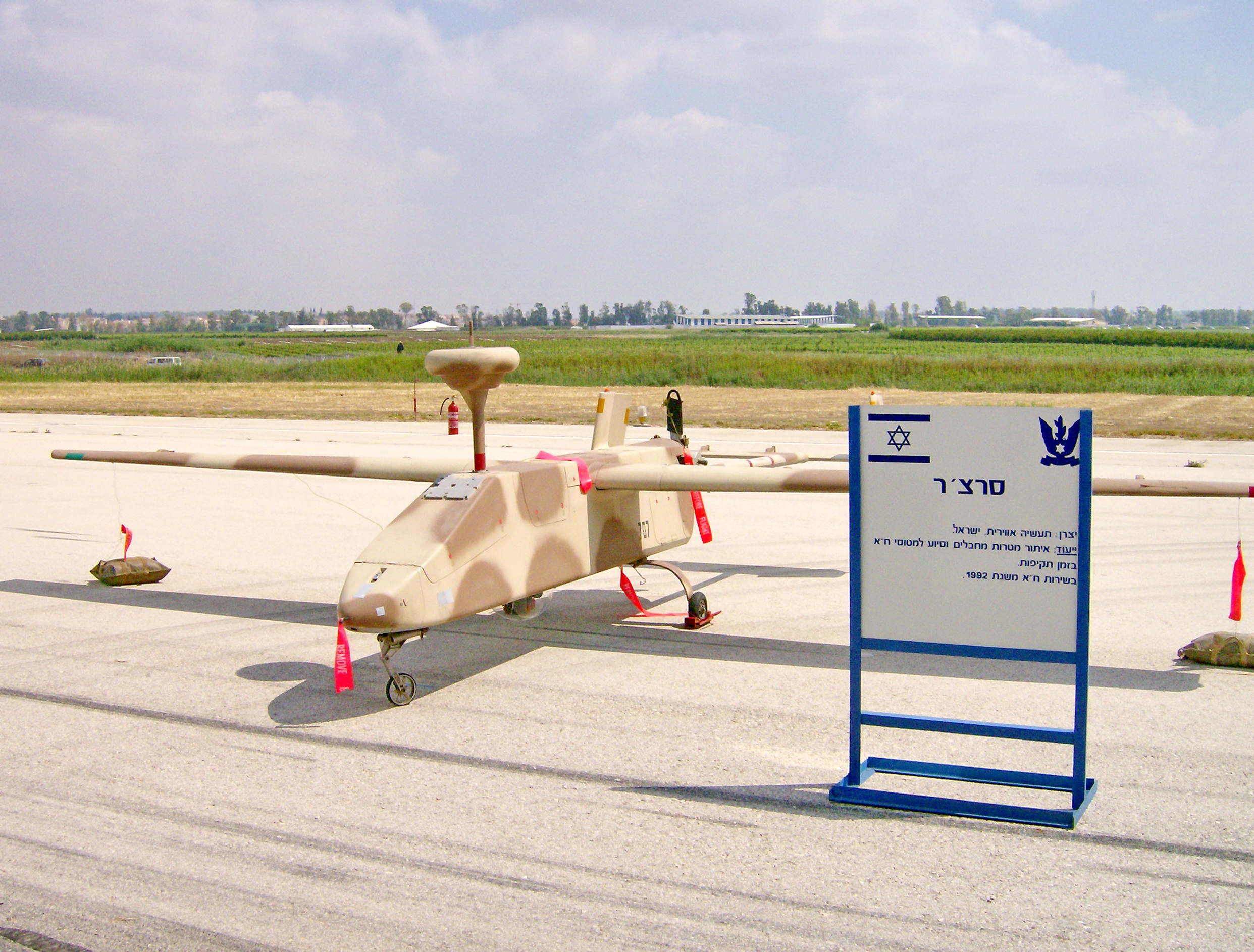
- IAI Searcher in Tel Nof Airbase, Israel

General information
- Type: Reconnaissance UAV
- National origin: Israel
- Manufacturer: IAI
- Primary users: Sri lanka

History
- Introduction date: Searcher 1 - 1992; Searcher 2 - 1998

The IAI Searcher (also known by the Hebrew name מרומית Meyromit - "Marsh tern", or officially in Israel as the חוגלה Hugla - "Alectoris") is a reconnaissance UAV developed in Israel in the 1980s. In the following decade, it replaced the IMI Mastiff and IAI Scout UAVs then in service with the Israeli Army.

== Design ==
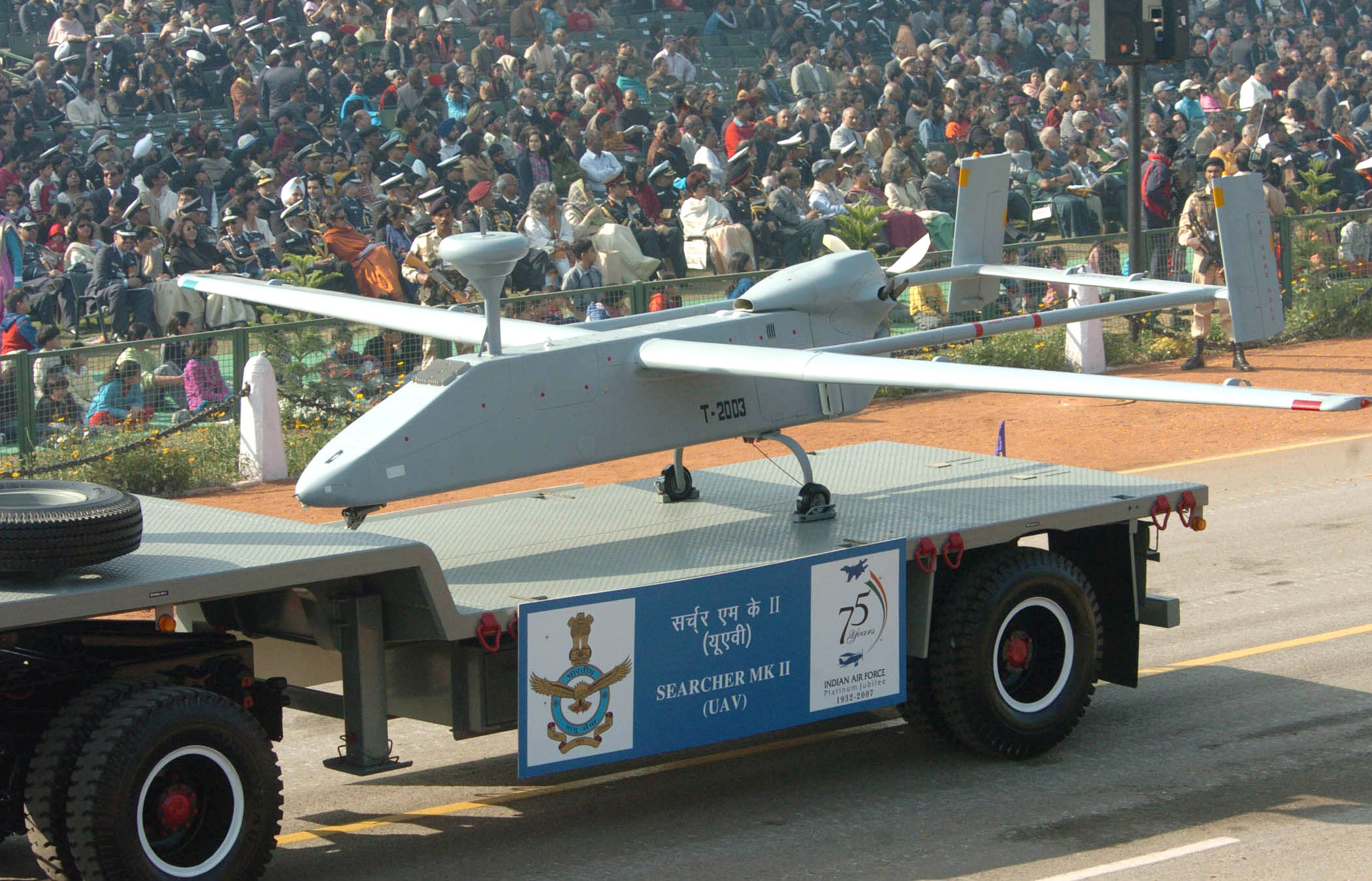
The Searcher MK-II (Unmanned Aerial Vehicle) passes through the Rajpath during the 58th Republic Day Parade - 2007, in New Delhi on January 26, 2007

The Searcher looks almost identical to the Scout and Pioneer, but is in fact scaled up and is well over twice the size of the Scout. The Searcher is powered by a 35 kW (47 hp) piston engine. The new design features updated avionics and sensor systems with greater flight endurance as well as increased redundancy for improved survivability. In addition to Israel, the system had been exported and is or was in use by Singapore and Turkey, as well as Thailand, Russia, India, South Korea, and Sri Lanka.

== Service history ==
Around 100 Searcher UAVs are being operated by the Indian Armed Forces. While the Indian Army operates at least 25 units of Mk I and Mk II variant, the Indian Air Force and the Indian Navy operates the Mk II variant only. On 7 June 2002, a PAF F-16B Block 15 (S. No. 82-605) shot down an IAF Searcher II, using an AIM-9L Sidewinder missile, during a night interception near Lahore. On 11 December 2024, the Indian Navy de-inducted 8 Searcher Mk IIs from INAS 342 and INAS 343 at Kochi.

The Indonesian military used Searcher Mk II lent from Republic of Singapore Air Force during the 1996 Mapenduma hostage crisis to search for the location of hostages held by the Free Papua Movement. The Indonesian Strategic Intelligence Agency ordered 4 Searcher Mk IIs in 2006 and they were received in 2012. The UAVs were acquired via a Filipino company.

It took part in the large-scale Russian-Belarusian exercise Zapad in September 2021.

On 13 March 2022, the Russian Ministry of Defence released video of the use of the updated Russian version in Ukraine. In 2025, the Forpost-R would enter service in the Russian Navy.

On July 27, 2026, a Forpost-R was shot down in Kursk Oblast by a Chaklun-KM Interceptor drone of the 414th Unmanned Strike Aviation Brigade, being the sixth visually confirmed loss of the system during the war.

== Crashes ==
10 June 2002 – Searcher Mark-II, operated by Indian Air Force for reconnaissance, was shot down by a Pakistan Air Force F-16B using AIM-9L Sidewinder at an altitude of 13,000 ft, after it was spotted by the mobile observation units.

21 November 2017 – A Searcher Mk-II of the Indian Navy crashed in the north of INS Garuda, Kochi just after take-off at 10:25 am IST during routine surveillance mission. The crash occurred due to technical issues.

11 July 2018 – A Russian "Forpost" UAV was found on 12 July in a field close to the village of Barqah, about 12 kilometres from the Israeli side of the Golan Heights (Syria) but none of the belligerents claimed the shot-down nor the loss.

11 March 2022 – a Russian "Forpost" UAV was claimed to be shot down in Zhitomir Oblast.

18 March 2024 – a Searcher Mk-II drone of the Indian Navy crashed while landing after a routine training sortie at INS Garuda. The UAV touched the ground about one mile short of the runway at 5 pm IST. No injuries or damage to property has been reported. A team was immediately dispatched to render the UAV safe.

== Operators ==
=== Current operators ===
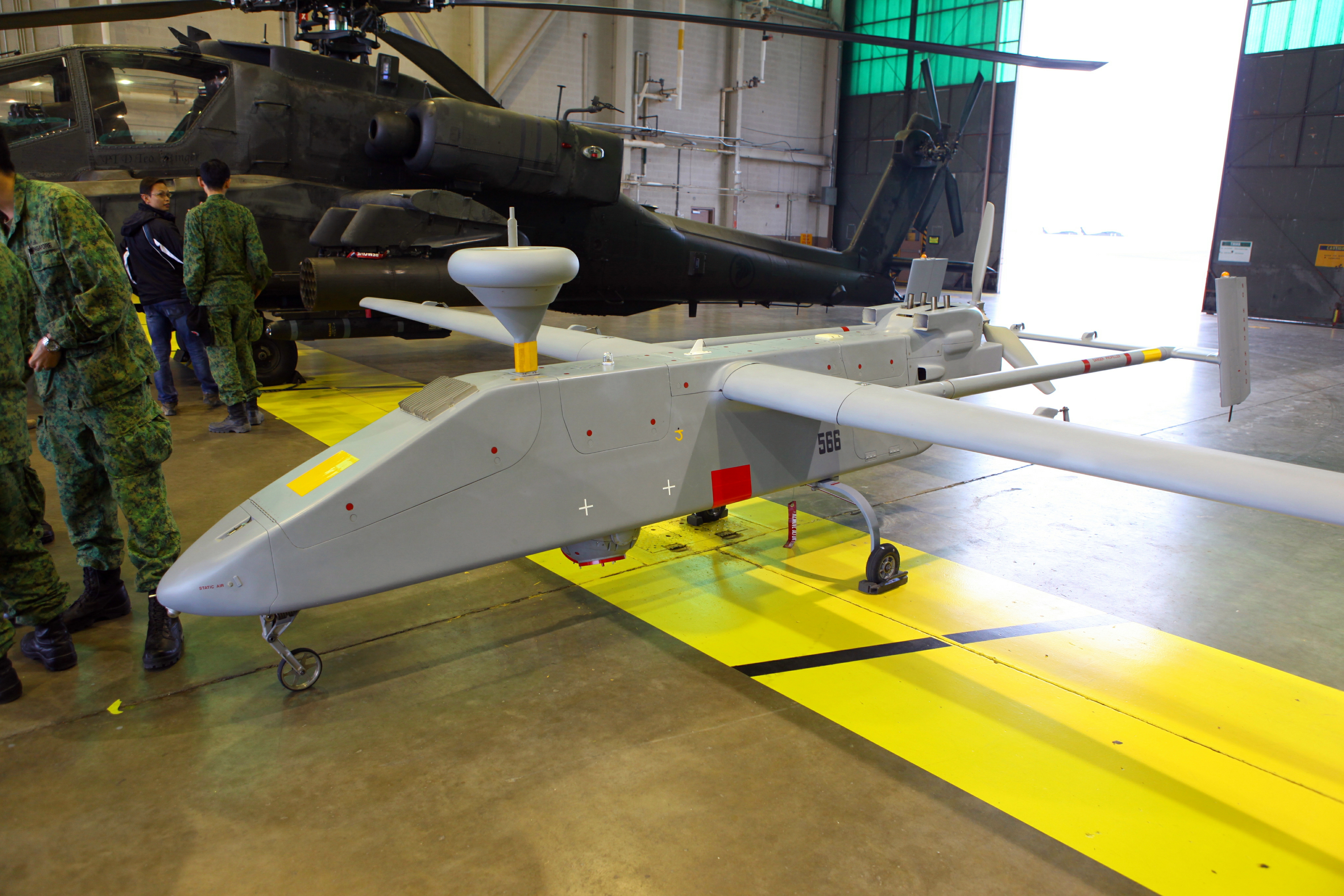
A Republic of Singapore Air Force's IAI Searcher II at Henry Post Army Airfield (Fort Sill, Oklahoma).

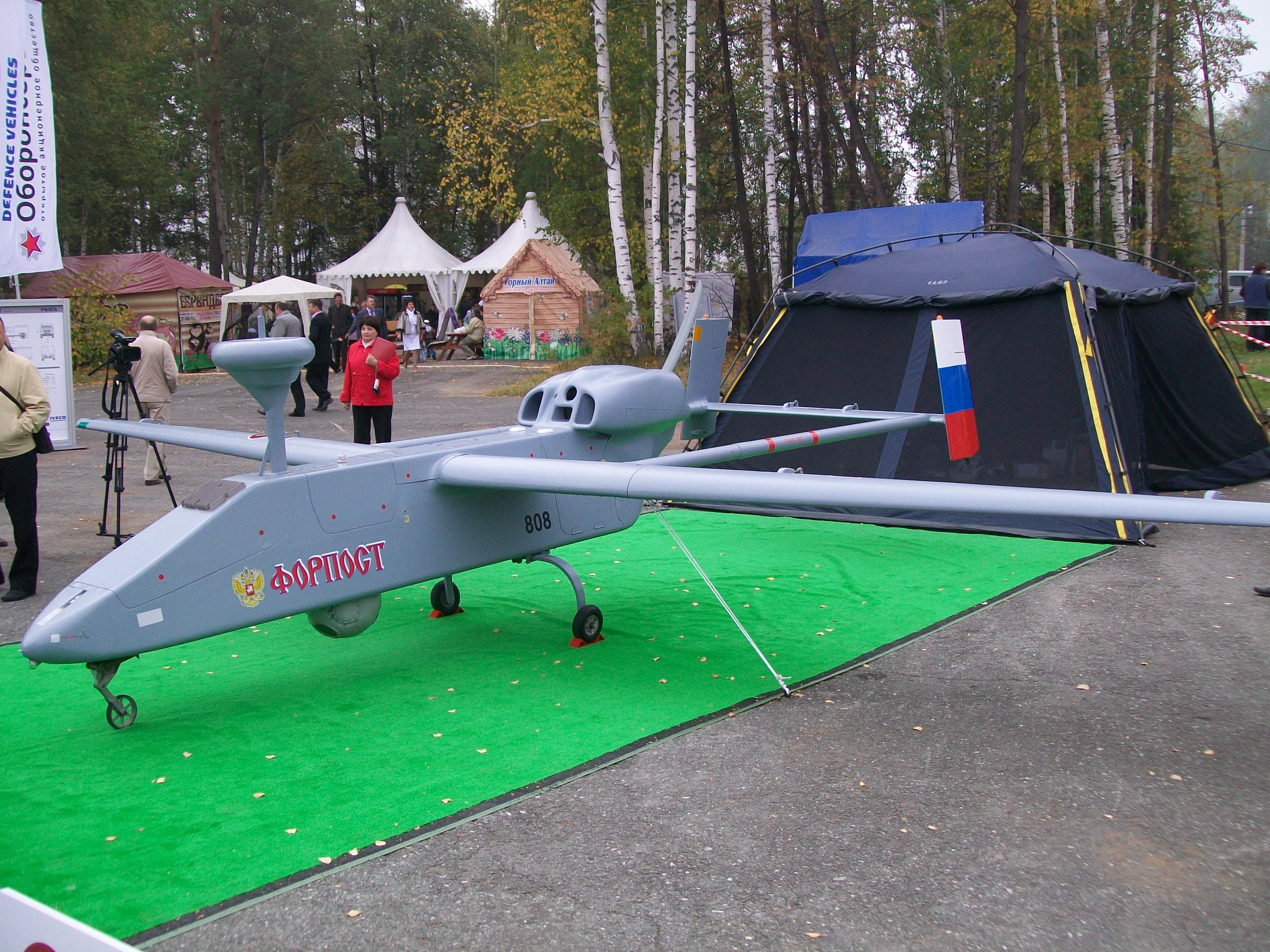
Russian Forpost.

- Azerbaijan
- Canada
  - Canadian Security Intelligence Service
- Cyprus
- Ecuador
- India: Total 108 received including those of the Navy.
  - Indian Army
  - Indian Air Force
- Indonesia
  - Indonesian Strategic Intelligence Agency: 4 Searcher Mk II.
- Israel
- Republic of Korea
- Russia: as Forpost (Форпост) licensed copy with a 250 km range. 30 systems with 3 UAVs each. The fully domestic version Forpost-R made its first flight in late August 2019. 10 Forpost-R systems were ordered. Deliveries of the modified UCAVs with reconnaissance and strike capabilities started in 2020. Russia has decided to continue domestic production of the Forpost-R.
- Spain: To be replaced by Airbus Sirtap UAS.
- Sri Lanka
- Syria (operated as Forpost-R UCAV)
- Thailand

=== Former operators ===
- India
  - Indian Navy: 8 Searcher Mk IIs operated by INAS 342 and INAS 343 from 2002 to 2024.
- Singapore
  - Republic of Singapore Air Force: retired; replaced by IAI Heron-1 in 2011.

== Specifications ==
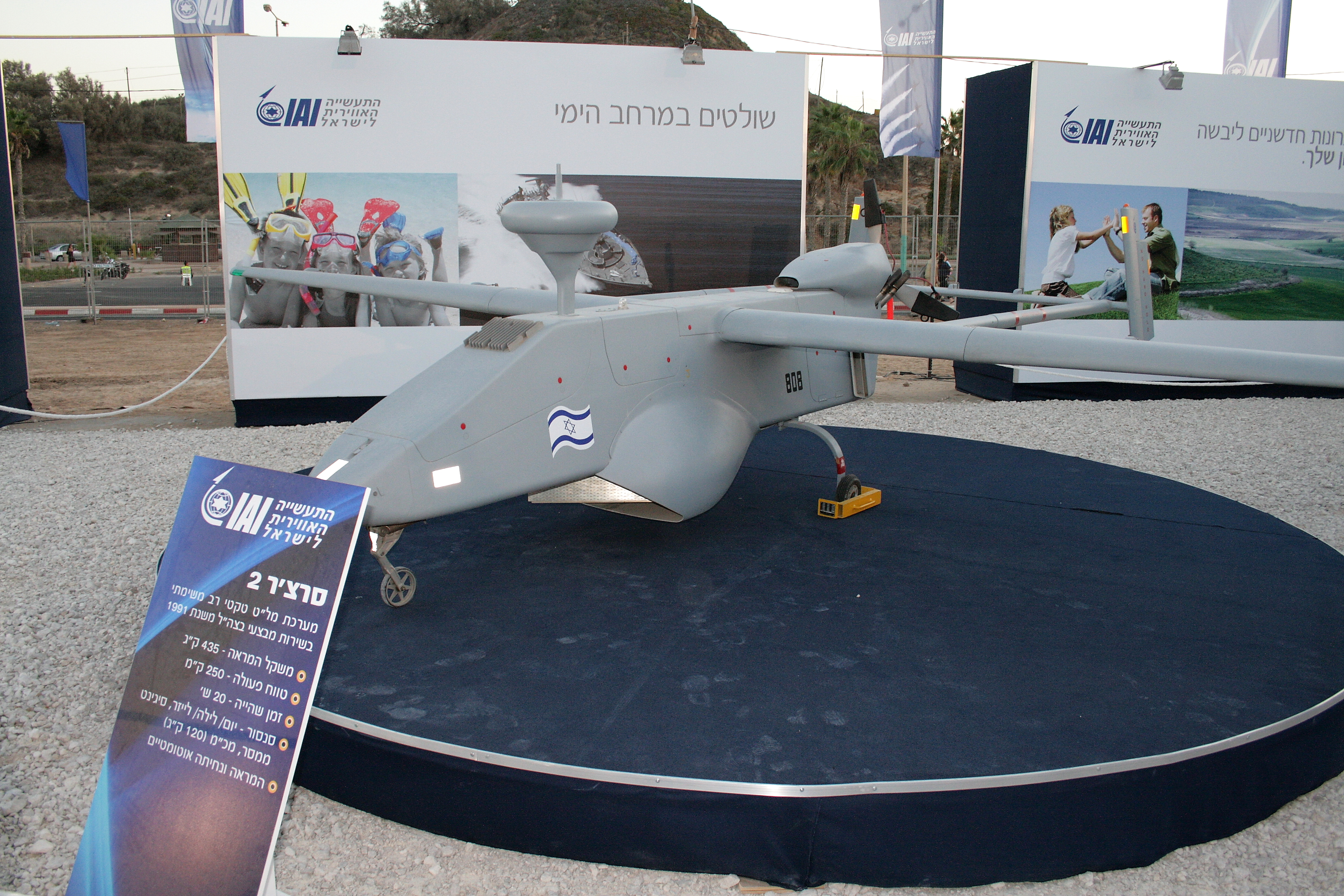
The IAI Searcher II

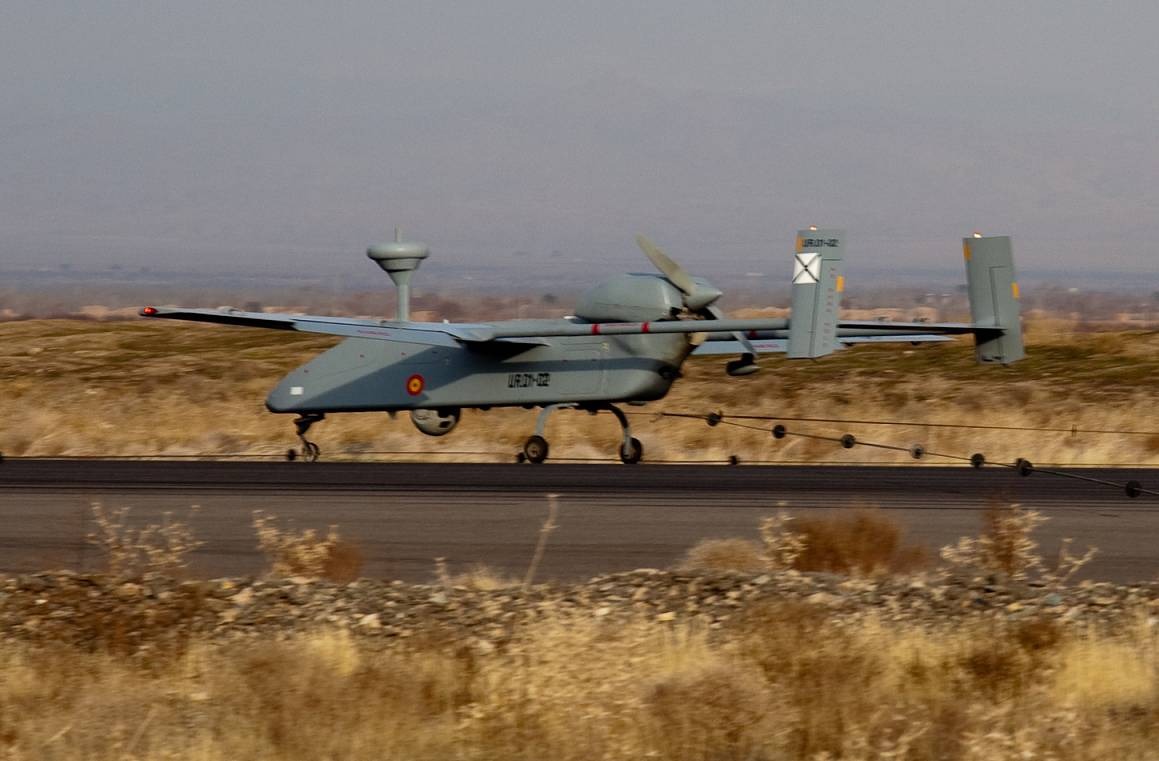
A Spanish IAI Searcher Mk.II-J

=== Searcher II MK3 ===
Data from IAI Searcher II MK3

General characteristics

- Crew: Unmanned
- Capacity: 68 kg (150 lb) payload
- Length: 5.85 m (19 ft 2 in)
- Wingspan: 8.55 m (28 ft 0 in)
- Height: 1.25 m (4 ft 1 in)
- Gross weight: 450 kg (992 lb)
- Payload:120 kg (260 lb)
- Powerplant: 1 × Limbach L 550 , 35 kW (47 hp)
- Propellers: Born Propeller 120cm 3 blade adjustable pitch

Performance

- Maximum speed: 201 km/h (125 mph, 110 kn)
- Range: 350 km (220 mi, 190 nmi)
- Endurance: 20 hours
- Service ceiling: 6,100 m (21,000 ft)
- Loiter speed: 110 to 150 km/h; 69 to 92 mph (60 to 80 kn)

== Forpost-R ==
The Forpost-R is the designation for the Russian developed UCAV based on the IAI Searcher. In 2008, Russia had approached Israel to import drones following the Russo-Georgian War, with Israel refusing to provide armed drones, an agreement was made to provide IAI Searchers MKII.

According to a YouTube video and information published by the Russian Ministry of Defense on March 13, 2022 (three weeks after the start of Russo-Ukrainian war), Russian armed forces have used an armed version of the Forpost-R to destroy a multiple launch rocket system of the Ukrainian army from an altitude of 3,000 m using guided missiles.

According to a video surfaced online and information published by the Russian Ministry of Defense on June 21, 2024, Russian armed forces used a strike version of the Forpost-R unmanned aerial vehicle to destroy militants in Syria.

In March 2025, an export version of the Forpost-R, known as Forpost-RE, was unveiled at the IDEX 2025 military booth in Dubai. On April 20, 2025, Ukraine claimed to intercept and shot down a Russian "Forpost" at an altitude of 4 km for the first time using an interceptor drone.

=== Armaments (Forpost-R) ===
- X-BPLA anti tank missile
- KAB-20

== See also ==
Aircraft of comparable role, configuration, and era

- IAI Pioneer
- IAI Scout
