= IAI Scout =

Israeli reconnaissance unmanned air vehicle

Scout
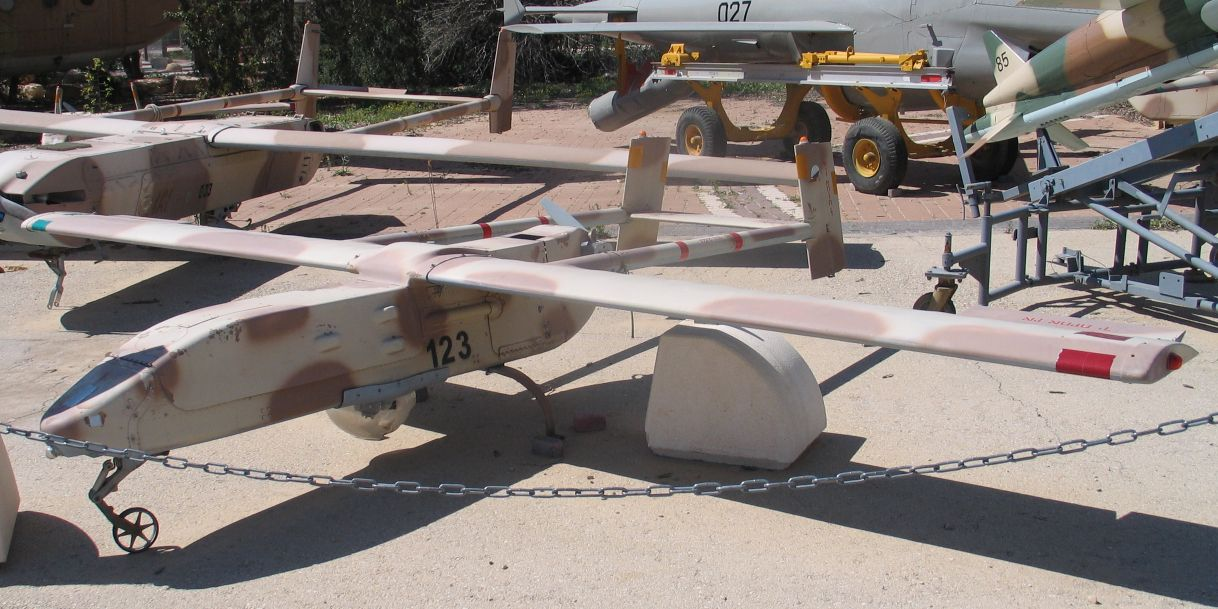
- Scout (foreground) at the Israeli Air Force Museum

General information
- Type: Reconnaissance UAV
- National origin: Israel
- Manufacturer: Israel Aircraft Industries
- Primary users: Israeli Air Force Israeli Army; Republic of Singapore Air Force

The IAI Scout (known in Israel under its Hebrew name זהבן - "Oriole") is a reconnaissance unmanned air vehicle developed in Israel in the 1970s by Israel Aircraft Industries as a competitor to the Tadiran Mastiff. The project was led by Charley Attali, David Harari, and Michael Shefer who were all awarded the 1981 Israel Defense Prize.

During the 1970s, the Israeli military was becoming increasingly interested in battlefield UAVs, and in response IAI management finally decided that they were interested in the concept as well. The Scout had a similar configuration as the Mastiff, with a pusher propeller and a twin-boom tail.

== Design and development ==
In 1981, the IAI Scout drone, was first operated in combat missions by the South African Defence Force against Angola during Operation Protea.

== Operational history ==
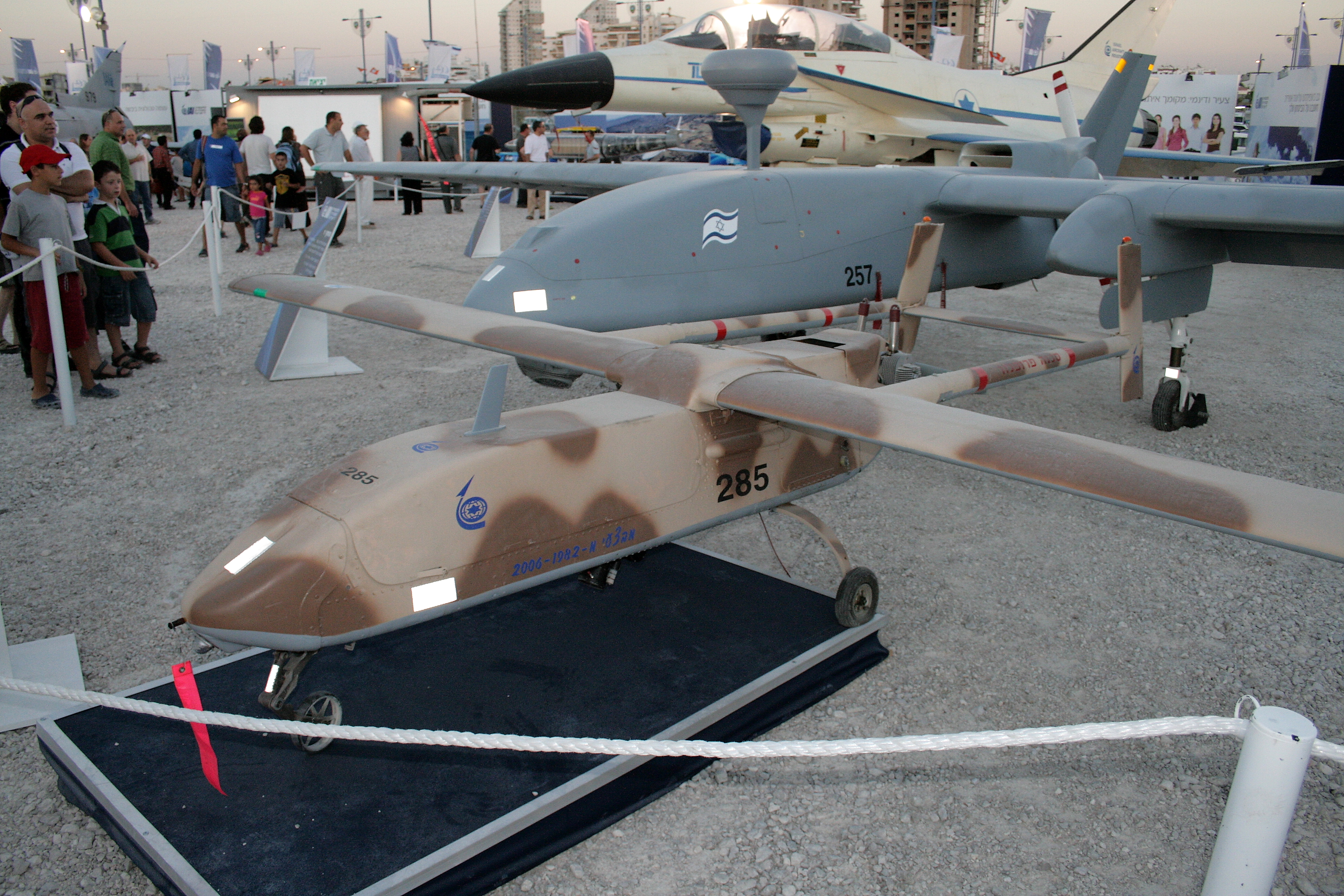
Scout UAV

During the 1982 Lebanon War, the Israelis were confronted by Syrian surface-to-air missiles (SAMs), which were heavily sited in Lebanon's Bekaa Valley. All 28 SAM sites in the Bekaa were destroyed, however, partly through the use of Samson decoys to get them to reveal their presence, and partly through reconnaissance information obtained by the Mastiff and Scout UAVs.

Israeli battlefield UAVs had proven a great success, and soon came to the attention of the US military, particularly after the American intervention in Lebanon in 1983. This led to the US Navy's request for a battlefield UAV in 1984, and Tadiran and IAI decided, or were told to, join forces to submit a proposal for the American requirement. The result was an IAI division named "Mazlat" (the Hebrew acronym for Miniature UAV), now "Malat" (Hebrew acronym of UAV).

The US military is reluctant to buy from foreign sources, so foreign companies usually team up with an American company to invite sales. AAI had already worked with Tadiran to sell the Mastiff in the US, so AAI was a logical choice, and Mazlat and AAI developed the Pioneer, which won the competition. Since then, Malat has developed more advanced battlefield UAVs, and has collaborated on battlefield UAV developments with partners such as AAI.

After consolidating production of the Mastiff and Scout, the Malat company continued to sell them in slightly refined versions for over a decade. Both aircraft have fixed landing gear and are generally operated from runways, performing short landings using an arresting-wire hook, though they may be launched using a hydraulic catapult off the back of a truck, and recovered by a net. They both carry imaging sensors in a turret underneath the fuselage.

The Mastiff and Scout remained in service with the Israeli Army and the Republic of Singapore Air Force until the early 1990s, when they were replaced by the IAI Searcher.

== Operators ==
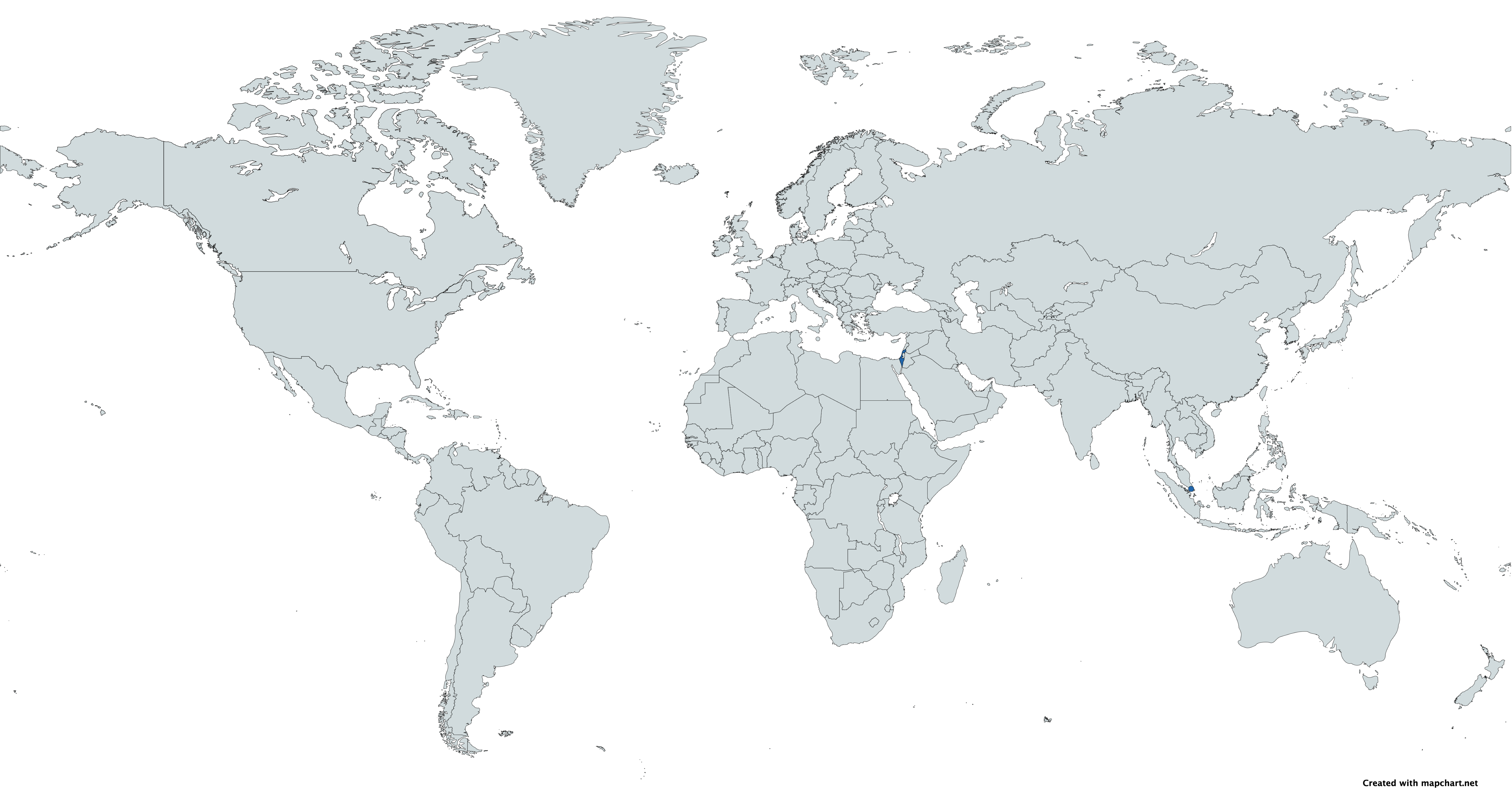
A map with operators of the IAI Scout in blue

Israel

- Israeli Air Force
- Israeli Army

Singapore

- Republic of Singapore Air Force

== Specifications ==
General characteristics

- Crew: none
- Capacity: 38 kg (84 lb) payload
- Length: 3.68 m (12 ft 1 in)
- Wingspan: 4.96 m (16 ft 3 in)
- Height: 0.94 m (3 ft 1 in)
- Empty weight: 96 kg (211 lb)
- Gross weight: 159 kg (350 lb)
- Powerplant: 1 × piston engine , 16 kW (22 hp)

Performance

- Maximum speed: 176 km/h (109 mph, 95 kn)
- Endurance: 7 hours 30 minutes
- Service ceiling: 4,600 m (15,000 ft)

== See also ==
Aircraft of comparable role, configuration, and era

- Tadiran Mastiff
