= Tadiran Mastiff =

Unmanned military aircraft

Mastiff
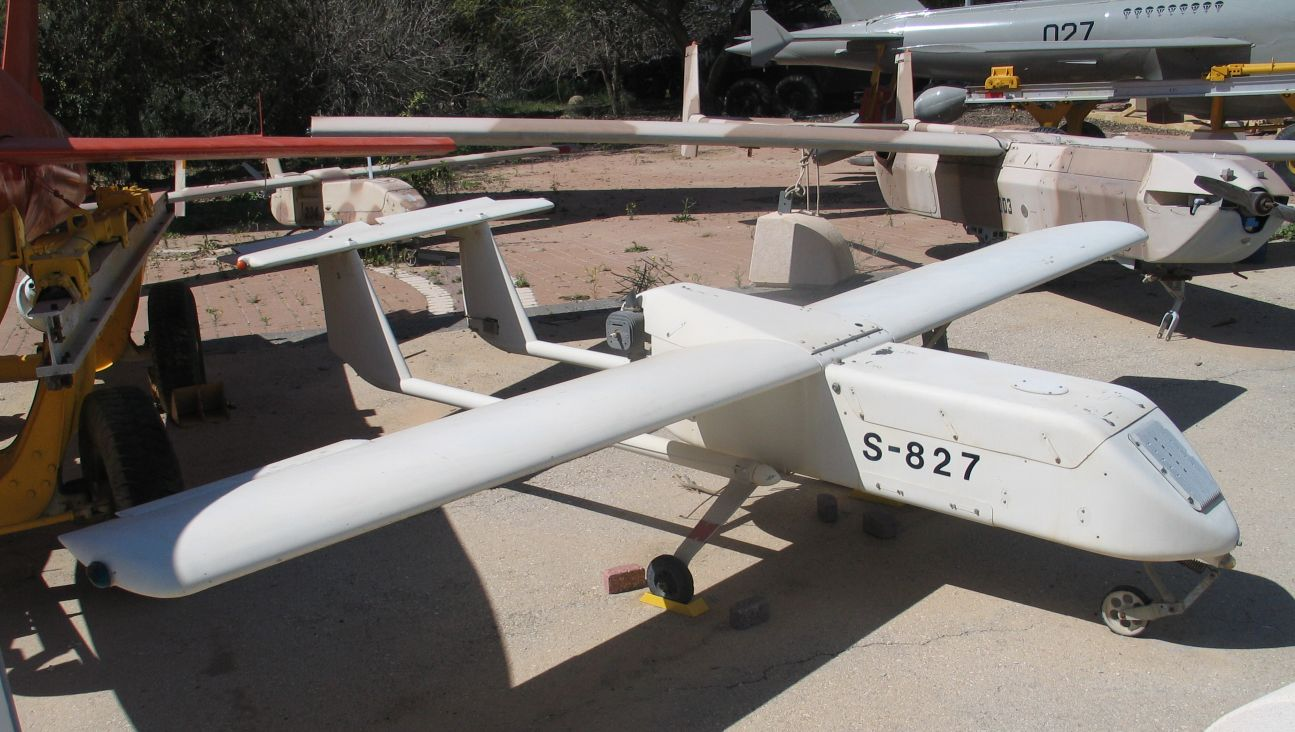
- Mastiff at the Israeli Air Force Museum

General information
- Type: Reconnaissance UAV
- National origin: Israel
- Manufacturer: Tadiran Electronic Systems

The Tadiran Mastiff is a battlefield unmanned aerial vehicle (UAV) built by Tadiran Electronic Industries of Israel. It is regarded by some military historians as the world's first modern military surveillance drone.

== Design and development ==
The Mastiff first flew in 1973. It featured a data-link system and miniaturized electronics that fed live and high-resolution video coverage of the targeted area to operators. It is thus seen by some as the first modern surveillance UAV. The combination of its long flight endurance of over seven hours and real-time video streaming gave Israeli forces unprecedented depth of coverage, speed of information delivery and on-station surveillance time.

The Mastiff was powered by a German-made Limbach Flugmotoren two-cylinder, two-stroke motor with thrust generated by a two-blade pusher propeller manufactured by Propeller Engineering & Duplicating, Inc. of San Clemente, California, USA.

Following the 1973 Yom Kippur War, the Israeli Defence Forces (IDF) introduced an operational requirement to give field commanders the ability to look "over the hill". The requirements were for a vehicle that would be able to carry a 10 kilograms (22 lb) payload to ranges of 30 to 50 kilometres (19 to 31 mi).

Tadiran started developing the Mastiff Mini Remote Piloted Vehicle (RPV) after being approached by a group of entrepreneurs who were looking for Tadiran to provide the Mastiff radio command.

The programme was also sold to the United States Navy with deployments aboard aircraft carriers and the RPV squadron at Camp Talega (within Marine Corps Base Camp Pendleton) in Southern California. The Marine Corps'VMUT-2 employed it from 1984 to 1986.

Three generations of the Mastiff developed by Tadiran were in operational use by the IDF. They performed numerous operational missions; the most well known of these was flown during the first Lebanon war, when Yasser Arafat was viewed by the Mastiff video camera.

== Previous Operators ==
Israel

- Israel Army

Singapore

- Republic of Singapore Air Force

United States

- United States Navy

== Specifications ==
General characteristics

- Crew: None
- Capacity: 37 kg (81 lb) payload
- Length: 3.3 m (10 ft 10 in)
- Wingspan: 4.25 m (13 ft 11 in)
- Height: 0.89 m (2 ft 11 in)
- Empty weight: 72 kg (170 lb)
- Gross weight: 138 kg (304 lb)
- Powerplant: 1 × piston engine

Performance

- Maximum speed: 185 km/h (115 mph, 100 kn)
- Endurance: 7 hours 30 minutes
- Service ceiling: 4,480 m (14,700 ft)

== See also ==
Aircraft of comparable role, configuration, and era

- IAI Scout
