= Unmanned aerial vehicles in the United States military =

US industry information

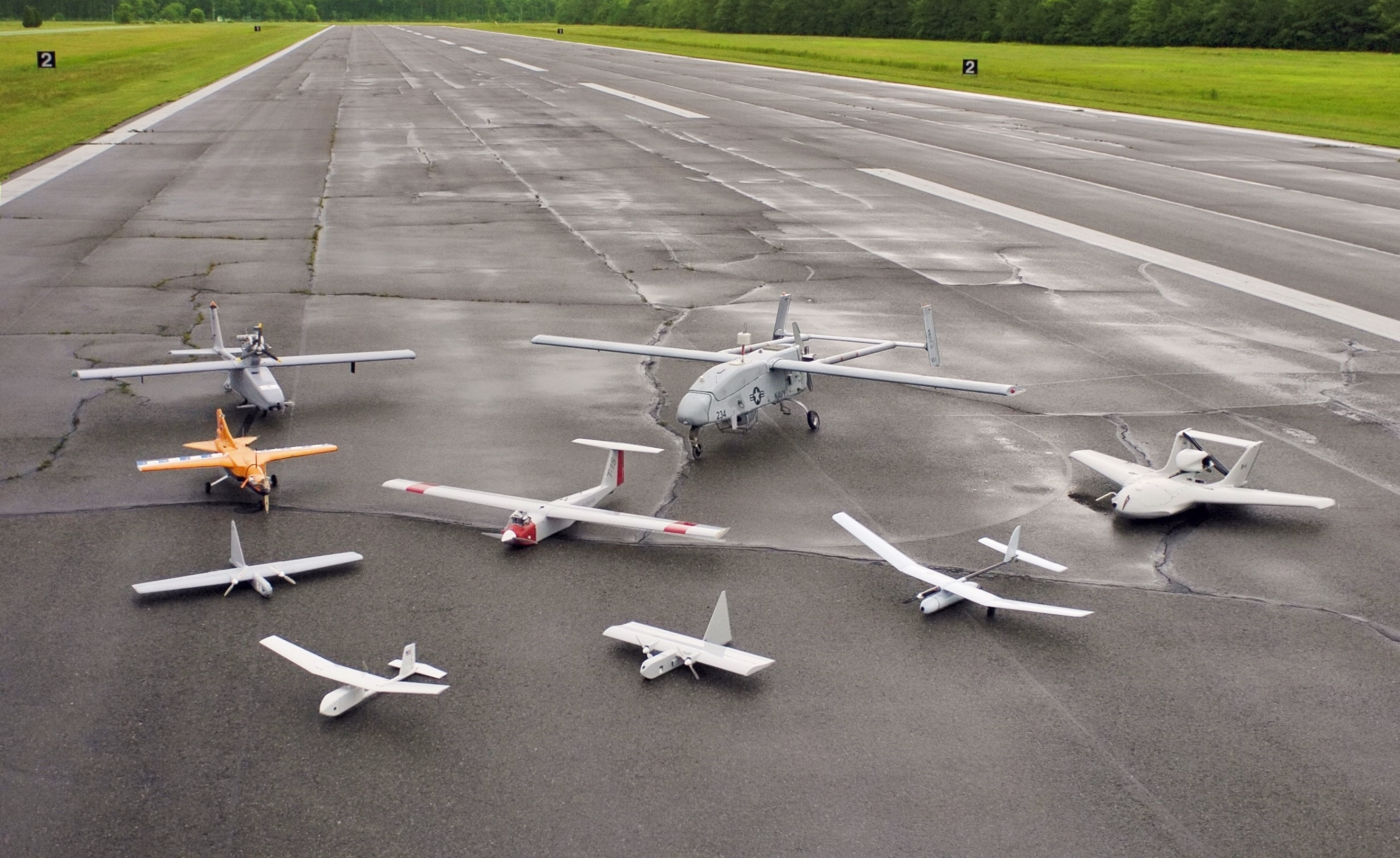
United States unmanned aerial vehicles demonstrators in 2005

The United States military operates a large number of unmanned aerial vehicles (UAVs, also known as Unmanned Aircraft Systems [UAS]). As of 2014 these were known to include 7,362 RQ-11 Ravens; 990 AeroVironment Wasp IIIs; 1,137 AeroVironment RQ-20 Pumas; 306 RQ-16 T-Hawk small UAS systems; 246 MQ-1 Predators; MQ-1C Gray Eagles; 126 MQ-9 Reapers; 491 RQ-7 Shadows; and 33 RQ-4 Global Hawk large systems.

The military role of unmanned aircraft systems is growing at unprecedented rates. In 2005, tactical- and theater-level unmanned aircraft alone had flown over 100,000 flight hours in support of Operation Enduring Freedom and Operation Iraqi Freedom, organized under Task Force Liberty in Afghanistan and Task Force ODIN in Iraq. Throughout the US missions in Iraq, Afghanistan, and Iran rapid improvements in technology enabled steadily increasing capabilities to be placed on smaller airframes. Throughout those campaigns, further advances continued to contribute to a large increase in the number of unmanned systems being deployed on the battlefield. This trend continues following American withdrawals from the Middle East and Central Asia.

The first use of armed UAVs was in 2001, in which an MQ-1 Predator was used to carry anti-tank missiles into Afghanistan, controlled by the Central Intelligence Agency. Until 2006, flight hours by UAVs were not logged, though the DoD now states that millions of UAV flight hours have been logged. As the capabilities grow for all types of unmanned systems, states continue to subsidize their research and development, leading to further advances enabling them to perform a multitude of missions.

UAVs no longer perform solely intelligence, surveillance, and reconnaissance missions, although these still remain their predominant tasks. Their roles have expanded to include electronic attack, drone strikes, suppression or destruction of enemy air defense, network node or communications relay, combat search and rescue, and derivations of these themes. These unmanned systems range in cost from a few thousand dollars to tens of millions of dollars, with aircraft weighing from less than one pound (0.45 kg) to over 40,000 pounds (18,000 kg).

== Classifications by the United States military ==
The modern concept of U.S. military UAVs is to have the various aircraft systems work together in support of personnel on the ground. The integration scheme is described in terms of a "Tier" system and is used by military planners to designate the various individual aircraft elements in an overall usage plan for integrated operations. The Tiers do not refer to specific models of aircraft but rather roles for which various models and their manufacturers competed. The U.S. Air Force and the U.S. Marine Corps each has its own tier system, and the two systems are themselves not integrated.

== List of U.S. military UAVs ==
Former

- ADM-21 Quail
- AQM-60 Kingfisher
- AQM-91 Firefly
- A160 Hummingbird
- CQ-24A K-MAX
- D-21
- FQM-151 Pointer
- MQ-1 Predator
- MQ-5 Hunter
- MQ-8B Fire Scout
- QU-22 Pave Eagle
- RQ-2 Pioneer
- RQ-3 DarkStar
- RQ-14 Dragon Eye
- RQ-16 T-Hawk
- SD-2 Overseer
- SD-3 Snooper
- SD-4 Swallow
- SD-5 Osprey
- X-7
- X-45
- X-47B
- YQM-94 B-Gull
- Aequare
- Desert Hawk
- Interstate TDR
- Maveric
- Naval Research Laboratory flyrt
- Northrop Grumman Tern
- Polecat
- Project Gorgon

Current

- MQ-1 Predator
- MQ-1C Gray Eagle
- MQ-4C Triton
- MQ-8C Fire Scout
- MQ-9 Reaper
- MQ-19 Aerosonde
- MQ-20 Avenger
- RQ-4 Global Hawk
- RQ-7 Shadow
- RQ-11 Raven
- RQ-12 Wasp
- RQ-15 Neptune
- RQ-20 Puma
- RQ-21 Blackjack
- RQ-170 Sentinel
- RQ-180
- CQ-10 Snowgoose
- CQM-121 Pave Tiger
- Model 147
- T20
- Altius-600
- Snipe NAV
- Switchblade
- Black Hornet Nano
- Northrop Grumman Bat
- Coyote
- Dyzne Ultra
- Phoenix Ghost
- Low-cost Uncrewed Combat Attack System (LUCAS)
- ScanEagle
- Stalker
- TRV-150C

In development

- MQ-25 Stingray
- FQ-42 Vengeance
- FQ-44 Fury
- YFQ-48 Talon Blue
- XQ-58 Valkyrie
- XQ-67A
- XRQ-73 SHEPARD
- MH-6 MELB
- Horus A
- Vectis

== Use in the War on Terror ==
The Obama administration announced the deployment of 30,000 new troops in Afghanistan in December 2009, but there was already an increase of attacks by unmanned Predator UAVs against Taliban and al-Qaeda militants in Afghanistan and Pakistan's tribal areas, one of which probably killed a key member of al-Qaeda. However, neither Osama bin Laden nor Ayman al-Zawahiri was the likely target, according to reports. According to a report of the New America Foundation, armed UAV strikes had dramatically increased under President Obama, even before his deployment decision.

There were 43 such attacks between January and October 2009. The report draws on what it deems to be "credible" local and national media stories about the attacks. This can be compared to a total of 34 in all of 2008, which was President Bush's last full year in office. Between 2006 and 2009, UAV-launched missiles allegedly had killed between 750 and 1,000 people in Pakistan, according to the report.

Of these, about 20 people were said to be leaders of al-Qaeda, Taliban, and associated groups. Overall, 66 to 68 percent of the people killed were militants, and 31 to 33 percent were civilians. U.S. officials disputed the percentage for civilians. The U.S. Air Force has recently begun referring to larger UAS as Remotely Piloted Aircraft (RPA), such as Predator, Reaper, and Global Hawk, to highlight the fact that these systems are always controlled by a human operator at some location.

CIA-ordered drone strikes were ended by President Obama, who transferred control entirely to the military under a separate legal authority. President Trump reversed this decision in 2017.

=== UAVs and Morality ===
Dr. Peter Lee is a Portsmouth University Lecturer in military and leadership ethics specializing in the ethics and ethos of remotely piloted aircraft. In his paper, Rights, Wrongs and Drones: Remote Warfare, Ethics and the Challenge of Just War, he claims that no weapon system has prompted more debate, speculation and opposition since the nuclear controversies of the 1980s (pg 21). As the issues of individual rights, legality and morality have advanced over a decade, the moral arguments surrounding war have shifted from state-centric to focused on the individuals involved in war and the ethics of their actions. This may have significant consequences for the moral component of fighting power as understood by western powers.

In an article published by NPR titled "The Legal and Moral Issues of Drone Use", Amitai Etzioni, professor of International Affairs and Sociology at George Washington University, states that while drones have been successful in fighting Al-Qaida, and Taliban members, 24% of kills have been civilian casualties. Etzioni postulates that civilian casualties have given rise to increased violence around the Afghan-Pakistan border resulting in an uptick of suicide attacks. Yet, she considers drone strikes to be “cleaner instruments of war” than special ops, or bombings, justifying the use of them in a utilitarian sense.

For example, when the leader of the Pakistani Taliban was killed by a drone strike, his father-in-law and wife were also killed. During the Obama administration, the state department's top lawyer, Harold Koh, argued that the U.S. has the authority under international law to defend its citizens from terrorist organizations by using lethal force and targeting leaders of Al-Qaida and the Taliban.

The first Committee of the UN General Assembly saw its very first side event on Unmanned Aerial Vehicles, on Friday, 23 October 2015. According to the UN, an increasing number of countries and non-state actors have shown interest in the use of both commercial and military use of drones. One of the panel experts, Mr. Zwijnenburg concluded the meeting by stating that clarity surrounding drone strikes is required, to provide the international community with a legal interpretation of international humanitarian laws and frameworks related to targeted drone attacks and the civilian killings that may result.

=== Armed attacks by U.S. UAVs ===
MQ-1 Predator UAVs armed with Hellfire missiles have been used by the U.S. as platforms for hitting ground targets. Armed Predators were first used in late 2001 from bases in Pakistan and Uzbekistan, mostly aimed at assassinating high-profile individuals (terrorist leaders, etc.) inside Afghanistan. Since then, there have been many reported cases of such attacks taking place in Afghanistan, Pakistan, Yemen, and Somalia. The advantage of using an unmanned vehicle rather than a manned aircraft in such cases is to avoid a diplomatic embarrassment should the aircraft be shot down and the pilots captured, since the bombings take place in countries deemed friendly and without the official permission of those countries.

A Predator based in a neighboring Arab country was used to kill suspected al-Qaeda terrorists in Yemen on 3 November 2002. This marked the first use of an armed Predator as an attack aircraft outside of a theater of war such as Afghanistan.

The U.S. has claimed that the Predator strikes killed at least nine senior al-Qaeda leaders and dozens of lower-ranking operatives, depleting its operational tier in what U.S. officials described as the most serious disruption of al-Qaeda since 2001. It was claimed that the Predator strikes took such a toll on al-Qaeda that militants began turning violently on one another out of confusion and distrust. A senior U.S. counter-terrorism official said: "They have started hunting down people who they think are responsible [for security breaches]. People are showing up dead, or disappearing."

By October 2009, the CIA claimed to have killed more than half of the 20 most wanted al-Qaeda terrorist suspects in targeted killings using UAVs. By May 2010, counter-terrorism officials said that UAV strikes in the Pakistani tribal areas had killed more than 500 militants since 2008 and no more than 30 (5%) nearby civilians – mainly family members who lived and traveled with the targets. UAVs linger overhead after a strike, in some cases for hours, to enable the CIA to count the bodies and attempt to determine which, if any, are civilians. A Pakistani intelligence officer gave a higher estimate of civilian casualties, saying 20% of total deaths were civilians or non-combatants.

In February 2013, U.S. Senator Lindsey Graham stated that 4,756 people have been killed by U.S. UAVs.

CIA officials became concerned in 2008, that targets in Pakistan were being tipped off to pending U.S. UAV strikes by Pakistani intelligence, when the U.S. requested Pakistani permission prior to launching UAV-based attacks. The Bush administration therefore decided in August 2008 to abandon the practice of obtaining Pakistani government permission before launching missiles from UAVs, and in the next six months the CIA carried out at least 38 Predator strikes in northwest Pakistan, compared with 10 in 2006 and 2007 combined.

One issue with using armed drones to attack human targets is the size of the bombs being used and the relative lack of discrimination of the 100 lb (45 kg) Hellfire, which was designed to eliminate tanks and attack bunkers. Smaller weapons such as Raytheon's Griffin and Pyros are being developed as a less indiscriminate alternative, and development is underway on the still smaller US Navy-developed Spike missile. The payload-limited Predator A can also be armed with six Griffin missiles, as opposed to only two of the much-heavier Hellfires.

=== Public opinion in the US (military use) ===
In 2013, a Fairleigh Dickinson University poll found that 48% of American voters believe it is "illegal for the U.S. government to target its own citizens living abroad with drone attacks." In the same poll, however, a majority of voters approved of the U.S. military and the CIA using UAVs to carry out attacks abroad “on people and other targets deemed a threat to the U.S.”.

There are a number of critics of the use of UAVs to track and kill terrorists and militants. A major criticism of drone strikes is that they result in excessive collateral damage. However, others maintain that drones "allow for a much closer review and much more selective targeting process than do other instruments of warfare" and are subject to Congressional oversight. Like any military technology, armed UAVs will kill people, combatants and innocents alike, thus "the main turning point concerns the question of whether we should go to war at all."

== Infrastructure ==
In 2012, the USAF trained more UAV pilots than ordinary jet fighter pilots for the first time. Unlike other UAVs, the Predator was armed with Hellfire missiles so that it can terminate the target that it locates. This was done after Predators sighted Osama bin Laden multiple times but could not do anything about it other than send back images. In addition, the Predator is capable of orchestrating attacks by pointing lasers at the targets. This is important, as it puts a robot in a position to set off an attack. Their overall success is apparent because from June 2005 to June 2006 alone, Predators carried out 2,073 missions and participated in 242 separate raids.

In contrast to the Predator, which is remotely piloted via satellites, the Global Hawk operates virtually autonomously. The user merely hits the button for ‘take off’ and for ‘land’, while the UAV gets directions via GPS and reports back with a live feed. Global Hawks have the capability to fly from San Francisco and map out the entire state of Maine before having to return.

In addition, some UAVs have become so small that they can be launched from one's hand and maneuvered through the street. These UAVs, known as Ravens, are especially useful in urban areas, such as Iraq, in order to discover insurgents and potential ambushes the next block up. UAVs are especially useful because they can fly for days at a time. Insurgents in the open for more than a few minutes at a time fear UAVs locating them.

In the U.S., thousands of civilian UAV operators work for contractors, piloting and maintaining UAVs. Up to four UAVs and about 400 to 500 pilot and ground support personnel are required for a single 24-hour-coverage combat air patrol (CAP). A 2011 study by the Air Force School of Aerospace Medicine indicated that nearly 50% of spy UAV operators suffer from high stress. The president of a civilian UAV operators' union, the Association of Unmanned Operation (AUO), cited long working hours and decreasing wages as U.S. involvement in wars in Iraq and Afghanistan was reduced and as a result of the U.S. government's budget sequestration.

Given the increasing military use of cyber attacks against Microsoft software, the United States Armed Forces have moved towards Linux ground control software.

== Scale of use ==
An August 2013, Brookings Institution study reported that in the U.S. Air Force there were approximately 1,300 remotely piloted aircraft (RPA) pilots, 8.5 percent of total Air Force pilots, up from 3.3 percent in 2008. The study indicated that the U.S. military's combat air patrol (CAP) daily missions requirement is growing at a faster pace than RPA pilots can be trained, with an attrition rate during RPA flight screening being three times that of traditional pilots and a 13% lower promotion rate to Major than other officers.

As of January 2014, the U.S. military operates a large number of unmanned aerial systems: 7,362 RQ-11 Ravens; 990 AeroVironment Wasp IIIs; 1,137 AeroVironment RQ-20 Pumas; and 306 RQ-16 T-Hawk small UAS systems and 246 Predators and MQ-1C Gray Eagles; 126 MQ-9 Reapers; 491 RQ-7 Shadows; and 33 RQ-4 Global Hawk large systems.

As of mid-2014, the U.S. Air Force is training more drone pilots than fighter and bomber pilots combined.

== Research and development ==
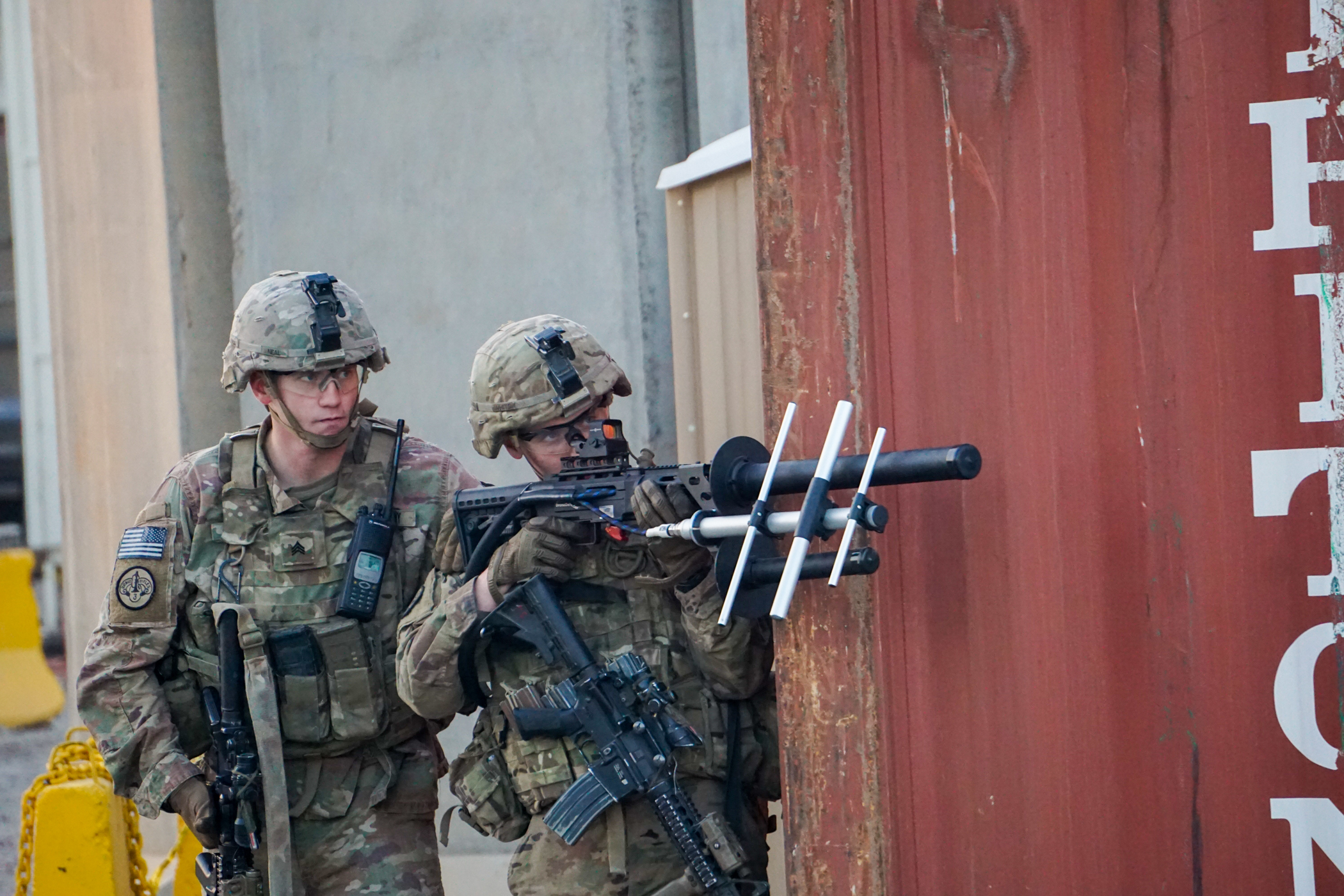
An example of drone countermeasures

At the center of the American military's continued UAV research is the MQ-X, which builds upon the capabilities of the Reaper and Predator UAVs. As currently conceived, the MQ-X would be a stealthier and faster fighter-plane sized UAV capable of any number of missions: high-performance surveillance; attack options, including retractable cannons and bomb or missile payloads; and cargo capacity.

Development costs for American military UAVs, as with most military programs, have tended to overrun their initial estimates. This is mostly due to changes in requirements during development and a failure to leverage UAV development programs over multiple armed services. This has caused United States Navy UAV programs to increase in cost from 0% to 5%, while United States Air Force UAV programs have increased from 60% to 284%.

The USAF said in 2012 that it will focus on development of UAVs capable of collaborative networking with manned aircraft in "buddy attacks" or flying as standalone systems.

The U.S. Defense Department's Defense Advanced Research Projects Agency (DARPA) planned in 2014 to award grants and contracts up to $5.5 million each, for its Fast Lightweight Autonomy Program (FLAP) program, which specifies UAVs capable of traveling 60 feet per second (18 m/s) to include autonomy algorithms for quickly and autonomously navigating indoor obstacles and learning from past travels.

== See also ==
- 82nd Aerial Targets Squadron
- Civilian casualties from U.S. drone strikes
- Drone strike
- Unmanned Aerial Vehicle Battlelab, U.S. Air Force facility
- Use of UAVs by the CIA
