= Naval Research Laboratory Flyrt =

Unmanned aerial vehicle

Flyrt
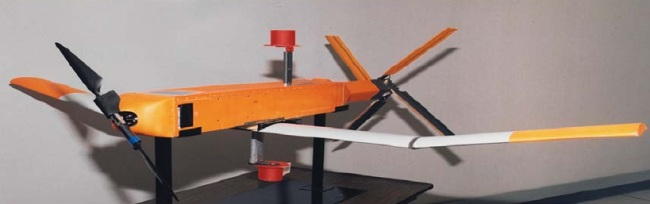

General information
- Type: Radar decoy drone
- National origin: United States
- Manufacturer: Naval Research Laboratory
- Primary user: United States Navy
- Number built: 13

History
- First flight: 9 September 1993

The Naval Research Laboratory Flyrt, or Flying Radar Target, was a small electric-powered unmanned aerial vehicle developed by the United States Naval Research Laboratory to serve as an expendable radar decoy for the defense of United States Navy ships. Tested in the fall of 1993, it was considered successful but was not ordered into production.

== Design and development ==
Begun in 1991, the Flyrt program was intended to produce an expendable decoy drone, not requiring any new aboardship infrastructure, for the defense of warships against radar-guided antiship missiles. It produced a drone that was of conventional configuration, having a low-mounted, folding wing and a cruciform tail section; an electric motor was mounted in the nose of the aircraft. Launch was via a rocket booster, providing 1.6 seconds of thrust, from the Mark 137 launcher of the Mark 36 SRBOC system; the use of the Mark 36 launcher put a constraint on the possible size of the drone, which was designed to compact into a package the size of a standard NATO Mark 36 chaff rocket. The tail fins would unfold immediately on launch, while the wing would deploy and motor start after burnout as the aircraft coasted to the apogee of a ballistic trajectory. The expendable Flyrt carried a radio repeater with two antennae for spoofing enemy radar signals.

== Operational history ==
Following a series of ballistic tests to verify compatibility of the launcher, the Flyrt trial program moved to full-scale tests of the vehicle, with the drone's first flight coming on 9 September 1993. Thirteen drones were constructed for the program, conducted at the NRL's Chesapeake Bay Detachment, which was considered successful; however, no production was undertaken.

== Specifications ==
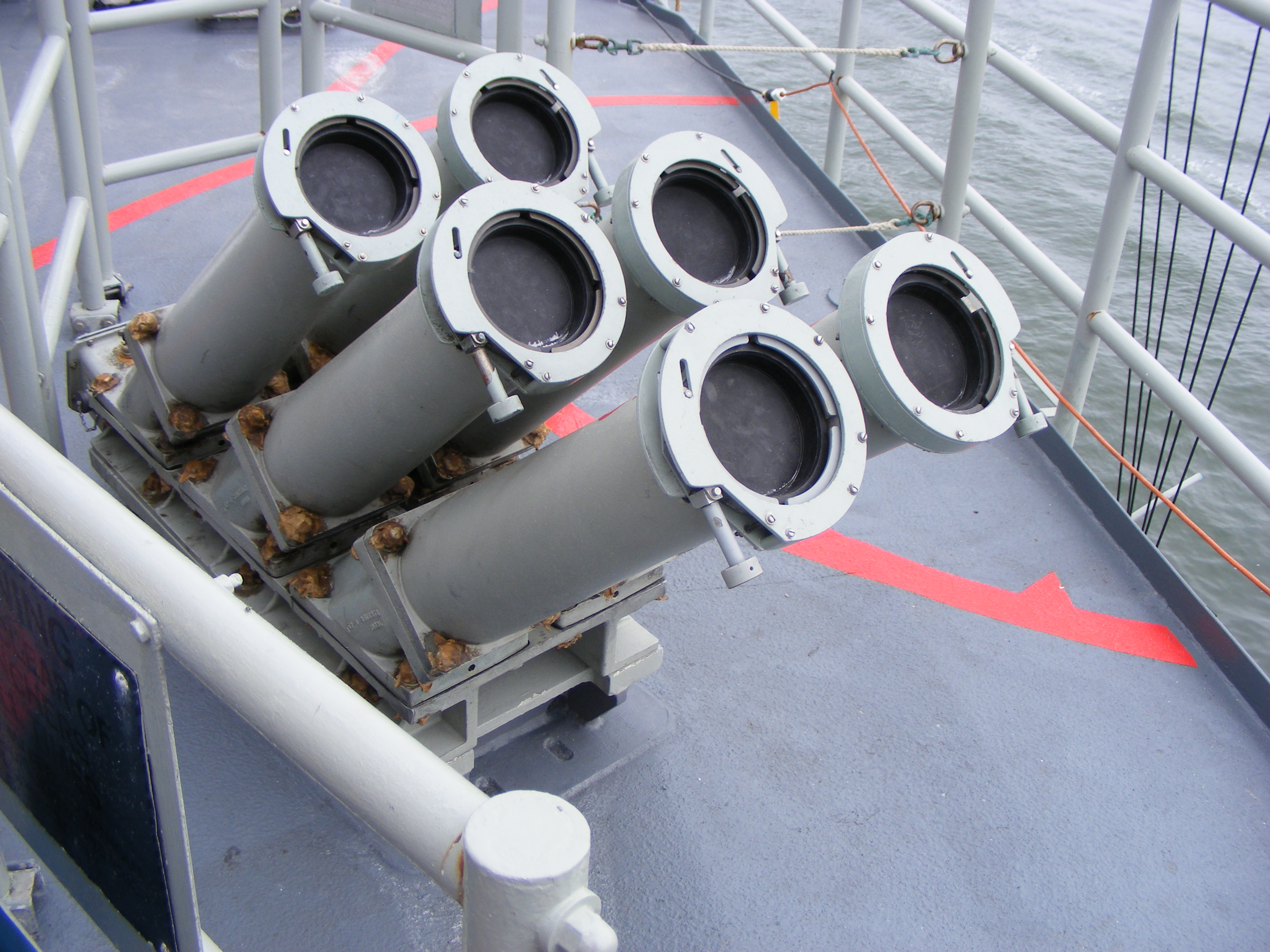
The Super RBOC launcher used for FLYRT

Data from Parsch 2006

General characteristics

- Crew: None
- Capacity: 25 pounds (11 kg) payload
- Wingspan: 8 ft (2.4 m)
- Gross weight: 132 lb (60 kg) including booster

Performance

- Maximum speed: 80 mph (130 km/h, 70 kn)

== See also ==
Aircraft of comparable role, configuration, and era

- ADM-20 Quail
- ADM-160 MALD
- XSM-74

Related lists

- List of military aircraft of the United States
- List of unmanned aerial vehicles
