= Pate Museum of Transportation =

- Location within Texas
- Established: 2 August 1969
- Dissolved: 25 December 2009
- Location: Cresson, Texas
- Coordinates: 32.5725°N 97.6027°W
- Type: Transportation museum
- Founders: A.M. "Aggie" Pate, Jr.
- Website: Official website (Archived)

The Pate Museum of Transportation was a transportation museum located in Cresson, Texas.

== History ==
=== Background ===
A.M. "Aggie" Pate Jr. acquired the first car in 1948 in high school. After becoming president of Panther Oil and Grease in 1965, he began planning for an automobile museum. The original idea included a vintage gas station and was called Gasoline Alley, but the scope expanded to include all forms of transportation.

=== Establishment ===
The main building was opened on 2 August 1969 and three months later the museum had 26 cars.

The museum received the minesweeper USS Admiral Vosseller (MSB-5) on loan from the U.S. Navy in 1973. The following year it opened an exhibition about lighter-than-air aircraft. The year after that, it displayed the first Soviet space exhibit in the United States.

Pate died in 1988 and, by the late 1990s, the former site of the museum was redeveloped into housing.

The U.S. Air Force began removing aircraft from the collection in 2003 after their condition deteriorated and the museum could not afford the cost of repairs. (Note: An F-105 and T-33 went to the Historic Aviation Memorial Museum, an RF-84 to the American Airpower Museum, an F-86 to Barnes Air National Guard Base and a C-117 to San Angelo.)

=== Closure ===
Due to a lack of funding and reduced attendance, the museum was forced to close on 24 December 2009. The following June an auction of 43 vehicles was held.

The minesweeping boat was scrapped in mid-2011 after it was determined to have deteriorated beyond salvage.

== Former collection ==
=== Aircraft ===
- Douglas C-117C
- Fairchild C-119F Flying Boxcar
- Grumman F9F-8 Cougar
- Grumman HU-16B Albatross
- Hiller OH-23B Raven
- Hiller OH-23B Raven
- Kaman HH-43B Huskie
- Lockheed T-33
- McDonnell F-101B Voodoo
- McDonnell F-4D Phantom II
- North American F-86H Sabre
- North American T-28C Trojan
- Piasecki CH-21B Workhorse
- Republic F-105D Thunderchief
- Republic RF-84F Thunderflash
- Vought YF-8C Crusader

=== Other ===
- AGM-28 Hound Dog
- CIM-10 Bomarc
- GAM-72 Quail
- Railcar Ellsmere II
- USS Admiral Vosseller (MSB-5)

== Events ==
The museum held an annual open house and a swap meet.

== See also ==
- List of transportation museums
