= Republic SD-4 Swallow =

Canceled reconnaissance drone project

SD-4 Swallow

General information
- Type: Reconnaissance drone
- National origin: United States
- Manufacturer: Republic Aviation
- Primary user: United States Army
- Number built: 0

The Republic SD-4 Swallow was an early high-speed reconnaissance drone developed by Republic Aviation for the United States Army. Intended for use by the U.S. Army Signal Corps to target tactical ballistic missiles, it was cancelled before the first prototype could be completed, and did not see operational service.

== Design and development ==
Contracts were awarded by the U.S. Army in 1960 for development of a high-speed, long-range reconnaissance drone to gather targeting information for the Army's tactical ballistic missile force; competing designs for the requirement were developed by Republic Aviation, which proposed a 'clean-sheet' aircraft given the designation SD-4 Swallow, and Fairchild Aircraft, which developed a variant of the Bull Goose decoy missile as the SD-5 Osprey.

Given the full designation AN/USD-4 for its overall system, the SD-4 was of tailless delta configuration, with power provided by a Pratt & Whitney J60 turbojet, the military version of the civilian JT12 engine; two Arrow 2 jet-assisted takeoff-type rocket boosters allowing for zero-length launch from a specially designed trailer.

In a similar fashion to Republic's smaller SD-3 drone, the Swallow was equipped with an interchangeable nose section allowing for aerial photography, infrared photography, or radar systems to be installed depending on mission needs. Capable of operating in any weather conditions, recovery following the completion of the SD-4's mission was to be by parachute.

Before any flight test vehicles were constructed, the program was cancelled in January of 1961 due to cost constraints.

== Specifications ==
Data from Parsch 2004

General characteristics

- Crew: None
- Length: 30 ft 5 in (9.27 m)
- Wingspan: 11 ft 6 in (3.51 m)
- Gross weight: 3,500 lb (1,588 kg)
- Powerplant: 1 × Pratt & Whitney J60-3 turbojet, 2,900 lbf (13 kN) thrust

PerformanceNewcome states the SD-4 and SD-5 were subsonic.

- Maximum speed: Mach 1.5
- Range: 300 mi (480 km, 260 nmi)
- Service ceiling: 60,000 ft (18,000 m)

== See also ==
- Joint Electronics Type Designation System – Unclassified designation system for United States military electronic equipment

Aircraft of comparable role, configuration, and era

- Fairchild SD-5 Osprey

Related lists

- List of military aircraft of the United States
- List of military electronics of the United States
- List of unmanned aerial vehicles
