= XSM-73 Goose =

Cruise missile

XSM-73 Bull Goose
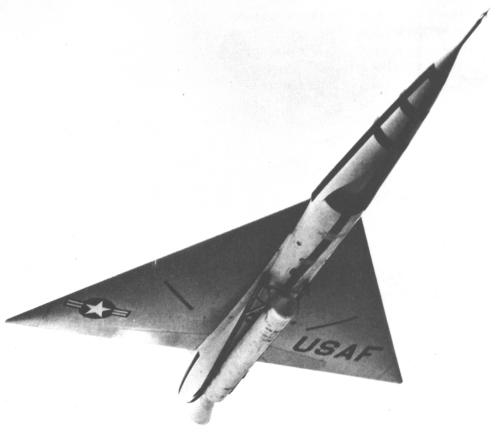
- XSM-73 at Launch
- Type: Cruise Missile

Service history
- In service: Cancelled

Production history
- Manufacturer: Fairchild
- Produced: 1957

Specifications
- Mass: 8,945 lb (4,057 kg) including booster
- Length: 33 ft 6 in (10.21 m)
- Height: 7 ft 1 in (2.16 m)
- Wingspan: 24 ft 5 in (7.44 m)
- Warhead: None
- Propellant: Thiokol solid-propellant rocket; 50,000 lbf (222 kN) thrust for 3 seconds.
- Operational range: 4,773 mi (7,681 km)
- Flight ceiling: 50,000 ft (15,200 m)
- Flight altitude: 50,000 ft (15,200 m) at 3,701 lb (1,679 kg) at Mach 0.85
- Maximum speed: Mach 0.85
- Guidance system: Autopilot integrated with a rate integrating gyroscope pre-programmed to turn the SM-73.
- Launch platform: Zero-length ground launcher.

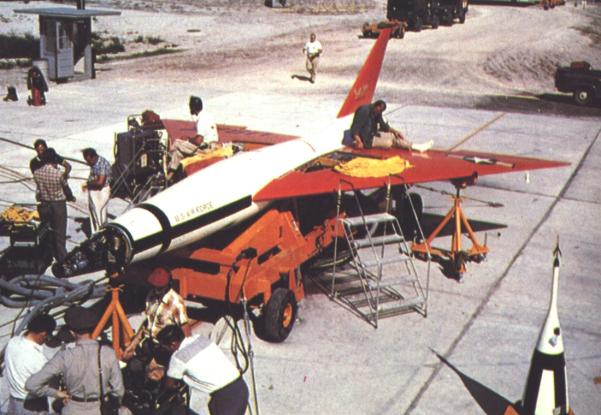
XSM-73 being prepared for flight.

The Fairchild SM-73 (originally Bull Goose) was a planned sub-sonic, jet-powered, long-range, ground-launched decoy cruise missile. XSM-73 was the designation for the development version. Development began in 1952 with conceptual studies and ended when the program was canceled in 1958 after 15 test flights but before any operational deployment. The operational concept was to base squadrons of XM-73s at various locations in the United States and if necessary launch the aircraft as part of a strategic bomber attack. The aircraft would fly autonomously under inertial guidance towards the target area, using radar reflectors and electronic countermeasures to imitate American bombers and thus confuse and saturate enemy air defenses. The program was cancelled because the missile was not able to simulate a B-52 bomber on radar.

== Development ==
Starting in December 1952, Fairchild began concept studies for a ground-launched long range decoy missile that could simulate strategic bombers on radar.

In March 1953, the United States Air Force released General Operational Requirement (GOR) 16 which called for a long range decoy missile to increase the effectiveness of Strategic Air Command bombers by confusing and saturating an air defense system. Multiple SM-73 missiles would be ground-launched from Strategic Air Command bases located in the continental United States. The requirement was that fifty percent of the deployed SM-73 missiles could be launched within the first hour after a launch order and the remaining missiles could be launched within one more hour. The requirement called for 85 percent of the decoy missiles to arrive at the target area within 115 nm (185 km). The SM-73 was to fly 4,000 nm (7,408 km) at speed of at least Mach 0.85 at an operating altitude of 50,000 ft (15,240 m) with a payload of 500 lb (227 kg). After flying 2,500 nm (4,650 km), the SM-73' would simulate the performance of the B-47 Stratojet or B-52 Stratofortress over the final 1,500 nm (2,780 km) of flight.

Study contracts were awarded to Convair and Fairchild in July 1954 by the United States Air Force under the project designation MX-2223.

The Fairchild MX-2223 design called for a non-metallic fuselage with swept wings and a v-tail. Radar reflectors were located in the fuselage and on pods positioned on the wing tips to simulate the radar return of a bomber.

== Design ==
In December 1955, Fairchild was awarded a contract to develop Weapon System 123A which included the SM-73 missile. American Machine and Foundry Company was responsible for the ground equipment, Ramo-Woodridge Corporation was responsible for electronic equipment, and Paul Omohundro Co who was responsible for airframe elements.

Two engine contracts were awarded by the USAF in November 1954 to minimize development risk.

Each engine was in the 2,450 lbf (10.9 kN) thrust class with a thrust to weight ratio goal of 10:1. General Electric was awarded a contract for the development of the General Electric J85 and Fairchild was awarded a contract for the competing engine, the Fairchild J83. Fairchild proposed a lightweight engine of conventional design.

The proposed General Electric engine had a more advanced design, involving more risk, but having a higher thrust to weight ratio. The XSM-73 was powered by the Fairchild J83 on all test flights but was also capable of using the General Electric J85. The Fairchild J83 was operating by early 1957.

Like the MX-2223 design, the SM-73 utilized a non-metallic fiberglass fuselage. The swept wing of the MX-2223 design evolved to a fiberglass 52°delta wing. A Thiokol solid-propellant rocket booster was used to launch the SM-73 to a speed of 300 knots (345 mph).

Cruise speed for the SM-73 was 488 knots (562 mph). The SM-73 had a fuel capacity of 803 gal (3,040 L) of JP-4. This fuel was stored in 10 fuselage and six wing tanks.

An autopilot used a Rate integrating gyroscope for directional control. The rate integrating gyroscope could be pre-programmed to turn the SM-73. Pitch and roll control were provided by elevons either operating in phase or asymmetrically. Yaw control was provided by a rudder. The control system positioned flight controls by sending electrical signals to hydraulic actuators located at each flight control.

The SM-73 was designed to carry radar reflectors and active electronic countermeasures operating in S-band, L-band, and lower frequencies. The SM-73 was not armed.

Funding issues and problems with the fiberglass wing, the booster rocket, and the Fairchild J83 engine delayed testing.

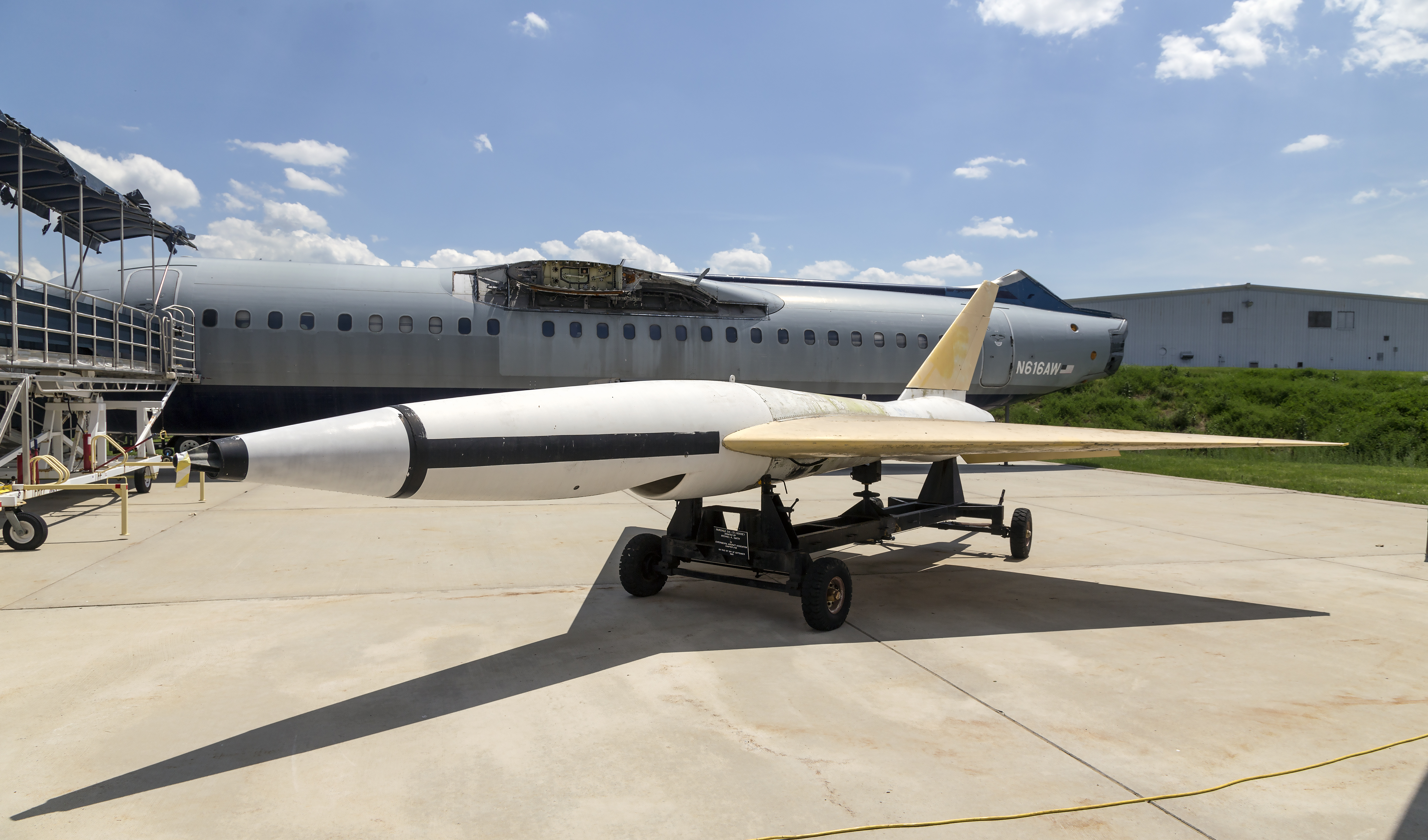
SM-73 at the Hagerstown Aviation Museum

Test and evaluation began in February 1957 with rocket sled tests at Holloman Air Force Base. A B-57 Canberra was modified and used as a flying engine testbed for the Fairchild J83. Testing of the SM-73 then transitioned to Patrick Air Force Base in June 1957. At Patrick Air Force Base, launch complexes 21 and 22 were constructed near the Cape Canaveral Light to support SM-73 testing. Five dummy booster launches and fifteen test flights were flown between March 1957 and December 1958.

The United States Air Force planned to purchase 2,328 operational missiles and 53 missiles for test and evaluation. This would have provided enough missiles for 10 squadrons. Deployment was planned to start in 1961 and be completed by October 1963. Bull Goose bases were initially planned at Duluth Municipal Airport, Minnesota and Ethan Allen Air Force Base, Vermont. Construction of Bull Goose missile sites began in August 1958.

In December 1958 the program was canceled because the missile was not able to simulate a B-52 on radar. The Fairchild J83 engine program was also canceled in November 1958. Total program cost at cancellation was $136.5 million USD.

The SD-5 Osprey reconnaissance drone was developed with the Goose as a basis.

== Variants ==
B-73
Original designation in Bomber sequence
XSM-73
Test and Evaluation prototypes.
SM-73
Production Missile designation.
Gander
Proposed surface-to-surface version capable of carrying a 1 Mt warhead 2,000 miles (3,200 km).

== Operator ==
- United States
  - United States Air Force

== Survivors ==
- XSM-73 located in the Hagerstown Aviation Museum, Hagerstown, Maryland, United States.
- XSM-73 located in the Air Force Space & Missile Museum, Cape Canaveral Space Force Station, Florida, United States
- XSM-73 located in the Research & Development Gallery in the National Museum of the United States Air Force in Dayton, Ohio
- XSM-73 awaiting restoration at the New England Air Museum in Windsor Locks, Connecticut

== See also ==
Aircraft of comparable role, configuration, and era

- ADM-20 Quail
- ADM-141 TALD
- ADM-160 MALD
- AGM-86 ALCM
- BGM-109G Ground Launched Cruise Missile
- MGM-1 Matador
- MGM-13 Mace
- Northrop BQM-74 Chukar
- SM-64 Navaho
- XSM-74

Related lists

- List of military aircraft of the United States
- List of missiles
