= ADM-20 Quail =

American decoy cruise missile

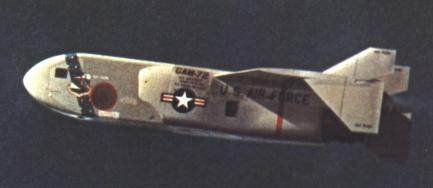
- ADM-20 Quail in flight
- Type: Decoy cruise missile
- Place of origin: United States

Service history
- In service: September 13, 1960

Production history
- Manufacturer: McDonnell Aircraft
- Produced: November 1957

Specifications
- Mass: 1,198 lb (543 kg)
- Length: 12 ft 9 in (3.88 m)
- Height: 2 ft 1 in (0.66 m) (wings folded); 3 ft 3 in (1.02 m) (wings unfolded).
- Wingspan: 2 ft 4 in (0.71 m) (wings folded); 5 ft 4 in (1.65 m) (wings unfolded).
- Warhead: None
- Engine: General Electric J85-GE-7 turbojet; 2,450 lbf (10.9 kN) thrust.
- Operational range: 445 miles (716 km)
- Flight ceiling: 50,000 ft (15,200 m)
- Flight altitude: 50,000 ft (15,200 m).
- Maximum speed: 0.9 Mach
- Guidance system: Autopilot integrated with a rate integrating gyroscope pre-programmed to turn the ADM-20.
- Launch platform: B-52 Stratofortress.

The McDonnell ADM-20 Quail was a subsonic, jet powered, air-launched decoy cruise missile built by McDonnell Aircraft Corporation. The Quail was designed to be launched by the Boeing B-52 Stratofortress strategic bomber and its original United States Air Force designation was GAM-72 (GAM standing for Guided Aircraft Missile).

Quail contained electronics and radar reflectors intended to make it indistinguishable from a B-52 approaching at low altitude. This would force Soviet defenses to divide their missiles and interceptors between multiple targets, reducing the chance that a bomber would be targeted.

Design of an improved version of Quail began in January 1968, with the system being termed the Subsonic Cruise Aircraft Decoy. This program incorporated several significant changes to the starting design before the AGM-86 ALCM was created.

== Development ==
In 1955 the USAF started a major effort to construct decoy missiles. The goal of this effort was to improve the ability of strategic bombers to penetrate air-defense systems. The projects initiated under this effort included the MX-2223, which produced the XSM-73 Goose, a long range ground-launched jet-powered, decoy cruise missile; and MX-2224, which produced the XGAM-71 Buck Duck, an air-launched rocket powered decoy missile to equip the Convair B-36.

The USAF was at the same time developing the XQ-4 as a supersonic target drone to support the Bomarc Missile Program. A requirement was established by the USAF Power Plant Laboratory at Wright-Patterson Air Force Base to support follow-on production of the XQ-4. This requirement called for a small jet engine in the 2,000 lbf (8.9 kN) thrust class with a high thrust-to-weight ratio of 10:1. On November 28, 1954 General Electric was awarded a USAF development contract to construct the XJ-85-GE-1. The USAF designated the XJ85 project MX-2273.

During April 1955, the USAF began a program to develop a short range air-launched decoy missile to simulate the radar cross section of a bomber. On January 18, 1956, the USAF released General Operational Requirement (GOR) 139.

== Design ==
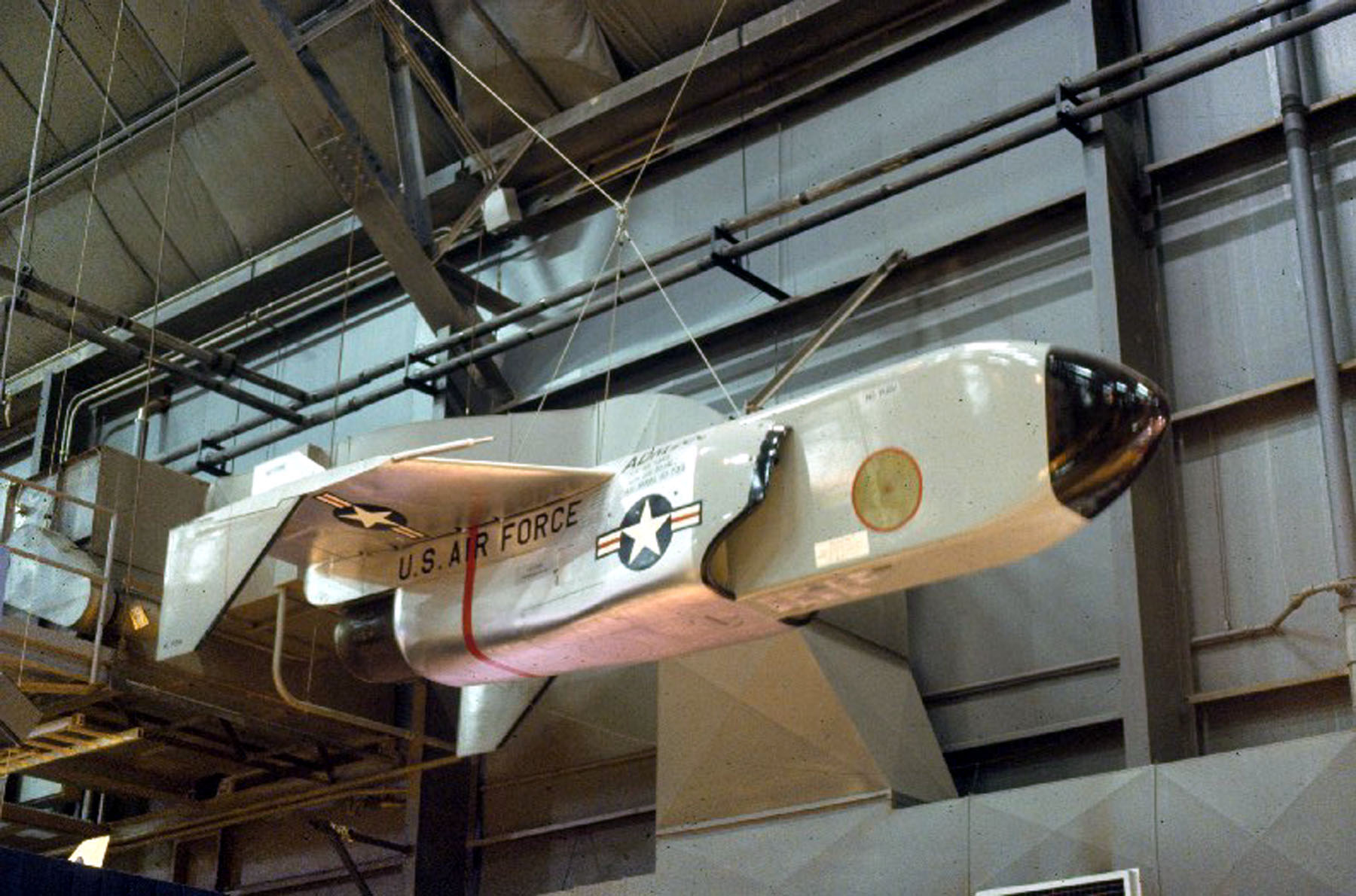
One ADM-20 of USAF Museum.

McDonnell Aircraft Corporation submitted a design which included a cropped-delta-wing decoy constructed largely of fiberglass and carried internally within a B-52. The following month on February 1, 1956, the McDonnell Aircraft Corporation was awarded a contract to develop Weapon System 122A which included the GAM-72 Green Quail missile. In June 1956 General Electric was selected as the engine contractor for the GAM-72. Guidance components were built by Summers Gyroscope and the countermeasures equipment by Ramo-Wooldridge Corporation.

The GAM-72 was designed with a high-mounted delta wing and no horizontal stabilizer. A slab-sided fuselage and two sets of vertical stabilizers contributed to the GAM-72s ability to simulate the radar cross section of a bomber. Initially the GAM-72 was powered by a YJ85-GE-1. This jet engine produced 1,900-2,100 lbf (8.5-9.3 kN) of thrust with a thrust-to-weight ratio goal of (4.6:1) to (5:1).

The GAM-72s guidance system could be pre-programmed on the ground to execute two turns and one speed change during a flight time of 45 to 55 minutes. Flight duration depended on altitude. The GAM-72 was designed to operate at altitudes between 35,000 ft (10,668 m) to 50,000 ft (15,240 m) at speeds between Mach 0.75 to Mach 0.9. Range varied between 357 nm and 445 nm (661 to 716 km), also depending on altitude.

Two GAM-72s with folded wings and stabilizers were packaged together for mounting in the bomber weapons bay. Before launch the bomber's radar navigator lowered the GAM-72 using a retractable arm from the airplane's weapons bay into the slipstream below the aircraft. The wings and stabilizers of the GAM-72 were unfolded, the jet engine was started, and the missile was launched.

Flight testing of the XGAM-72 began in July 1957 at Holloman Air Force Base and the adjacent White Sands Missile Range. Initially testing involved the XGAM-72 being captively carried by a B-52. The first glide flight of the XGAM-72 occurred in November 1957. Three test launches were completed in 1957. The first successful powered flight of the XGAM-72 occurred in August 1958. This flight lasted 14 minutes and covered 103 nautical miles (191 km). A total of ten test flights occurred in 1958, seventeen flights in 1959, with the final four flights being completed in 1960. Operational testing then moved to Eglin Air Force Base, Florida, United States where the 4135th Strategic Wing launched a GAM-72 on June 8, 1960.

McDonnell Aircraft received a production contract for the GAM-72A on December 31, 1958. Reliability problems encountered during testing resulted in McDonnell replacing the J85-GE-3 with the J85-GE-7 engine in the production GAM-72A. The GAM-72A was also about 200 lb (90 kg) heavier than the GAM-72. This increase in weight when combined with a slightly smaller wing area reduced the maximum range of the GAM-72A to 402 statute miles (647 km). The first production GAM-72A flight was in March 1960. The final GAM-72A was delivered by McDonnell Aircraft on May 28, 1962. A total of 585 GAM-72A missiles were produced by McDonnell Aircraft. The inventory of GAM-72As in the USAF peaked at 492 in 1963.

During 1963 all remaining GAM-72A missiles were modified to the GAM-72B configuration.

In 1963 the GAM-72 was re-designated the ADM-20

Old Designation	New Designation
GAM-72	ADM-20A
GAM-72A	ADM-20B
GAM-72B	ADM-20C

== Operational history ==
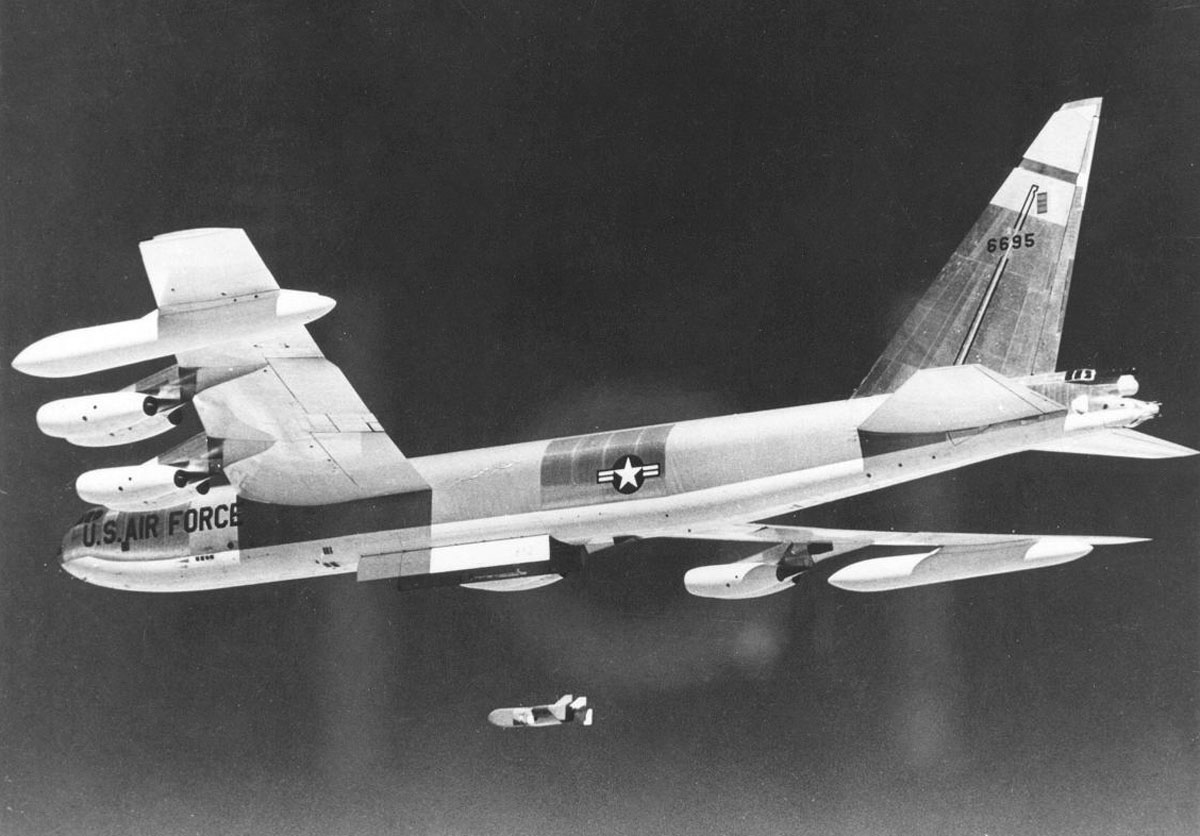
B-52 launching a Quail decoy

Although originally planned for deployment with the B-47 and the B-52, the GAM-72A was only deployed with the B-52.

The first production GAM-72A was delivered to the 4135th Strategic Wing, at Eglin Air Force Base, Florida, on September 13, 1960. Initial operational capability was reached on February 1, 1961, when the first squadron of the 4135th Strategic Wing was equipped with the GAM-72A. On January 1, 1962 B-52 aircraft carried the GAM-72A decoy on airborne alert for the first time. Full operational capability was reached when the GAM-72A was deployed with the fourteenth and final B-52 squadron on April 15, 1962.

The operational version of the GAM-72 carried internal radar reflectors facing forward and to each side of the aircraft. Up to 100 lb (45 kg) of payload could be accommodated internally by the GAM-72. This internal space could be used to house a radar repeater or a chaff dispenser. An infrared burner in the tail could produce intense heat to simulate the heat signature of a bomber. The GAM-72 was not armed.

Eight GAM-72A decoys could be accommodated in the B-52's weapons bay but the normal decoy load was two.

Ground radar continued to improve, and the effectiveness of the GAM-72B, redesignated in 1963 as the ADM-20C, decreased over time. The AGM-69 Short Range Attack Missile (SRAM) allowed bombers to attack air-defense systems from a distance. By 1971, the USAF no longer considered the ADM-20C a credible decoy. The commander of the Strategic Air Command wrote the Chief of Staff of the United States Air Force "that the Quail was only slightly better than nothing." The last ADM-20C operational test was flown at Eglin Air Force Base on July 13, 1972. On June 30, 1978, the last ADM-20C came off alert status. The last ADM-20C was removed from the United States Air Force inventory on December 15, 1978.

== Variants ==
- GAM-72 – 24 test missiles produced
- GAM-72A – 592 missiles produced.
- GAM-72B – Upgrade to remaining GAM-72A missiles
- ADM-20A – GAM-72 re-designated in June 1963
- ADM-20B – GAM-72A re-designated in June 1963
- ADM-20C – GAM-72B re-designated in June 1963

== Operator ==
- United States
  - United States Air Force

The number of GAM-72As in service, by year:

Year	1960	1961	1962	1963	1964	1965	1966	1967	1968	1969	1970	1971	1972	1973	1974	1975	1976	1977
No. in Service	93	397	436	492	477	465	457	448	445	430	430	430	417	417	415	355	355	354

== Survivors ==
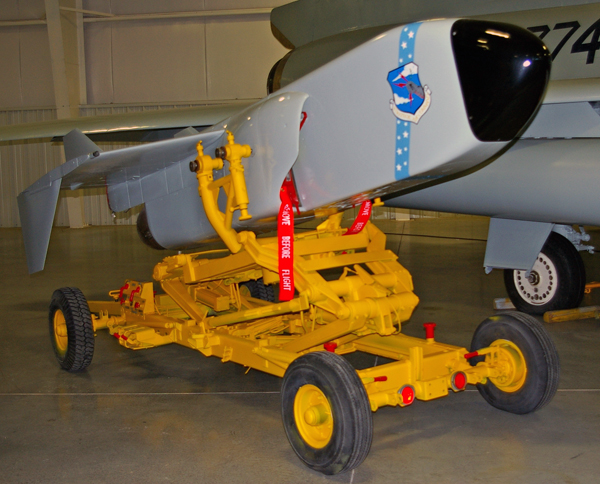
Quail on display at the National Museum of the United States Air Force

- ADM-20B S/N 60–700 located in the National Museum of the United States Air Force, Wright-Patterson Air Force Base, Dayton, Ohio, United States.
- ADM-20 S/N 61-347 located in the Eighth Air Force Museum, Barksdale Air Force Base, Bossier City, Louisiana, United States.
- ADM-20 S/N 60-593 located in the Eighth Air Force Museum, Barksdale Air Force Base.
- ADM-20 located in the Aerospace Museum of California, former McClellan Air Force Base, Sacramento, California, United States.
- ADM-20 S/N 59-2249 located at the Air Force Space & Missile Museum, Cape Canaveral Air Force Station, Florida, United States.
- ADM-20 located at the Strategic Air Command & Aerospace Museum, Ashland, Nebraska, United States.
- ADM-20 S/N 60-505 located at the South Dakota Air and Space Museum, Ellsworth Air Force Base, Rapid City, South Dakota, United States.
- ADM-20 S/N 59-2245 located in the Armed Forces and Aerospace Museum, Spokane, Washington, United States.
- ADM-20C S/N 61-633 located in the Hill Aerospace Museum, Hill Air Force Base, Ogden, Utah, United States.
- ADM-20C located in the Historic Aviation Memorial Museum, Tyler, Texas, United States.
- ADM-20C S/N 61-414 located at the K. I. Sawyer Heritage Air Museum in Gwinn, Michigan, United States.
- ADM-20C located at the Pima Air & Space Museum adjacent to Davis-Monthan Air Force Base, Tucson, Arizona, United States.
- ADM-20C S/N 60-374 located in the Oakland Aviation Museum, Oakland, California, United States.
- ADM-20C S/N 60-755 located in the Southern Museum of Flight, Birmingham, Alabama, United States.
- ADM-20C S/N 61-455 located in the Lone Star Flight Museum, Houston, Texas, United States.
- ADM-20 S/N 64-2573 located in the Museum of Aviation, Robins Air Force Base, Warner Robins, Georgia, United States.

== See also ==
Aircraft of comparable role, configuration, and era

- ADM-141C ITALD
- ADM-160 MALD
- Northrop BQM-74 Chukar
- XSM-74 Buck Duck

Related lists

- List of military aircraft of the United States
- List of missiles
