= Overseer =

Overseer may refer to:

== Professions ==
- Supervisor or superintendent; one who keeps watch over and directs the work of others
- Plantation overseer, often in the context of forced labor or slavery
- Overseer of the poor, an official who administered relief for poor people
- Provveditore, gubernatorial title in the Republic of Venice
- Overseer (rank), a rank in Arab armies.

== Other uses ==
- Aerojet SD-2 Overseer, an unmanned aerial vehicle (UAV) used by the US Army in the 1950s and 1960s
- Many Holiness and Pentecostal denominations call senior church leaders "overseers" or "general overseers." This is a literal translation of the Greek word ἐπίσκοπος, which was borrowed into Latin as episcopus and ultimately became the English word Bishop.
- Rob Overseer, British music producer
- Overseer (probate), a person appointed by a testator to assist and supervise the work of the executors of a will (mainly obsolete)
