= Mark 36 SRBOC =

American short-range decoy launching system

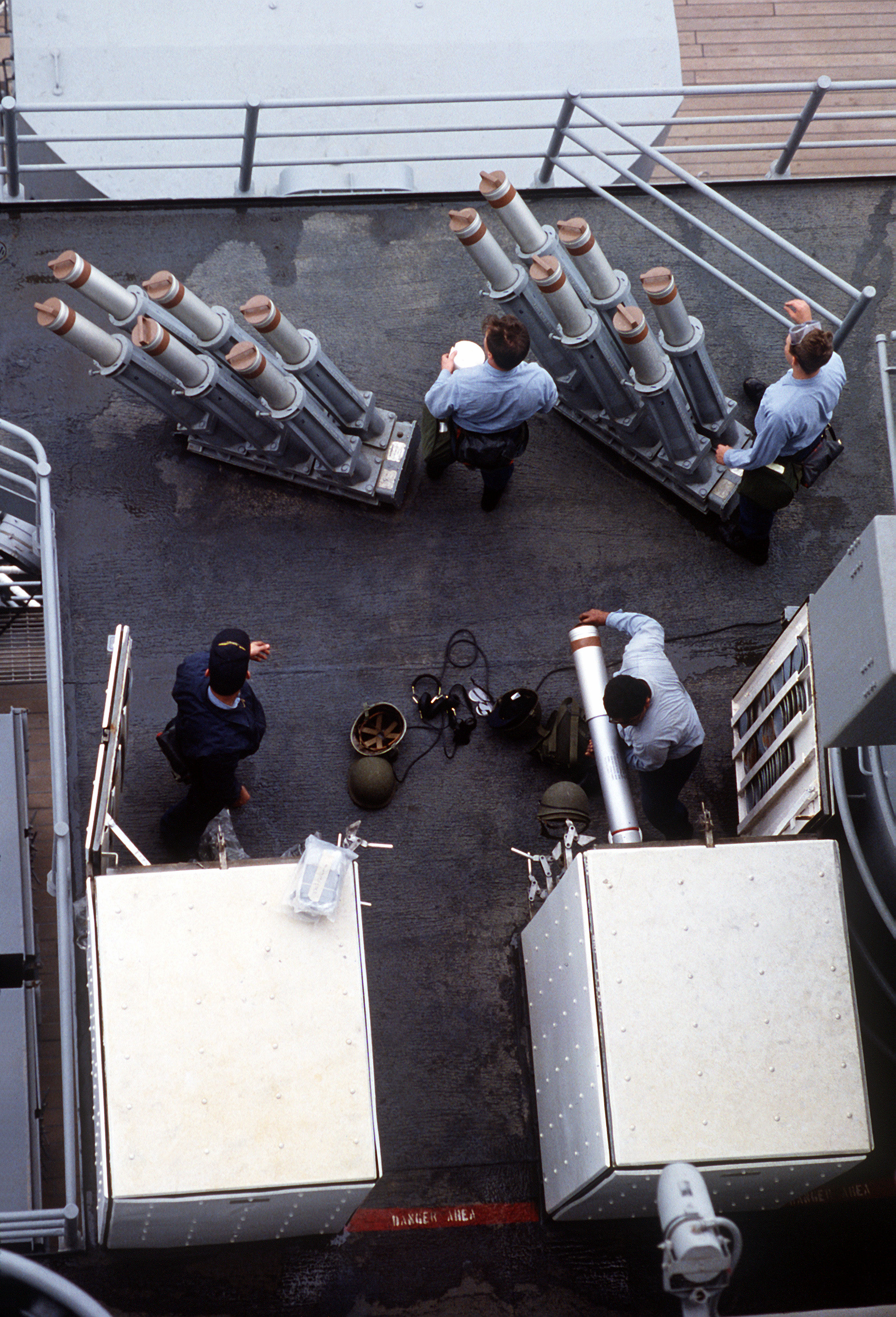
Two Mark 36 Mod 7 SRBOC launchers aboard the battleship USS Wisconsin during Operation Desert Storm.

The BAE Systems Mark 36 Super Rapid Bloom Offboard Countermeasures Chaff and Decoy Launching System (abbreviated as SRBOC or "Super-arboc") is an American short-range decoy launching system (DLS) that launches radar or infrared decoys from naval vessels to foil incoming anti-ship missiles. The decoys present false signals and interference to the attacking missiles' guidance and fire-control systems.

== Description ==
The Mark 36 SRBOC uses the Mark 137 launcher, which has six fixed 130 mm mortar tubes arranged in two parallel rows. One row is set at 45 degrees and the other is set at 60 degrees, providing a spread of the launched decoys. Firing circuits use electromagnetic induction to set off the propelling charges in the decoy cartridges. They are launched at a speed of 75 m/s.

Each launcher holds 12–36 rounds, depending on variant. The number and arrangement of Mk 36 launchers installed depends on the size of the ship, ranging from two launchers on a small combatant to as many as eight on an aircraft carrier.

To complement conventional ballistic decoys, the FLYRT (FLYing Radar Target) decoy had been developed in the 1990s. It had rocket propulsion and flew at a ship-like speed in an attempt to present itself as a surface target. However, FLYRT did not undergo production. Instead, a modified version of the Mark 36 SRBOC, redesignated as the Mark 53 decoy launching system, was created to use the newer Nulka active radar decoy. Nulka hovers in the air and emits radiofrequency energy to lure the seekers of anti-ship missiles.

The Mark 36 is interfaced with the AN/SLQ-32 electronic warfare suite. The SLQ-32 (with the exception of the (V)4 variant) can automatically fire decoys from the Mark 36 SRBOCs when it detects an anti-ship missile attack.

The Mark 36 SRBOC is similar to the Sea Gnat decoy system.

== Components ==
The decoy launching system consists of:

- Mark 137 launcher
- Mark 158 Mod 1/2 master launcher control - located in the Combat Information Center. This is the primary means of operating the system.
- Mark 164 Mod 1/2 bridge launcher control - gives the bridge the capability to also control the system.
- Mark 160 Mod 1 power supply (one for each launcher) below deck - the power supplies operate from the onboard single-phase network 440 V, 60 Hz and supply launchers with a constant voltage of 28 V. In the event of a lack of voltage in the on-board network, they are capable of delivering 24 V from emergency batteries for 5–8 hours.
- Ready service lockers with Mark 5 Mod 2 or Mark 6 Mod 0 rounds - located near each launcher, they enable quick reloading of the decoy launching systems.

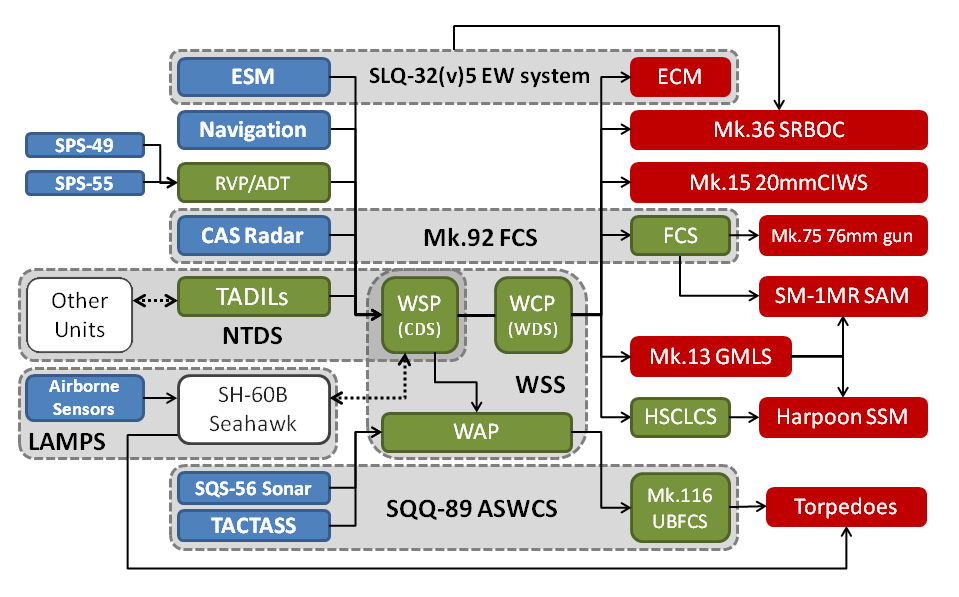
The SRBOC was part of the combat systems of the Oliver Hazard Perry-class frigate.

== Ammunition ==
The Mark 36 can be equipped with and fire the following decoys:

- Mark 182 Mod 1/2 seduction chaff decoy
- Mark 214 Mod 0 Sea Gnat seduction chaff decoy
- Mark 216 Mod 0 Sea Gnat distraction chaff decoy
- Mark 186 TORCH infrared decoy
- Mark 245 GIANT infrared decoy
- C-GEM Active Offboard Decoy

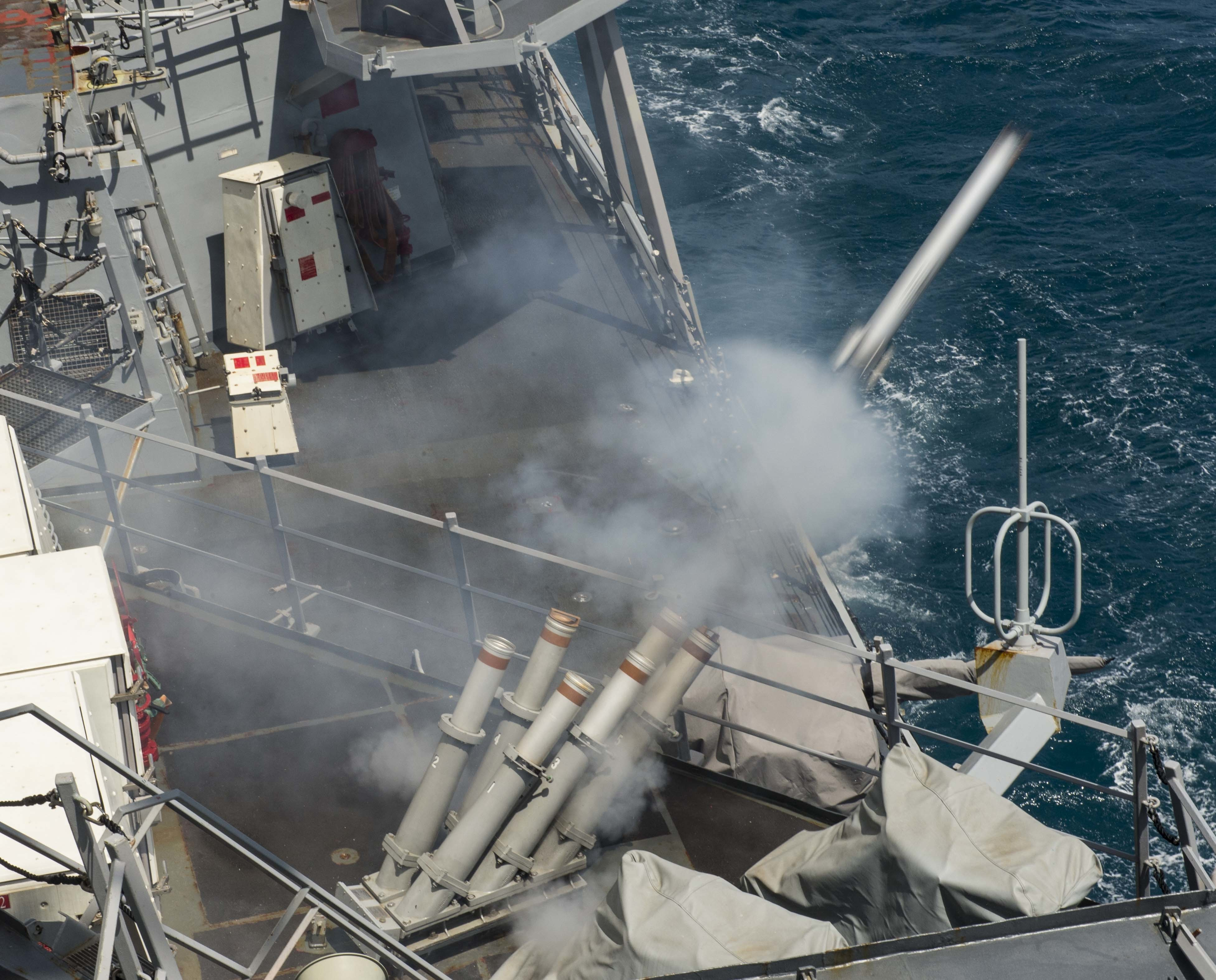
Mark 36 SRBOC fires a chaff decoy from USS Stout.

== Variants ==
Mod	Total # of Rounds in Launchers (# of Launchers)	# of Ready Service Rounds (# of Lockers)
1 and 5	12 (2 launchers)	40 (2 lockers)
2, 6, and 9	24 (4 launchers)	80 (4 lockers)
8	48 (8 launchers)	160 (8 lockers)
10	36 (6 launchers)	120 (6 lockers)
11	24 (4 launchers)	140 (4 lockers)
12	36 (6 launchers)	210 (6 lockers)

Table reference:

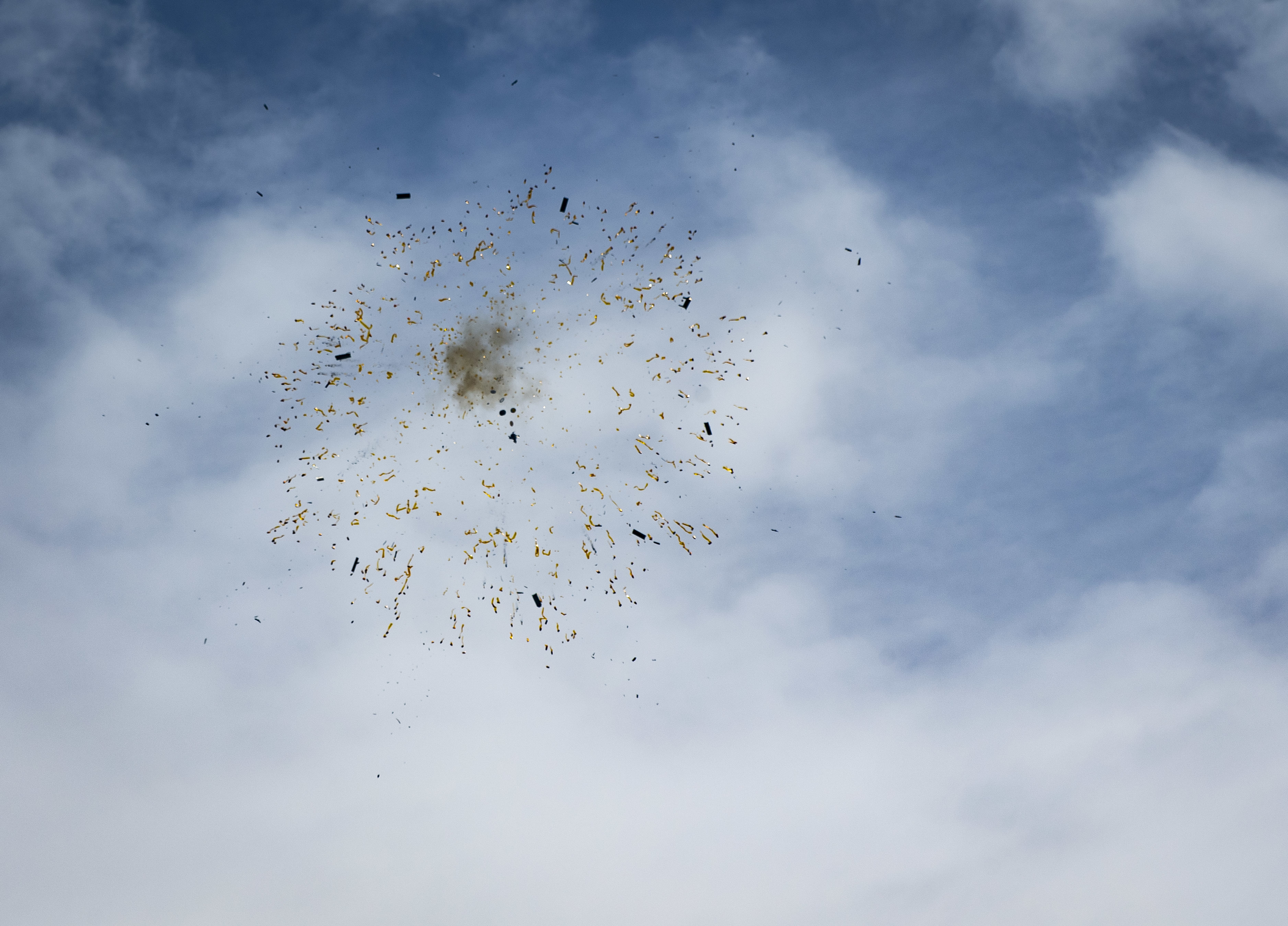
Mark 36 SRBOC chaff decoy explodes.

== Operators ==
As of 2010, over 1,000 Mark 36 SRBOC systems are in use by the fleets of at least 19 countries, including:

- Australia
- Belgium
- Brazil
- Canada
- Chile
- Germany
- Greece
- Italy
- Japan
- Netherlands
- Norway
- Philippines
- Portugal
- Saudi Arabia
- South Korea
- Spain
- Turkey
- United Arab Emirates
- United Kingdom
- United States
- Republic of China
