= Teledyne CAE J700 =

Turbojet engine

J700
- Type: Turbojet
- National origin: United States
- Manufacturer: Teledyne CAE
- Major applications: ADM-141 TALD

The Teledyne CAE J700 is a small turbojet engine designed to power unmanned air vehicles such as missiles. It was developed for and powers the ADM-141C ITALD air-launched decoy missile.

== Design and development ==
In the early 1990s, Brunswick developed an improved version of the ADM-141 TALD decoy missile with turbojet power, the ADM-141C. Teledyne CAE responded by developing the J700 turbojet for the ADM-141C, giving the missile improved range and a flight profile resembling aircraft.

== Variants ==
J402-CA-100

- Variant of the engine used in the ADM-141C ITALD.

== Applications ==
- ADM-141C ITALD

== Specifications (J700-CA-400) ==
Data from

==== General characteristics ====
- Type: Turbojet
- Length:
- Diameter:
- Dry weight:

==== Components ====
- Compressor:

==== Performance ====
- Maximum thrust: 180 lbf (0.78 kN)
