= Rate gyro =

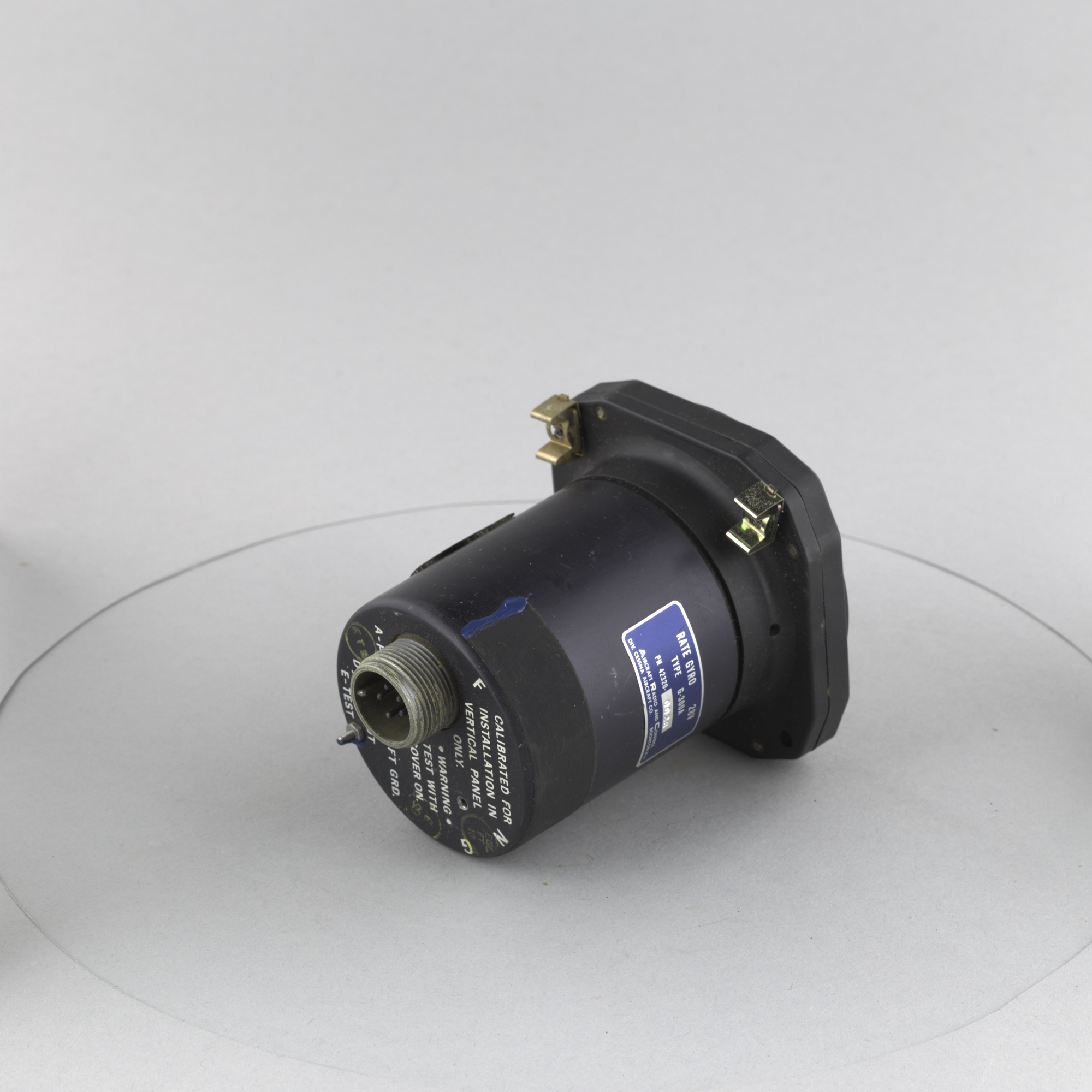
A combination indicator, turn coordinator and rate gyro.

A rate gyro is a type of gyroscope, which rather than indicating direction, indicates the rate of change of angle with time. If a gyro has only one gimbal ring, with consequently only one plane of freedom, it can be adapted for use as a rate gyro to measure a rate of angular movement.

Rate gyros are used in rate integrating gyroscopes, and in attitude control systems for vehicles, and in combination with other sensors to make inertial navigation systems.

The advantage of rate gyros over other types of gyros is the fast response rate and their relatively low cost.

== Principles ==
=== Spinning ===
The traditional type of rate gyro employs relatively conventional gyroscopes with viscous couplings to transfer the spin rate to allow it to be read.

=== Vibrating structure gyroscope ===
MEMS gyros are cheap and have no moving parts. They often work by sonic resonance effects driven by piezoelectric transducers, that provide a signal when a rotation occurs.
