= Unmanned aerial vehicle programs of the Central Intelligence Agency =

Drone application for intelligence

There are two prominent unmanned aerial vehicle (UAV) programs within the United States: that of the military and that of the Central Intelligence Agency (CIA). The military's UAV program is overt, meaning that the public recognizes which government operates it and, therefore, it only operates where US troops are stationed. The CIA's program is covert and remains classified top secret even though it has been widely discussed in the public domain for years.

Missions performed by the CIA's UAV program do not always occur where US troops are stationed. For example, the strike conducted by the CIA, killing Ayman al-Zawahiri was conducted just under a year after U.S. Forces withdrew from Afghanistan.

The CIA's UAV program was commissioned as a result of the 11 September terrorist attacks and the increasing emphasis on operations for intelligence gathering in 2004.

== See also ==
- Insectothopter
