= Horus A =

US unmanned aerial vehicle

The Horus A is an unmanned aerial vehicle of the United States.

In late 2024, press reports indicated the Horus A drone was undergoing flight testing by the US Army. The aircraft is described as a "persistent" drone, capable of very long flight times as it is powered by solar panels driving eight electric motors. It is reportedly able to carry a mission payload of 68kg. It is projected to conduct intelligence missions or perhaps to aid in communications or the control of other drone aircraft.
