= Historic Aviation Memorial Museum =

- Location within Texas
- Established: 25 January 1985
- Location: Tyler, Texas
- Coordinates: 32.3589°N 95.3989°W
- Type: Aviation museum
- Founder: Bob Layton
- Website: www.tylerhamm.org

The Historic Aviation Memorial Museum is an aviation museum located at the Tyler Pounds Regional Airport in Tyler, Texas.

== History ==
=== Background ===
The Lone Star Wing of the Confederate Air Force was established in 1981 to restore a PBY-6A and build a hangar to house it. However, before the latter could happen, the aircraft was destroyed in accident in October 1984. As a result, on 25 January 1985 he established the Historic Aircraft Memorial Foundation and began raising money for a museum.

=== Establishment ===
The museum reorganized in 1995 to focus on the construction of a museum. To that end, a three phase plan for 2,000 sq ft (190 m^{2}) exhibit hall, 2,000 sq ft (190 m^{2}) multipurpose hall and 13,000 sq ft (1,200 m^{2}) hangar on the east side of the airport was announced.

Almost two years after construction was completed, the first phase, the Raiford L. Perry Exhibit Hall, opened on 9 June 2001. By that time, the organization had changed its name to the Historic Aviation Memorial Museum and construction had begun on phase two. The museum received its first airplane, an F-1E, on loan from the U.S. Navy in December 2001. It continued to grow, adding an F-111, F-105 and T-33 in 2004 – the latter two from the Pate Museum of Transportation. By July 2005, all three buildings had been completed and an F-4 had been acquired.

=== Move ===
The museum signed a lease for the 11,000 sq ft (1,000 m^{2}) first floor of the old terminal building on the north side of the airport in June 2006. It began renovating the building, which opened to the public on 5 July 2007.

The museum received an F9F and an F-101 in 2011.

== Facilities ==
A library is located at the museum.

The original museum, now used as a restoration hangar, has housed two MiG-17Fs that are part of FighterJets, Inc. since 2000. (Note: One of the group's pilots was killed in a crash in September 2012.)

== Collection ==
=== Aircraft ===
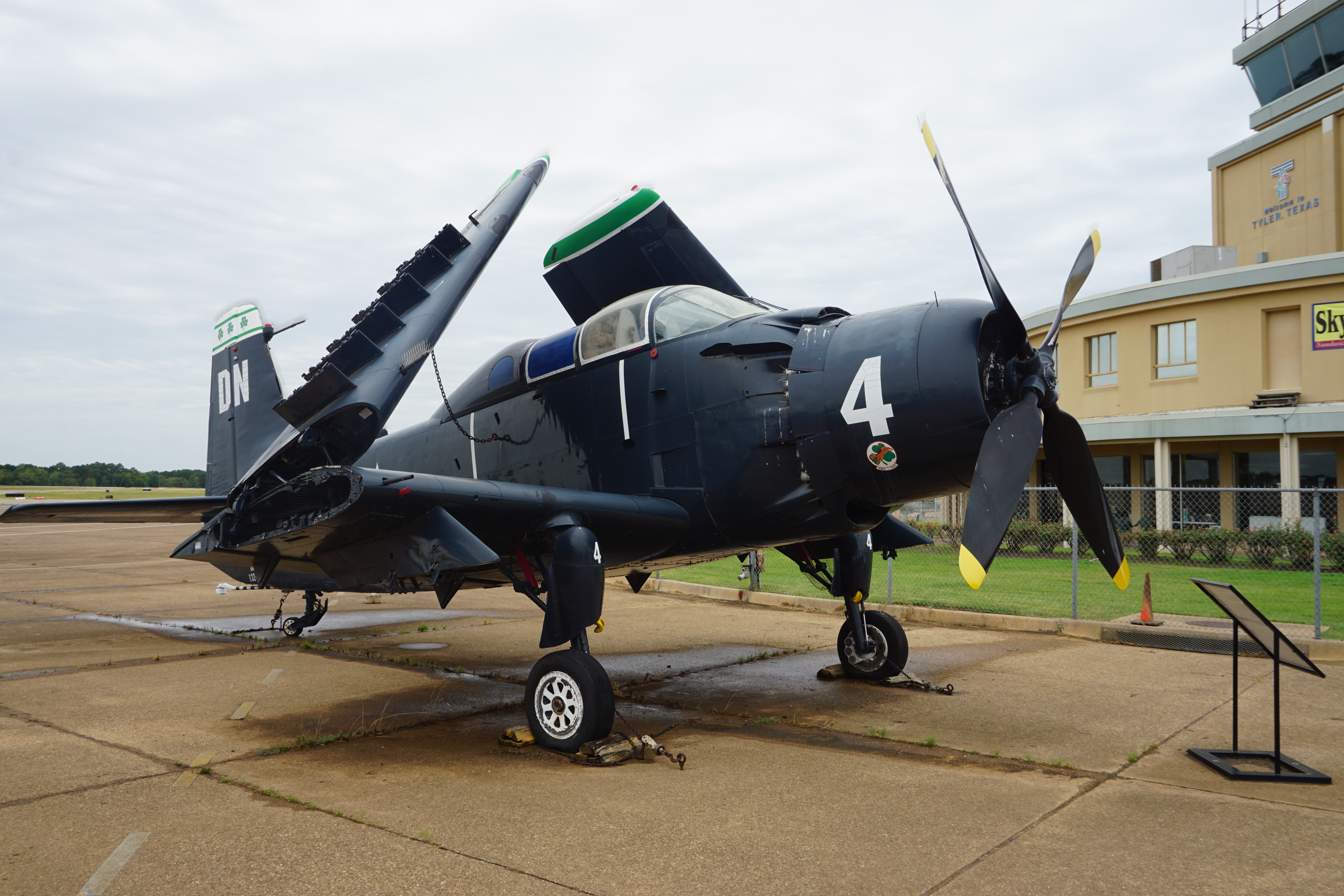
Douglas AD-5 Skyraider

- Bell UH-1 Iroquois
- Cessna T-37B Tweet
- Douglas AD-5 Skyraider
- Douglas TA-4J Skyhawk
- General Dynamics F-111E Aardvark
- Grumman F9F Cougar
- Lockheed F-104A Starfighter
- Lockheed T-33
- McDonnell Douglas F-4D Phantom II
- Mikoyan-Gurevich MiG-17F
- North American F-100 Super Sabre
- North American FJ-4 Fury
- North American T-2C Buckeye
- PZL TS-11 Iskra
- Republic F-105D Thunderchief
- Sikorsky HO4S

=== Other ===
- ADM-20 Quail

== Events ==
The museum held an annual airshow called the Thunder Over Cedar Creek Lake. It was replaced by the Rose City Airfest in 2021.

In 2016, the museum held the Rose City Rotor Fest featuring the American Heroes Air Show.

== Programs ==
The museum has an educational outreach program, such as Aviation 101 Camp, and a series of heritage presentations and lectures.

== See also ==
- List of aviation museums
