= XSM-74 =

- Type: Decoy missile

Production history
- Manufacturer: Convair

Specifications
- Mass: 5,000 lb (2,268 kg) to 7,500 lb (3,402 kg)
- Length: 29 ft 5 in (9 m)
- Wingspan: 20 ft (6 m) to 25 (7.5 m)
- Warhead: None
- Operational range: 4,000 nmi (7,400 km)
- Flight ceiling: 50,000 ft (15,200 m)
- Flight altitude: 50,000 ft (15,200 m).
- Maximum speed: Mach 0.80 to Mach 0.90
- Launch platform: Zero-length ground launcher

The Convair XSM-74 was a subsonic, jet-powered, ground-launched decoy cruise missile.

== Development ==
In March 1953, the United States Air Force released General Operational Requirement (GOR) 16 which called for a long range decoy missile to increase the effectiveness of Strategic Air Command bombers by confusing and saturating an air defense system. Multiple XSM-74 missiles would be ground-launched from Strategic Air Command bases located in the United States. Fifty percent of the deployed XSM-74 missiles would be launched within the first hour after an alert, and the remaining missiles would be launched one hour later. The requirement called for 85 percent of the decoy missiles to arrive at the target area within 100 nmi (190 km). The XSM-74 was to fly 4,000 nmi (7,400 km) at speed of at least Mach 0.85 at an operating altitude of 50,000 ft (15,240 m) with a payload of 500 lb (227 kg). After flying 2,500 nmi (4,600 km), the XSM-74 would simulate the performance of the B-47 Stratojet or B-52 Stratofortress over the final 1,500 nmi (2,800 km) of flight.

Study contracts were awarded to Convair and Fairchild in July 1954 by the United States Air Force under the project designation MX-2223. According to USAF records, the designation XSM-74 was proposed for the MX-2223 missile, but never actually approved.

The Convair MX-2223 design called for a non-metallic fuselage with swept wings and a V-tail. Radar reflectors were located in the fuselage and on pods positioned on the wing tips to simulate the radar signature of a strategic bomber.

Development of the XSM-74 was suspended in December 1955 when Fairchild was awarded a contract by the USAF to develop the XSM-73 Goose.

== Variants ==
- MX-2223: Original U.S. Air Force Project Designator.
- XSM-74: Designation reserved for prototypes

== Operator ==
- United States
  - United States Air Force

== See also ==
Aircraft of comparable role, configuration, and era

- ADM-141 TALD
- BGM-109G Ground Launched Cruise Missile
- MGM-1 Matador
- MGM-13 Mace
- Northrop BQM-74 Chukar
- SM-64 Navaho

Related lists

- List of military aircraft of the United States
- List of missiles
