= Decoy missile =

Type of guided missile

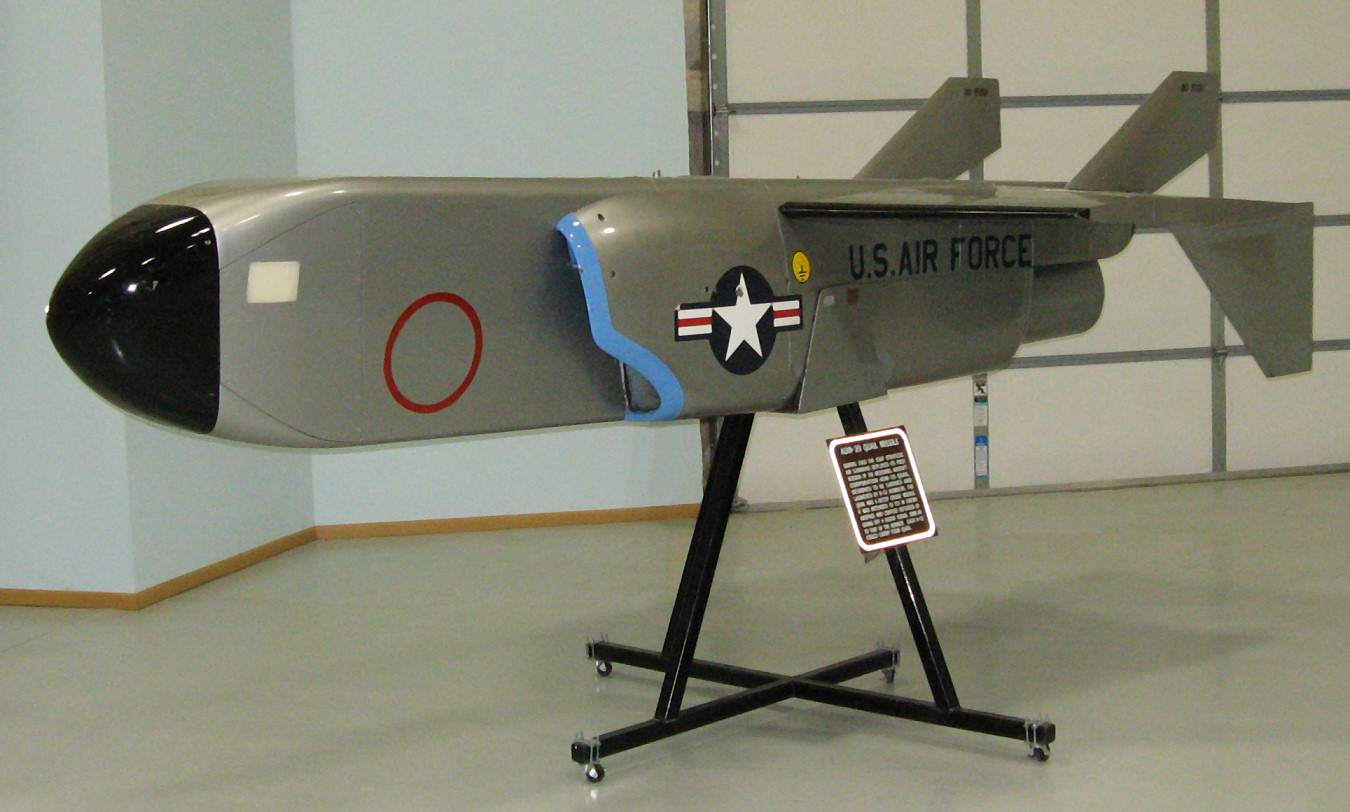
Decoy Missile display in Ellsworth Air Force base

A decoy missile is a type of guided missile with the highly specialized task of producing a radar signature similar to that of a bomber aircraft. They would be launched during the bomber's approach to enemy airspace, producing additional targets that would complicate the operation of ground controlled interception (GCI) radars and their associated weapons like surface-to-air missiles. For this role, the primary qualities are small size and light weight, allowing as many as possible to be carried.

The concept emerged during the 1950s and a number of proposed designs were introduced, often based on target drone missiles, as was the early US Green Quail, or in some cases, larger cruise missiles like the British UB.109T and US Bull Goose. These systems generally fell from favor as other concepts for avoiding interception were introduced, like electronic countermeasures and terrain masking. The first known example to go into service was the ADM-20 Quail, which was active on the Boeing B-52 Stratofortress from 1960 until 1978. At its peak in the early 1970s, 492 Quails were in the inventory, and the B-52G models carried up to four. After that time it was replaced by the AGM-86 ALCM cruise missile, whose long range allowed the B-52s to avoid entering protected airspace at all.

Since that time, the US has introduced two new decoy missiles, the small ADM-141 TALD and the larger ADM-160 MALD. The TALD is the size of a small bomb and can be carried by many aircraft, and generally intended to be used in the tactical role to simulate larger attacks by fighter aircraft. The MALD is larger, but still much smaller than the Quail, and is intended for the B-52 and Rockwell B-1 Lancer.
