= Fairchild SD-5 Osprey =

SD-5 Osprey
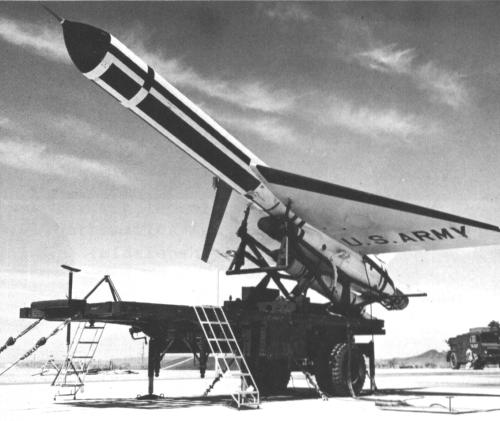

General information
- Type: Reconnaissance drone
- National origin: United States
- Manufacturer: Fairchild Aircraft
- Primary user: United States Army
- Number built: 15

History
- Developed from: Fairchild SM-73 Bull Goose

The Fairchild SD-5 Osprey was an early high-speed reconnaissance drone developed by Fairchild Aircraft for the United States Army. Intended for use by the U.S. Army Signal Corps to gather targeting information for tactical ballistic missiles, it was cancelled before the first prototype could be completed, and did not see operational service.

== Design and development ==
In 1960 the U.S. Army issued a requirement for the development of a high-speed, long-range reconnaissance drone to provide targeting information to the Army's tactical ballistic missile force; contracts for competing designs were awarded to Republic Aviation, which proposed an all-new design given the designation SD-4 Swallow, and Fairchild Aircraft, which developed a variant of the Bull Goose decoy missile as the SD-5 Osprey.

Given the full designation AN/USD-5 for its overall system, the SD-5 was of tailless delta configuration, with power provided by a Pratt & Whitney J60 turbojet (the military version of the civilian JT12 engine); a single rocket booster of the jet-assisted takeoff type, giving 40,000 lbf (180 kN) thrust for 3 seconds, allowed for zero-length launch from a specially designed trailer. Recovery following the mission was by parachute, with airbags used to cushion the landing; sensors including infrared scanners, side-looking airborne radar (SLAR) and optical mapping were available for use, and could be recovered following the mission, or transmitted during the mission via telemetry. Guidance during the mission was provided by an inertial navigation system and autopilot.

== Operational history ==
The first flight of the SD-5 took place in May 1960; fifteen prototypes were constructed for the test program, with Fairchild quoting a cost per drone of $350,000-$400,000 USD for production aircraft. An operational date of 1964 was anticipated; however, due to the cost of the program, the SD-5 was cancelled in November 1962 before entering service.

== Specifications ==
Data from Parsch 2004

General characteristics

- Crew: None
- Length: 36 ft 8 in (11.18 m)
- Wingspan: 24 ft 8 in (7.52 m)
- Height: 8 ft (2.4 m)
- Gross weight: 9,000 lb (4,082 kg)
- Powerplant: 1 × Pratt & Whitney J60 turbojet, 3,000 lbf (13 kN) thrust

Performance

- Maximum speed: Mach 0.7
- Range: 1,000 mi (1,600 km, 870 nmi)
- Service ceiling: 35,000 ft (11,000 m)

== See also ==
- Joint Electronics Type Designation System – Unclassified designation system for United States military electronic equipment

Related development

- XSM-73 Goose

Aircraft of comparable role, configuration, and era

- Republic SD-4 Swallow

Related lists

- List of military aircraft of the United States
- List of military electronics of the United States
- List of unmanned aerial vehicles
