= Rate integrating gyroscope =

A Rate integrating gyroscope is a rate gyro with a built in integrator. It is usually a component of an Inertial Measurement Unit or a stabilization system.

== Principle of operation ==
In a rate integrating gyroscope, the gyroscope is turned at a steady rate about its input axis and a torque is applied to the spin axis. This causes the gyroscope to precess about the output axis. The rate indicating gyroscope consists of a damping fluid between the float assembly can and the outer casing. This viscous fluid resists the motion of the gimbal precession. This causes the gimbal to accelerate initially in the fluid, until the damping effect is equal to the precessing force. The rate of precession, will hence be directly proportional to the rate of turn of the gyroscope about its input axis and the total angle of movement about the output axis will be proportional to the speed and length of time the input axis is turning.

In a typical application (e.g. an aircraft), the output axis could have revolved 180 degrees clockwise in 20 seconds, then 80° anti-clockwise (say if the aircraft was changing direction again). This output would then be fed to a computer to calculate the total distance traveled (Inertial Navigation Platform).

- US Dynamics Rate Integrating Gyroscope Technical Brief

=== Key ===
- Spin Axis: Spin Axis is the axis of rotation of the rotor (rotating mass).
- Input Axis: Input Axis is the Axis about which the torque is applied.
- Output Axis: Output axis is the Axis perpendicular to the input axis and the spin axis.

== Gimbal gain ==
Gimbal gain is the amount of precession that can be varied by varying the viscosity of the damping fluid. For (for example) increased sensitivity of a gyroscopic instrument.
