= Republic SD-3 Snooper =

SD-3 Snooper
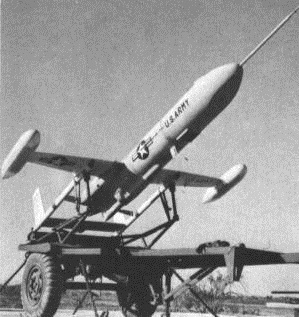
- SD-3 on launcher

General information
- Type: Reconnaissance drone
- National origin: United States
- Manufacturer: Republic Aviation
- Primary user: United States Army
- Number built: 50

History
- First flight: January 1959

The Republic SD-3 Snooper was an early reconnaissance drone developed by Republic Aviation for the United States Army. It was evaluated by the Army Signal Corps in 1959, but did not enter operational service.

== Design and development ==
The Guided Missiles Division of Republic Aviation was awarded a contract for development of a short-range reconnaissance drone in 1957, winning a competition conducted by the U.S. Army to fill the requirement. Given the overall designation AN/USD-3 for the entire system, and sometimes referred to as Sky Spy, the Snooper was of twin-boom configuration, a single Continental IO-200 horizontally-opposed piston engine being mounted in a pusher configuration. The drone was capable of flying for up to 30 minutes, allowing it to overfly multiple reconnaissance targets during a single flight.

Launch was from a zero-length launch setup, two rocket boosters burning solid fuel being used to assist the aircraft into flight; following a mission, which could either use autopilot control following a programmed course or radio command guidance from a ground station, the Snooper would land via parachute; airbags were installed in the airframe to cushion the landing. The SD-3's nose section was designed to be interchangeable among a number of payloads; options included television, aerial photography, infrared photography, or radar systems.

== Operational history ==
Revealed to the press in late 1958, the SD-3 first flew in January 1959; following manufacturer's trials, the U.S. Army ordered fifty pre-production aircraft to conduct a full evaluation of the system. Although the trials, conducted by the Signal Corps, were considered successful, the Army cancelled the SD-3 program at the end of the trials. However, the SD-3's twin-boom pusher design would become commonly used by unmanned aerial vehicles in later years.

== Specifications ==
Data from Parsch 2004

General characteristics

- Crew: None
- Length: 15 ft 3 in (4.65 m)
- Wingspan: 11 ft 2 in (3.40 m)
- Gross weight: 1,000 lb (454 kg)
- Powerplant: 1 × Continental IO-200 horizontally opposed piston engine, 100 hp (75 kW)

Performance

- Maximum speed: 300 mph (480 km/h, 260 kn)
- Range: 100 mi (160 km, 87 nmi)
- Endurance: 30 minutes
- Service ceiling: 20,000 ft (6,100 m)

== See also ==
- Joint Electronics Type Designation System – Unclassified designation system for United States military electronic equipment

Aircraft of comparable role, configuration, and era

- Aerojet SD-2 Overseer
- Radioplane MQM-57 Falconer
- Beechcraft MQM-61 Cardinal

Related lists

- List of military aircraft of the United States
- List of military electronics of the United States
- List of unmanned aerial vehicles
