= Aerojet SD-2 Overseer =

1950s-1960s aerial drone in U.S. Army

SD-2 Overseer
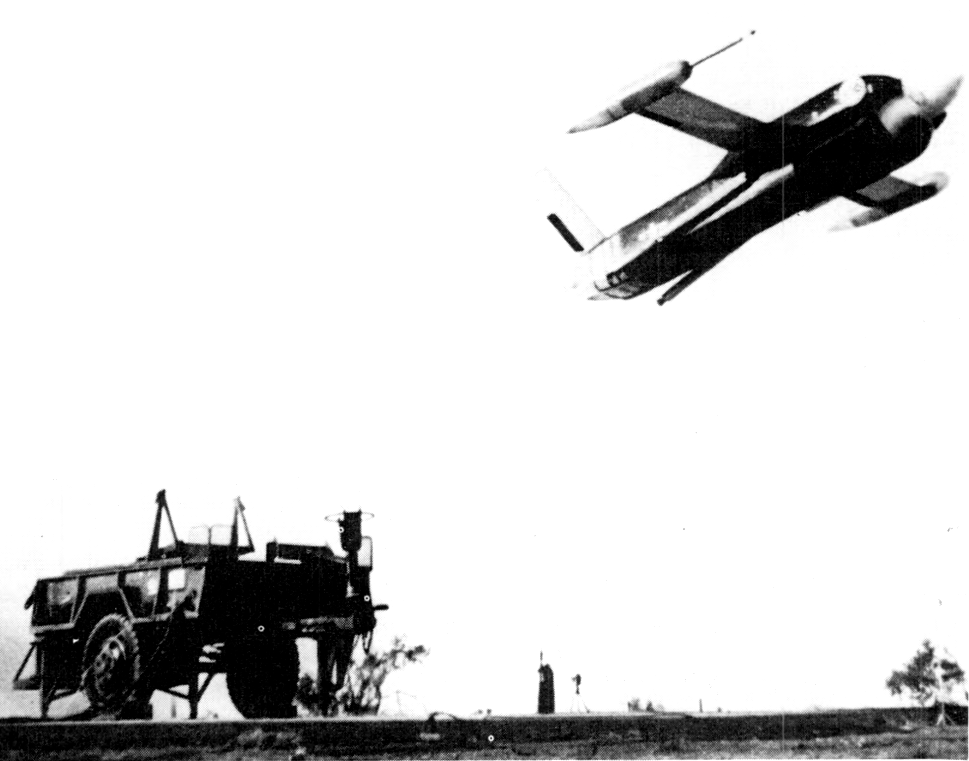

General information
- Type: Reconnaissance drone
- National origin: United States
- Manufacturer: Aerojet General
- Primary user: United States Army
- Number built: 35

History
- First flight: c.1959
- Retired: late 1960s

The Aerojet SD-2 Overseer was an unmanned aerial vehicle developed by Aerojet General and Rheem Manufacturing Co. in the late 1950s for use by the United States Army. Built in limited numbers, it never saw operational service.

== Design and development ==
Development of the SD-2 drone began in 1957 by the Rheem Manufacturing Company, and the project continued through the company's acquisition by Aerojet General in 1959. Developed as part of the AN/USD-2 surveillance system, the SD-2 was designed for truck launch using two solid rocket boosters; following launch, a piston engine provided propulsion. At the end of its mission, the drone would be recovered via parachute. Control was provided by a translateration system for navigation (similar to the much later differential GPS technology), which allowed the aircraft to steer on a pre-programmed course.

The SD-2 was designed to use a modular sensor system, allowing equipment to be switched between missions according to requirements. Available payloads included cameras for either recovered or real-time photography, AN/AAD-2 infrared sensor, AN/DPD-2 side looking airborne radar, or equipment for the dispensing of biological or chemical warfare agents from tanks mounted under the wings of the aircraft.

== Operational history ==
Thirty-five production SD-2s were produced. Poor results from the navigation system resulted in the system's cancellation in 1966, and the program was terminated without any Overseers having seen operational service. In 1963, the SD-2 was given the designation MQM-58A under the revised designation system.

== Specifications ==
Data from Jane's All The World's Aircraft 1965–66

General characteristics

- Crew: None
- Length: 16 ft 1 in (4.9 m)
- Wingspan: 13 ft 4 in (4.06 m)
- Height: 3 ft 7 in (1.09 m)
- Wing area: 27.8 sq ft (2.58 m^{2})
- Aspect ratio: 6.4
- Gross weight: 992 lb (450 kg)
- Max takeoff weight: 1,124 lb (510 kg) without boosters; 1,334 lb (605 kg) including boosters
- Powerplant: 1 × Lycoming LIO-360-B1B horizontally opposed piston engine, 225 hp (168 kW)

Performance

- Maximum speed: 345 mph (556 km/h, 300 kn)
- Combat range: 115 mi (185 km, 100 nmi)
- Endurance: 45 minutes
- Service ceiling: 20,000 ft (6,100 m)

Avionics

- 234 lb (106 kg) equipment capacity.

== See also ==
- Joint Electronics Type Designation System – Unclassified designation system for United States military electronic equipment

Aircraft of comparable role, configuration, and era

- Radioplane MQM-57 Falconer
- Republic SD-3 Snooper

Related lists

- List of military electronics of the United States
