= ADM-141 TALD =

American decoy missile

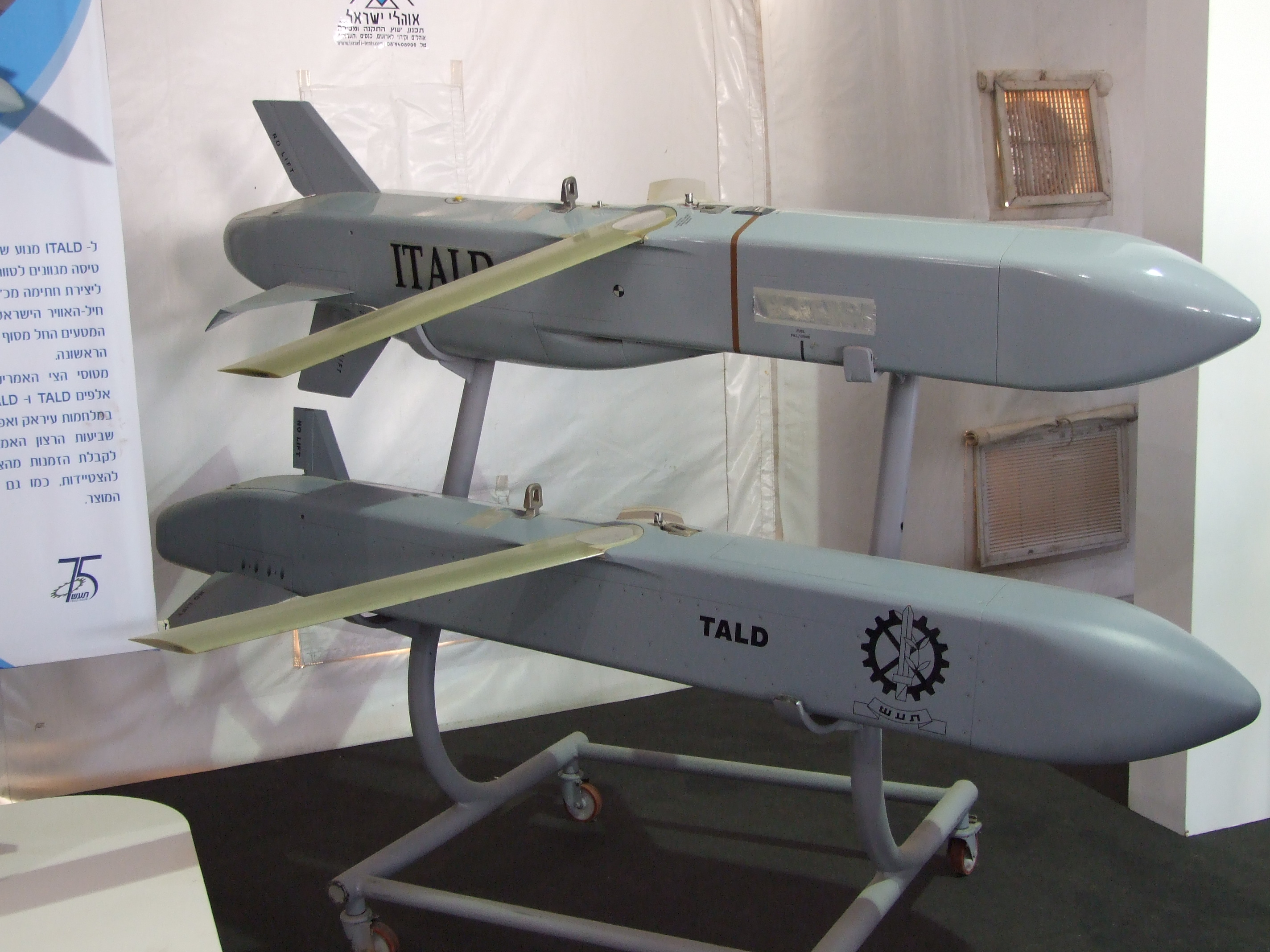
IMI TALD and IMI ITALD

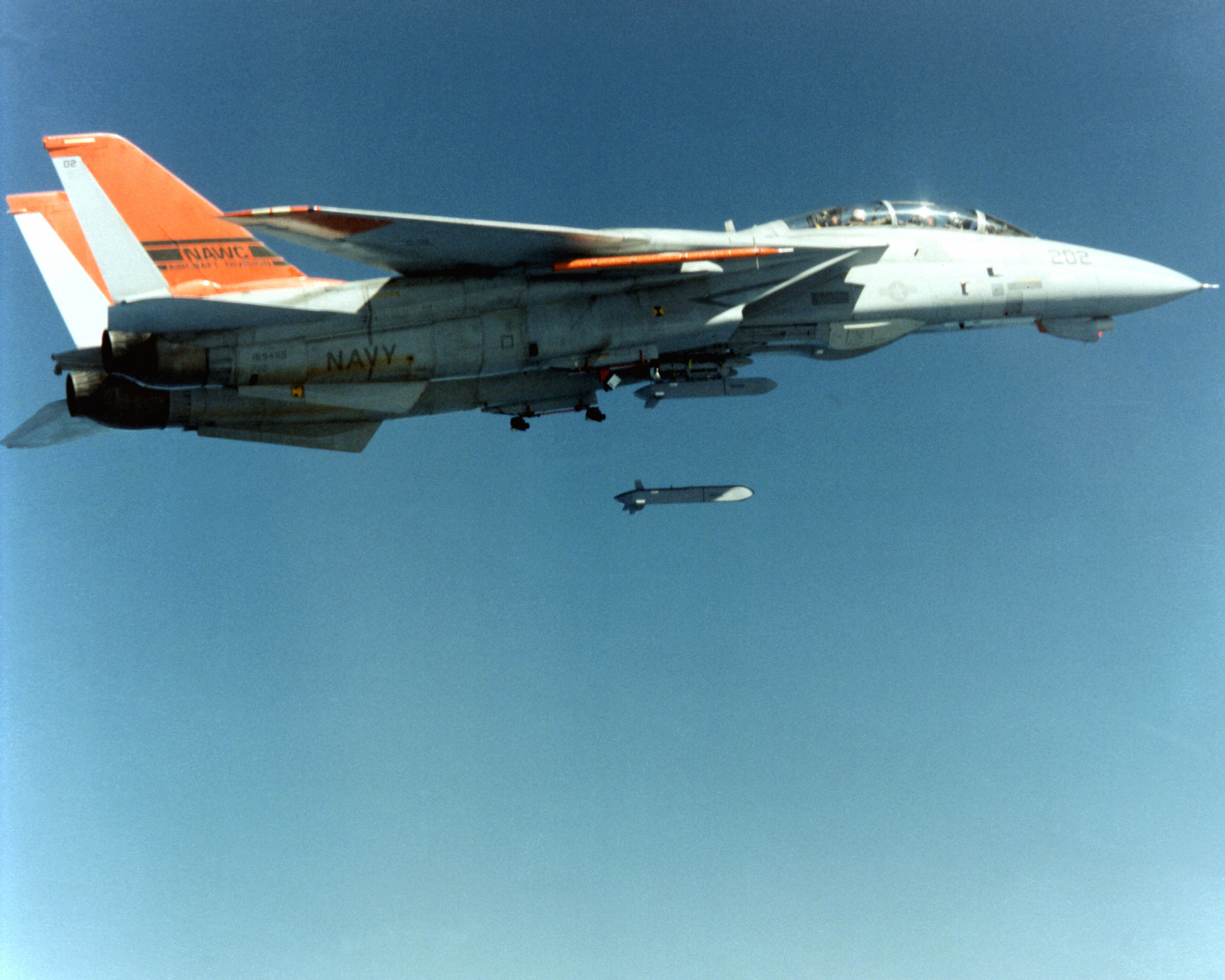
F-14 launching a TALD

The ADM-141A/B TALD was an American decoy missile originally built by Brunswick Corporation for the United States Air Force and the Israeli Air Force. Later it transitioned to joint US/Israeli manufacture with Israeli Military Industries Advanced Systems Division (IMI-ASD).

The Tactical Air Launched Decoy (TALD) was intended to confuse and saturate enemy air defenses, as part of an overall Suppression of Enemy Air Defenses strategy, thus allowing attacking aircraft and weapons a higher probability of penetrating to the target. The Improved TALD (ITALD) is a turbojet-powered version, granting extended range.

== History ==
In the 1970s, Celesco Industries Inc. (later acquired by Brunswick Corp.) developed a family of powered and unpowered radar decoys in response to a series of USAF Avionics Laboratory studies that began with "Tactical Expendable Assessments" in 1970. The most advanced of these was the Samson, a winged unpowered decoy with cylindrical cross section and cruciform tail surfaces.

500 Samsons were exported to the Israeli Air Force over the mid-1970s (approval had been granted in September 1964, but deliveries were delayed due to a period of political 'Reassessment' of Israel–United States relations). These decoys were supplied along with technical data that allowed local production of Samson by Israel Military Industries (IMI) in the early 1980s.

The Samson proved highly successful in Israeli service, particularly during the 1982 Lebanon War, prompting the US Navy to purchase about 2000 of them from IMI/Brunswick during the mid to late 1980s. The US Navy introduced the Samson with the VA-196 'Milestones' in 1985. In the same year, Brunswick was asked to develop an improved Samson named TALD and the first units of these entered US service in 1987.

Whilst the 99th Congress had ensured technology transfer of the battle-tested IMI Samson variant back to US and given Brunswick production and development contracts for the initial batch of TALDs, later orders would only go to IMI. This led to the closure of the former Celesco plant in Costa Mesa, California.

== Design ==
The TALD resembles the modern ground-attack cluster munition dispensing AGM-154 JSOW, with a square fuselage that tapers into a horizontal line near the nose and flip out wings. The tail control surfaces and stabilizers differ, as the TALD resembles conventional aircraft with two horizontal stabilizers and one vertical stabilizer. This configuration causes the stabilizers, which are at 90 degree angles, to reflect any incoming radar back at the source.

Internal flight control systems are able to be programmed to hold the TALD at certain speeds, or to perform certain maneuvers. This allows it to mimic certain aircraft, degrading the quality of the enemy's situational awareness. They could be, for example, programmed to mimic the speed and movements of the General Dynamics F-16 with the goal of making adversary SAM sites perceive a high-priority threat which is not there.

The addition of a Luneburg lens allows for incoming radar waves to be reflected back directly at the target, amplifying the radar returns. This leads to its perception as a much larger aircraft, such as bombers.

The missile could be launched from 12,200 metres (40,000 ft), at which height it had a range of up to 126 kilometres (78 mi); a low-altitude range reduced this to 26 kilometres (16 mi).

== Variants ==
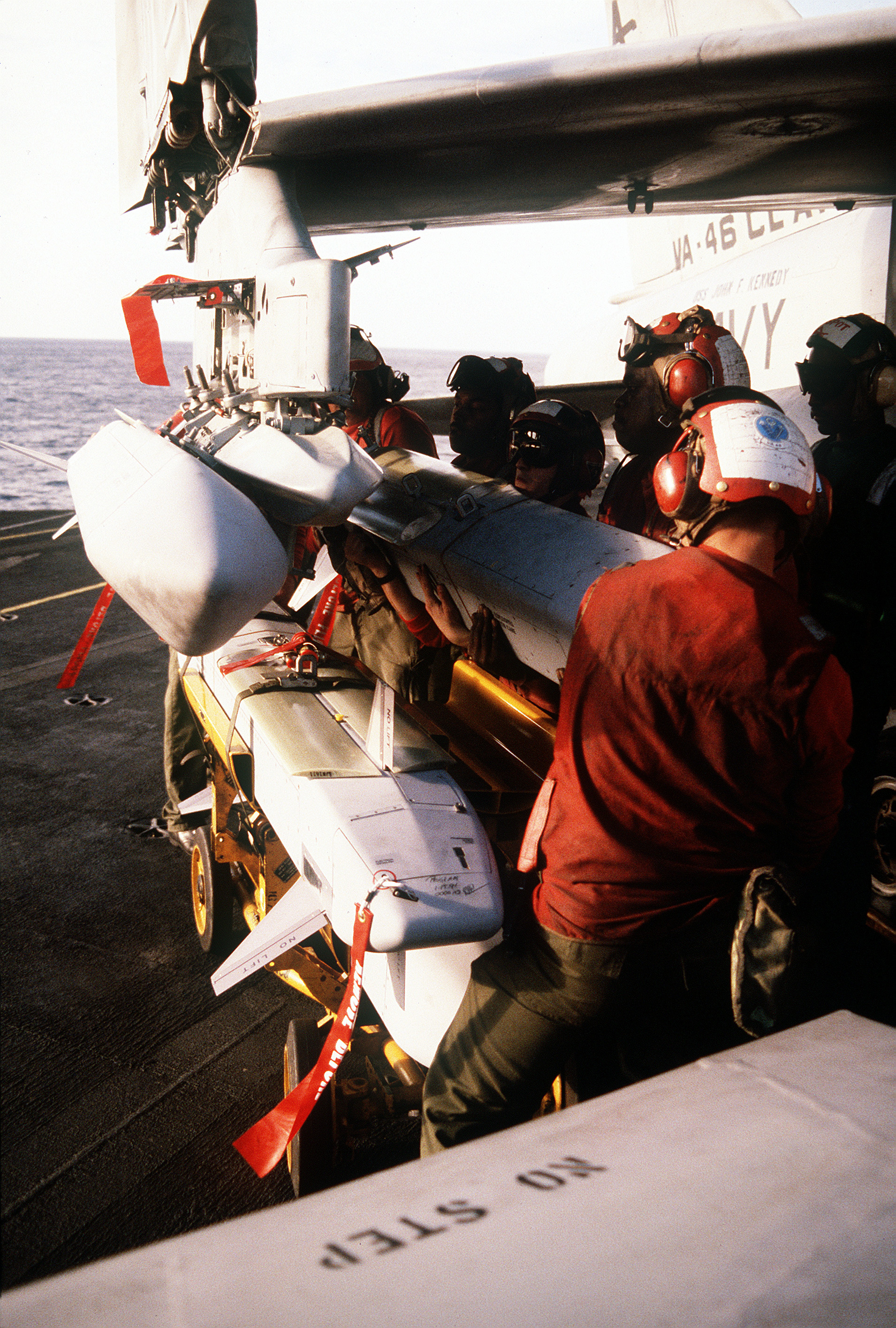
ADM-141 TALDs being loaded onto an A-7 Corsair II on 16 Jan 1991

The TALD was built in different versions.

=== TALD (Samson) ===
The initial batch of 500 Samsons purchased from Brunswick under a sole-source $10m contract by the US Navy were referred to as TALD, but did not receive a Tri-Service Designation. These were delivered between December 1985 and May 1986, and were photographed in March 1986 being fit-checked on the FA-18 Hornet.

=== ADM-141A ===
The ADM-141A has passive and active radar enhancers. An IR addon was fielded for a while, but was later withdrawn from service.

=== ADM-141B ===
The ADM-141B carries a 36 kg (80 lb) payload of chaff, to better mimic the behavior of aircraft.

=== ADM-141C ITALD ===
The "ADM-141C ITALD" is similar to TALD, but is fitted with a Teledyne CAE-312 turbofan engine, which provides 0.78 kN (80 kgp / 177 lbf) thrust and was developed for a cancelled anti-radar cruise missile named "Tacit Rainbow". ITALD has a ventral intake for the turbofan, and a radar altimeter so it can maintain low-level flight at a specified altitude over the ground.

ITALD has a speed of Mach 0.8 and range of 280 kilometers (175 miles) at altitude. It can be launched from the ground using a RATO booster, as well as air launched. First flights were in 1995, with trials completed in 1996. At that time, Brunswick got out of the defense business, but the project was picked up by IMI. Future ITALDs may feature a Global Positioning System / Inertial Navigation System (GPS-INS) autopilot.

— Greg Goebel - Unmanned Aerial Vehicles

The ADM-141C (ITALD) has the same passive and active radar enhancers as the ADM-141A TALD.

== Operations ==
The TALD was used with great success in the opening stages of Operation Desert Storm in 1991. More than 100 were launched on the opening night of the war. This prompted the Iraqi air defense to activate many of its radars, most of which were then destroyed by anti-radiation missiles.

The Improved TALD is powered by a Teledyne CAE Model 312 (J700-CA-400) turbojet. This boosted the range to more than 300 kilometres (190 mi) at high altitude and 185 kilometres (115 mi) at low altitude. This model was also capable of performing a flight profile resembling that of a real aircraft much more convincingly. Initially 20 TALDs were upgraded to ADM-141C ITALD configuration, with the first flight conducted in 1996. Since then the U.S. Navy has ordered over 200 ADM-141Cs.

The major user of the ADM-141 is the F/A-18 Hornet. Up to 6 decoys can be carried on a single stores pylon, using a pair of triple ejector racks.

== Specifications ==
- Length: 2.34 m (7 ft 8 in)
- Wingspan: 1.55 m (5 ft 1 in)
- Weight: 180 kg (400 lb)
- Speed: up to Mach 0.8 (460 km/h, 250 kn)
- Range: 126 km (78 mi), over 300 km (185 mi) for the ADM-141C
- Propulsion: Teledyne CAE J700-CA-400 turbojet, 790 N (177 lbf) on ADM-141C only

== See also ==
- List of missiles
- ADM-160 MALD
