= ADM-160 MALD =

US decoy missile

ADM-160 Miniature Air-Launched Decoy (MALD)
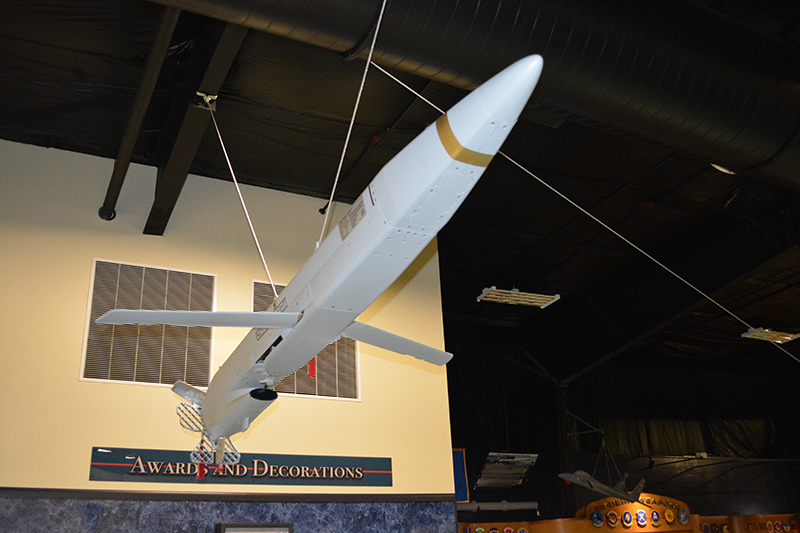
- ADM-160B, Air Force Armament Museum
- Type: Family of air-launched active radar decoy/jammer and payload bus aerial vehicles
- Place of origin: United States

Service history
- Used by: United States Air Force, United States Navy, Ukrainian Air Force
- Wars: Russo-Ukrainian War; Russian invasion of Ukraine

Production history
- Manufacturer: Raytheon Missile Systems

Specifications
- Mass: MALD: 279 lb (127 kg); MALD-J: 286 lb (130 kg) (est)
- Length: 9 ft 4 1/2 in (2.858 m)
- Width: 16.2 in (0.41 m)
- Height: 14.7 in (0.37 m)
- Wingspan: 5 ft 7 in (1.70 m)
- Engine: Pratt & Whitney TJ-150 turbojet 0.67 kN (150 lb_{f})
- Operational range: MALD: 500 nmi (580 mi; 930 km); MALD-J: 486 nmi (559 mi; 900 km)
- Maximum speed: Mach 0.9 (1,000 ft/s; 310 m/s)
- Guidance system: GPS, INS
- Launch platform: F-15, F-16, F-22, F-35, A-10, B-1B, B-52, P-8A Poseidon, MQ-1 Predator, MQ-9 Reaper, Mikoyan MiG-29 (Ukraine)
- References: Janes

External images
- Raytheon ADM-160C (MALD-J)
- Raytheon Corp.
- Raytheon Corp.

The ADM-160 MALD (Miniature Air-Launched Decoy) is an air-launched, expendable decoy missile developed by the United States. Later variants (MALD-J) are additionally equipped with electronic countermeasures to actively jam early warning and target acquisition radars. Its first known combat use was in May 2023 by the Ukrainian Air Force in the Russo-Ukrainian war.

== Overview ==
=== DARPA MALD program ===
The Miniature Air-Launched Decoy (MALD) program was begun in 1995 by DARPA in an effort to develop a small, low-cost decoy missile for use in the Suppression of Enemy Air Defenses (SEAD). In 1996, Teledyne Ryan, acquired by Northrop Grumman in 1999, was granted a development contract for the ADM-160A. In 1999, the first test flight took place. The evaluation program was finished by 2001.

The US Air Force planned to acquire several thousand of ADM-160As. In 2001, this was reduced to 150 at most, for a System Development and Demonstration (SDD) program. In January 2002, the USAF cancelled the program because the drone didn't have enough range and endurance to meet the service's requirements or to perform other missions.

The ADM-160A carries a Signature Augmentation Subsystem (SAS) of various active radar enhancers which cover a range of frequencies. The SAS can therefore simulate any aircraft, from the B-52 Stratofortress to the F-117 Nighthawk.

The missile has folded wings to allow more compact carriage. On launch the wings unfold and a TJ-50 turbojet propels the missile on a predetermined course, which is composed of up to 100 different waypoints. An inertial navigation system with GPS support keeps the MALD on course. Although preprogrammed before the aircraft leaves the ground, the course can be modified by the pilot at any point up to launch.

=== New USAF competition ===
In 2002, the USAF renewed its interest in an air-launched decoy and started a new industry-wide competition for a variant with greater endurance. In Spring 2003, the contract for a new MALD was awarded to Raytheon.

The Raytheon ADM-160B is similar in configuration to the ADM-160A, but has a trapezoidal fuselage cross section and is larger and heavier. It is powered by a Hamilton Sundstrand TJ-150, a more powerful variant of the TJ-50.

The first ADM-160B was delivered in Spring 2009. In 2010 an "operationally significant quantity" of the drones were delivered to the Air Force. The USAF at one time planned to procure about 1,500.

In 2008 a contract for a jamming variant MALD-J was awarded to Raytheon. It made its first freefall test in 2009 and passed its critical design review in early 2010. The first MALD-J was delivered to the Air Force on September 6, 2012. On September 24, Raytheon started operational testing, achieving four successful flights out of four launches. In April 2015, the MALD-J completed operational testing, satisfying all requirements in 42 flight tests over two years.

In November 2012, Raytheon completed ground verification tests for the MALD and MALD-J for integration onto the MQ-9 Reaper UAV. Integration onto the aircraft was expected sometime in 2013, with the goal for an unmanned SEAD capability. As of 2015, the company had also explored integration onto the smaller MQ-1 Predator and U.S. Army MQ-1C Gray Eagle.

In June 2013, Raytheon completed a four-year development program of the MALD, under budget. The MALD and MALD-J successfully completed all 30 engineering and operational flight tests, with each version completing 15. The Air Force has cleared the B-model MALD for export.

In May 2014, Raytheon delivered the 1,000th MALD-J to the Air Force as part of the Lot 5 production contract. The MALD program had achieved a perfect 33-for-33 flight test success record over the previous two years.

In December 2014, a MALD-J was test-flown with a radio datalink to expand situational awareness and allow for in-flight targeting adjustments. While carrying out a jamming mission, the MALD-J was able to send situation awareness data to the EW Battle Manager, which used the information to adjust its mission while in-flight.

In July 2015, Raytheon revealed it had developed a new composite missile body for the MALD-J in partnership with Fokker Aerostructures and Italian race car manufacturer Dallara that is 25% cheaper to produce. Fokker adapted robotics to wind the carbon fiber fuselage instead of the conventional manual process. Dallara applied its lightweight structural technologies to airframe accessories such as air inlets and covers. The new cheaper airframe design was first incorporated into Lot 7 production models in 2015, from the contract awarded in June 2014.

=== US Navy ===
The Naval Surface Warfare Center will place an order for the MALD-J.

In July 2012, systems integration was announced by Raytheon for the U.S. Navy's F/A-18E/F Super Hornet. The process included a series of risk reduction activities and technology demonstrations.

In September 2015, Raytheon and the Naval Research Lab announced they had demonstrated a new rapid-replacement, modular architecture for the MALD-J for electronic warfare payloads. Four payloads, each customized for a specific mission and threat, were demonstrated in twelve captive carry flights. The payloads could be swapped out of a captive carry vehicle in less than one minute.

In July 2016, Raytheon received a contract to develop an evolution of the MALD-J called the MALD-X, incorporating an improved electronic warfare payload, the ability to fly at low-altitude, and an enhanced net-enabled data-link. The company hopes to transition the MALD-X into the MALD-N for the U.S. Navy.

=== British interest ===
The British Ministry of Defence (MoD) expressed interest on the MALD-V platform at the Paris Airshow in 2009. However, since the early 2010s MBDA UK has been developing the SPEAR 3 miniature cruise missile for the Royal Air Force as well as SPEAR-EW, an electronic warfare variant which can conduct the same stand-in jamming and decoy role as the MALD whilst retaining commonality with the kinetic variant. With the UK MoD now fast-tracking the development of this variant, it is unlikely that the UK will buy into MALD.

== Operational history ==
=== Ukraine ===
In May 2023, remains of an ADM-160 MALD were found in Luhansk following a Ukrainian strike against a Russian target in the occupied city. A label on the side of the wreckage appears to indicate that it was a ADM-160B model.

In December 2023, the wreckage of an ADM-160 MALD was photographed in a field, reportedly in the Kherson region, after being launched in support of Storm Shadow cruise missiles. On 22 August 2025, the Ukrainian Air Force released a video showing how its Su-27 Flanker operate ADM-160 MALD decoy missiles. The video showed Su-27 aircraft carrying single MALD units on each inboard underwing hardpoint, using the same specialized pylons previously adapted for other Western-supplied guided munitions including French Hammer bombs and American JDAM-ER glide bombs.

According to Ukrainian pilots featured in the footage, the decoys are designed to "bear the brunt of the air defenses" and provide tactical deception, typically deployed in coordination with Storm Shadow and SCALP cruise missile strikes, as well as AGM-88 HARM anti-radiation missiles. This integration followed previous successful adaptation of MALD systems to Ukrainian MiG-29 Fulcrum fighters.

== Variants ==
ADM-160A
Original decoy version developed by Teledyne Ryan (acquired by Northrop Grumman) and funded by DARPA. It uses a GPS-aided navigation system, and can fly missions with up to 256 predefined waypoints. The mission profile is preprogrammed, but can be redefined by the pilot of the launching aircraft until immediately before launch.
ADM-160B
Decoy version developed by Raytheon with longer endurance. In use by the USAF.
ADM-160C "MALD-Jammer"
Radar jammer variant of ADM-160B by Raytheon, otherwise known as MALD-J. This variant of the MALD decoy can operate in both decoy and jammer modes. It has a datalink for situational awareness and in-flight targeting adjustments. The decoy and jammer configurations are key enablers supporting the Air Force Global Strike, Global Response, Space and C4ISR, and the Air and Space Expeditionary Force Concepts of Operations. MALD-J will provide stand-in jamming capability for the Airborne Electronic Attack Systems of Systems. It will be launched against a preplanned target and jam specific radars in a stand-in role to degrade or deny the integrated air defence system (IADS) detection of friendly aircraft or munitions. Delivery to the US Armed Forces is to begin in 2012. That year, the Air Force ended procurement of the ADM-160B and will only procure MALD-J versions.

=== Experimental variants ===
MALI
The Miniature Air-Launched Interceptor (MALI) is an armed version of the ADM-160A which could be used against cruise missiles. It has a more powerful engine and a more aerodynamic shape for supersonic flight, and can be updated in mid flight via a command link to aircraft such as the E-3 Sentry AWACS. It completed its development program in 2002.
MALD-V
Modular payload version that provides space for mission specific payloads of surveillance gear, radio/radar/infrared jammers or other equipment. This may provide the go-forward architecture, and give the option of turning MALD into a UAV, or even a combination killer-UAV/decoy. If equipped with sensor payloads, the MALD may be modified to be recovered so as not to lose valuable payloads after each flight. One payload option could be a thermobaric warhead, essentially turning the MALD into a cruise missile.
Raytheon has proposed using MALD-V as a target drone too.
MALD-TL
Ground-based tube-launch variant, none known to be in use. Mentioned in 2008 and 2010. Other "one-off" variants in the 2010 slides include a "MALD-W" and a "MALD-A".
MALD-X
The MALD-X has enhanced electronic warfare capabilities compared to MALD-J. It is able to attack autonomously or semi-autonomously. Datalink upgraded. Successful test in 2018.
MALD-N
Navy variant based on the MALD-J.
HAMMER
Proposed ground-launched multi-role loitering missile developed by Raytheon, unveiled at the 2009 AUSA exhibition. A low-cost, land based loitering weapon system, based on the MALD family, extending the Army’s electronic attack and Suppression of Enemy Air Defense capability. The missile was to use existing MLRS/HIMARS launchers, each loading one (HIMARS) or two (M270) six-pack containers.

== Launch platforms ==
- Current:
  - General Dynamics F-16 Fighting Falcon
  - Boeing B-52 Stratofortress
  - Fairchild Republic A-10C Thunderbolt II
  - Sukhoi Su-27
- Probable:
  - Mikoyan MiG-29
- Future and potential:
  - Boeing F/A-18E/F Super Hornet
  - Lockheed C-130 Hercules
  - Boeing C-17 Globemaster III
  - Bell Boeing V-22 Osprey
  - McDonnell Douglas AV-8B Harrier II
  - Eurofighter Typhoon
  - General Atomics MQ-1 Predator
  - General Atomics MQ-1C Gray Eagle
  - General Atomics MQ-9 Reaper
  - Saab JAS 39 Gripen E

== Specifications (Northrop Grumman ADM-160A) ==
- Length : 2.38 m (7 ft 10 in)
- Wingspan : 0.65 m (2 ft 2 in)
- Diameter : 15 cm (6 in)
- Weight : 45 kg (100 lb)
- Speed : Mach 0.8
- Ceiling : Over 9,000 m (30,000 ft)
- Range : Over 460 km (285 mi)
- Endurance : Over 20 min
- Propulsion : Hamilton Sundstrand TJ-50 turbojet; 220 N (50 lbf) thrust
- Unit cost : US$30,000

== Specifications (Raytheon ADM-160B) ==
- Length : 2.84 m (9 ft 7 in)
- Wingspan : 1.71 m (5 ft 7 in) fully extended
- Weight : 115 kg (250 lb)
- Speed : Mach 0.91
- Ceiling : Over 12,200 m (40,000 ft)
- Range : Approximately 920 km (575 mi) with ability to loiter over target
- Endurance : Over 45 min at altitude
- Propulsion : Hamilton Sundstrand TJ-150 turbojet
- Unit cost : US$120,000 (initial), US$322,000 (as of 2015)

== See also ==
- List of missiles
- ADM-141 TALD – (United States, Israel)
- Delilah – (Israel)
- SPEAR-EW – (United Kingdom)
