= Fairchild J83 =

American turbojet engine

J83
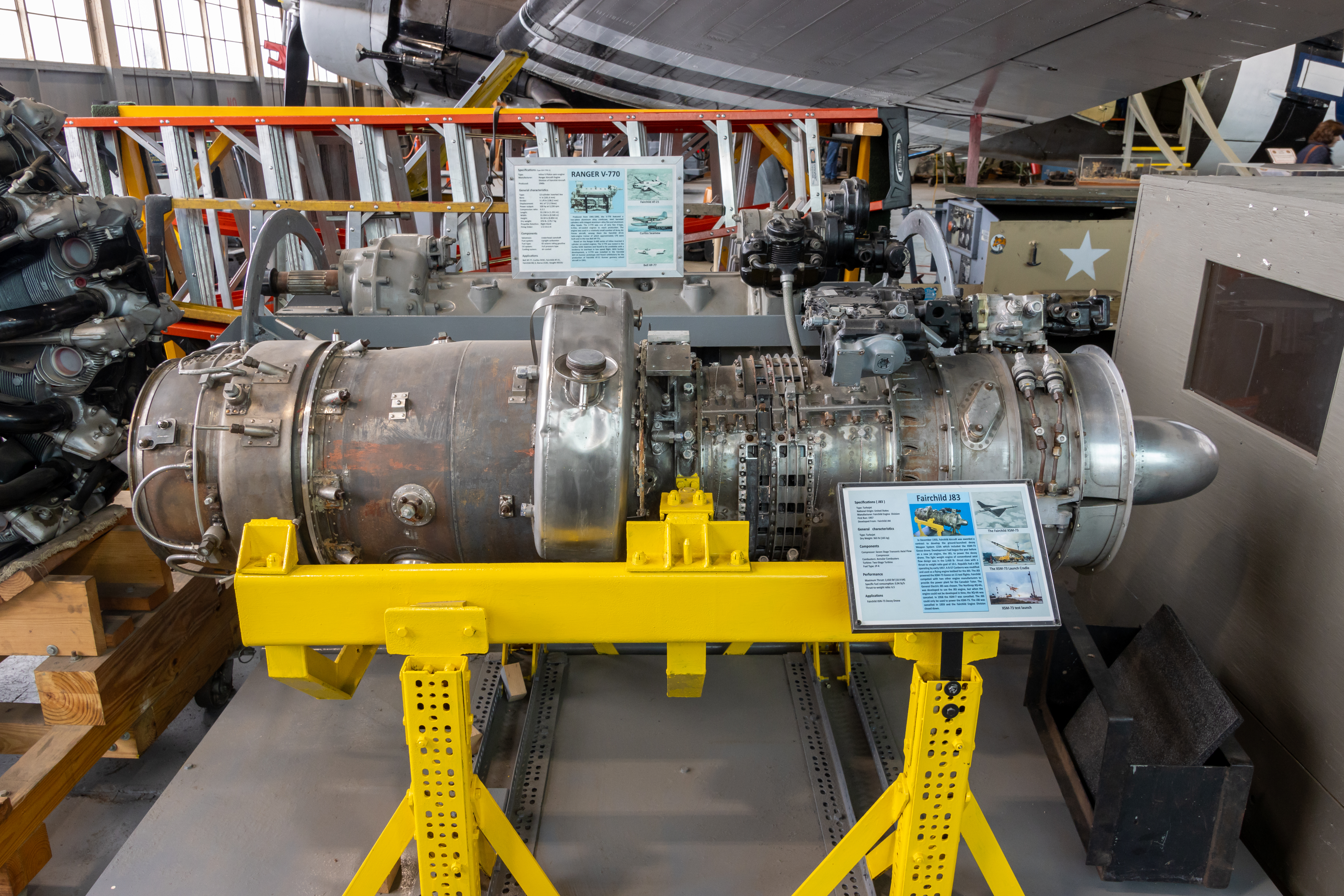
- J83 engine on display at the American Airpower Museum
- Type: Turbojet
- National origin: United States
- Manufacturer: Fairchild Engine Division
- First run: 1950s
- Major applications: XSM-73 Goose
- Developed from: Fairchild J44

The Fairchild J83 turbojet was developed starting in 1955 to power cruise missiles used as un-armed decoys for bomber aircraft. The engine's development was terminated in November 1958.

== Design and development ==
In March 1953, the United States Air Force released General Operational Requirement (GOR) 16, which called air- and ground-launched decoy missiles to increase the effectiveness of Strategic Air Command bombers by confusing and saturating an air defense system. In December 1955, Fairchild was awarded a contract to develop the ground-launched decoy Weapon System 123A which included the XSM-73 Goose. McDonnell Aircraft was chosen in February 1956 to build the ADM-20 Quail air-launched decoy.

Two engine contracts were awarded in November 1954 to minimize development risk for both decoys. Each engine was in the 2,450 lbf (10.9 kN) thrust class with a thrust to weight ratio goal of 10:1. General Electric was awarded a contract for the development of the J85 and Fairchild was awarded a contract for a competing engine, the J83. Fairchild proposed a lightweight engine of conventional design. GE used a more advanced design which yielded a higher thrust to weight ratio.

A J83 was operating by early 1957. A B-57 Canberra was modified and used as a flying engine testbed for the J83. The J83 powered the XSM-73 Goose on 15 test flights.

Fairchild competed with two other engine manufacturers to provide the powerplant for the Canadair Tutor. A license-built J85 was chosen. The Northrop XQ-4A, was developed to use the J83 engine, but when the engine could not be developed in time the XQ-4A was canceled.

In November 1958, the J83 was canceled one month before the XSM-73. The USAF determined that the J85 had a higher probability of meeting the desired performance goals. The J85 could also be used to power the ADM-20 Quail decoy, the XSM-73 missile, and the T-38 Talon trainer. The J83 could only be used to power the XSM-73.

After the J83 was canceled, Fairchild had no other applications for the engine. As a result, operations at the Fairchild Engine Division plant at Deer Park in Long Island ended in the summer of 1959.

The McDonnell 119, an unsuccessful early business jet, was originally designed in 1957 to use the J83, but McDonnell had to modify the prototype to accept the Westinghouse J34 after the termination of the J83 program.

== Applications ==
- XSM-73 Goose
- Northrop XQ-4A (never built)
- McDonnell 119 (redesigned to accept alternate engines)

== Specifications ==
==== General characteristics ====
- Type: turbojet
- Length:
- Diameter:
- Dry weight: 363 lb (165 kg)

==== Components ====
- Compressor: seven stage transonic axial flow compressor
- Combustors: annular combustor
- Turbine: two-stage turbine
- Fuel type: JP-4

==== Performance ====
- Maximum thrust: 2,450 lbf (10.9 kN)
- Specific fuel consumption: 0.94 lb/(lbf⋅h) or 27 g/(kN⋅s)
- Thrust-to-weight ratio: 6.5

== See also ==
Related development

- Fairchild J44

Comparable engines

- General Electric J85

Related lists

- List of aircraft engines
