= McDonnell 119 =

Four-engined US business jet prototype, 1959

McDonnell 119 / 220
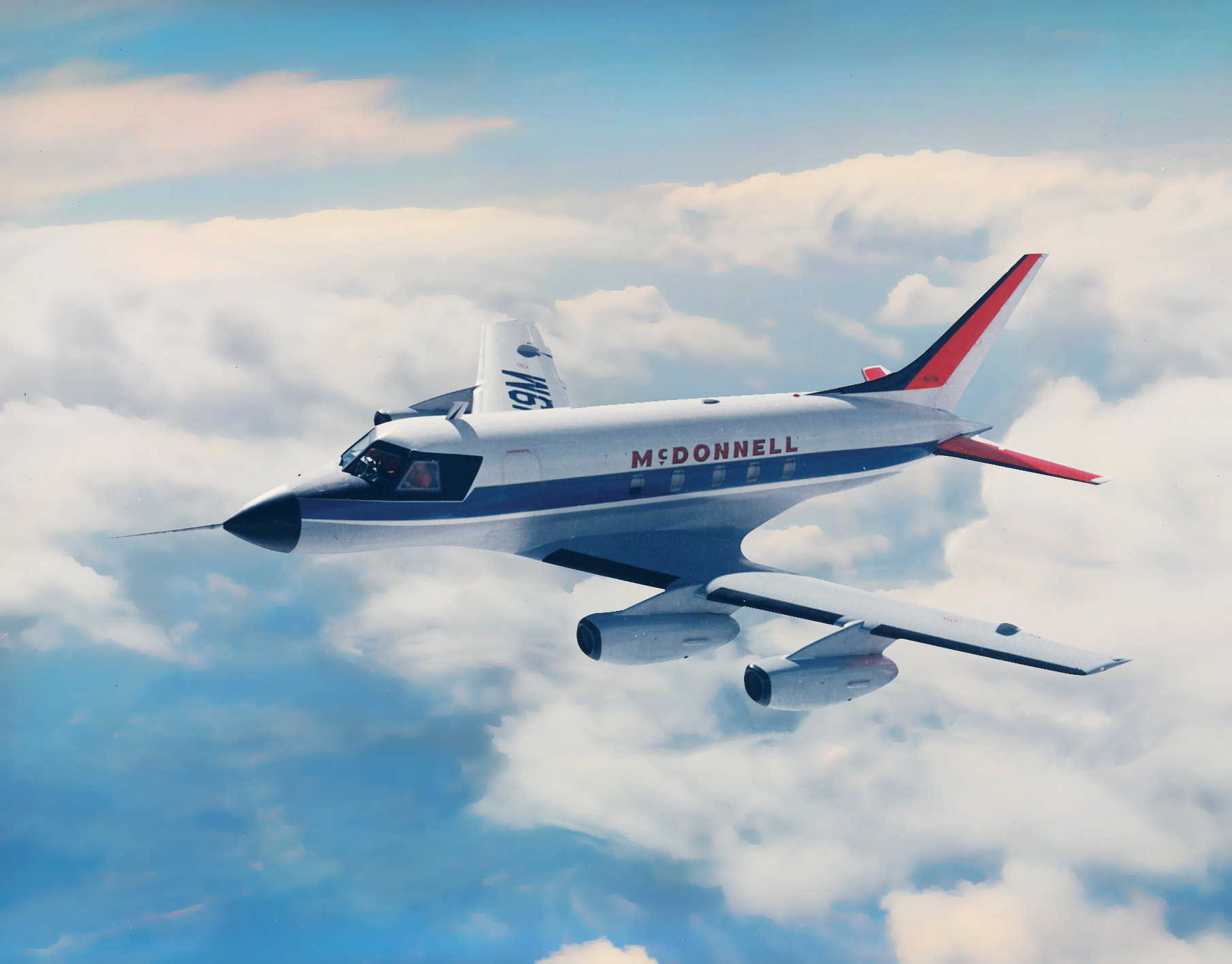

General information
- Type: Business jet
- National origin: United States
- Manufacturer: McDonnell Aircraft
- Status: Retired
- Number built: 1

History
- First flight: 11 February 1959

The McDonnell 119, later redesignated the 220, is a business jet developed and unsuccessfully marketed by McDonnell Aircraft in the late 1950s and early 1960s. Its configuration is unique for this type of aircraft, with four podded engines underneath a low wing. It is the only airplane built by McDonnell Aircraft to be marketed to civil buyers prior to the company's merger with Douglas Aircraft to form McDonnell Douglas. (Note: McDonnell Aircraft also marketed proposed civil versions of the Bréguet 941 transport as the 188 and 188E but never built either aircraft; a French-built 941 was sponsored for Bréguet to perform promotional flights in the U.S.) The jet could be outfitted for 10 passengers in a luxury executive configuration and could carry as many as 29.

== Design and development ==
External image
- The 220 – promotional film covering the features of the aircraft

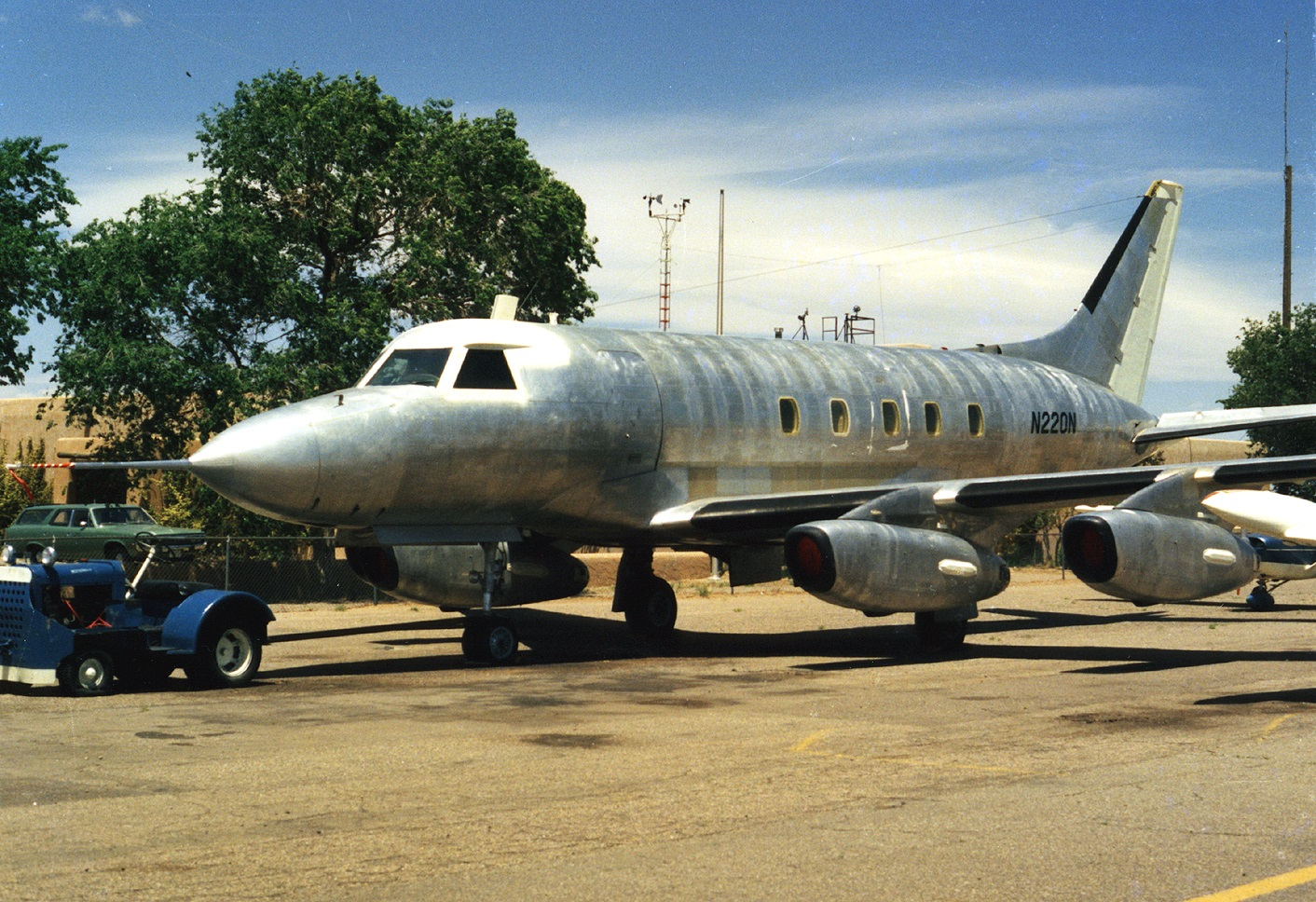
McDonnell 220, Albuquerque 1975

The Model 119 was designed in 1957 for the U.S. Air Force's UCX (Utility-Cargo Experimental) contract announced in August 1956, competing with the Lockheed JetStar. McDonnell entered the UCX competition with an eye on commercial sales; the company had never produced a civil aircraft.

Designed for a 2,200 nmi (2,500 mi; 4,100 km) range at 550 kn (630 mph; 1,020 km/h) airspeed against a 70 kn (81 mph; 130 km/h) headwind, the 119 had a wing sweep of 35 degrees. Critical field length on takeoff was 3,930 ft (1,200 m) to 5,255 ft (1,602 m), while the advertised landing roll was 1,800 ft (550 m) to 2,050 ft (620 m). Roll control was provided by conventional ailerons, a combination of split flaps and Fowler flaps were used to enhance low-speed control, and the wings were equipped with spoilers that doubled as speed brakes. The cabin floor had tracks to allow interior fitments to be changed quickly to suit different missions; the aircraft could be used for medical evacuation, with room for 12 stretchers and two attendants, and McDonnell also promoted it as a trainer for bombardiers, flight navigators, radar operators, or electronic countermeasure technicians. Having invested over $10 million in company funds in the program, McDonnell initiated the formation of commercial sales and transport divisions to promote the 119, but company founder James Smith McDonnell was unwilling to commit to full-scale production until sizable orders were received.

Completion of the prototype was delayed until 1959 due to the cancellation of the intended Fairchild J83 engine. Fitted with Westinghouse J34 turbojets for flight test purposes, the 119 was first flown on 11 February 1959, but the Air Force rejected it later that year in favor of the Lockheed JetStar (designated C-140), citing concerns about foreign object damage with the 119's low-mounted engines. Following this setback, McDonnell continued to market the type commercially, renaming it the 220 to commemorate McDonnell's second 20 years of business, and showing it in a 10-place luxury configuration and a more basic configuration with 29 passenger seats. McDonnell drew up plans to equip production models with more modern Pratt & Whitney JT12 or General Electric CF700 engines, and the 220 was awarded a Federal Aviation Administration (FAA) type certificate on 17 October 1960.

The company made a provisional deal with Pan American World Airways to lease 170 of the jets, but no other orders materialized, and McDonnell was ultimately unable to offer the aircraft to Pan Am at an attractive price; consequently, the airline rejected the aircraft in favor of the Dassault-Breguet Mystère 20, and no further production ensued. The McDonnell Corporation subsequently used the prototype as a VIP transport before selling it in March 1965 to the Flight Safety Foundation, which used it for crash survival tests and other research in Phoenix, Arizona. By the mid-1970s, the aircraft was stripped of its previous research markings and repainted for a new owner. The jet was subsequently rumored to have been used for covert missions in Latin America before winding up derelict in Albuquerque.

As of 2019, the single prototype was still extant, owned by Floatron Inc. and registered as N4AZ and stored at El Paso International Airport. FAA records show that in January 2022, the aircraft was sold.

== Specifications (McDonnell 220) ==
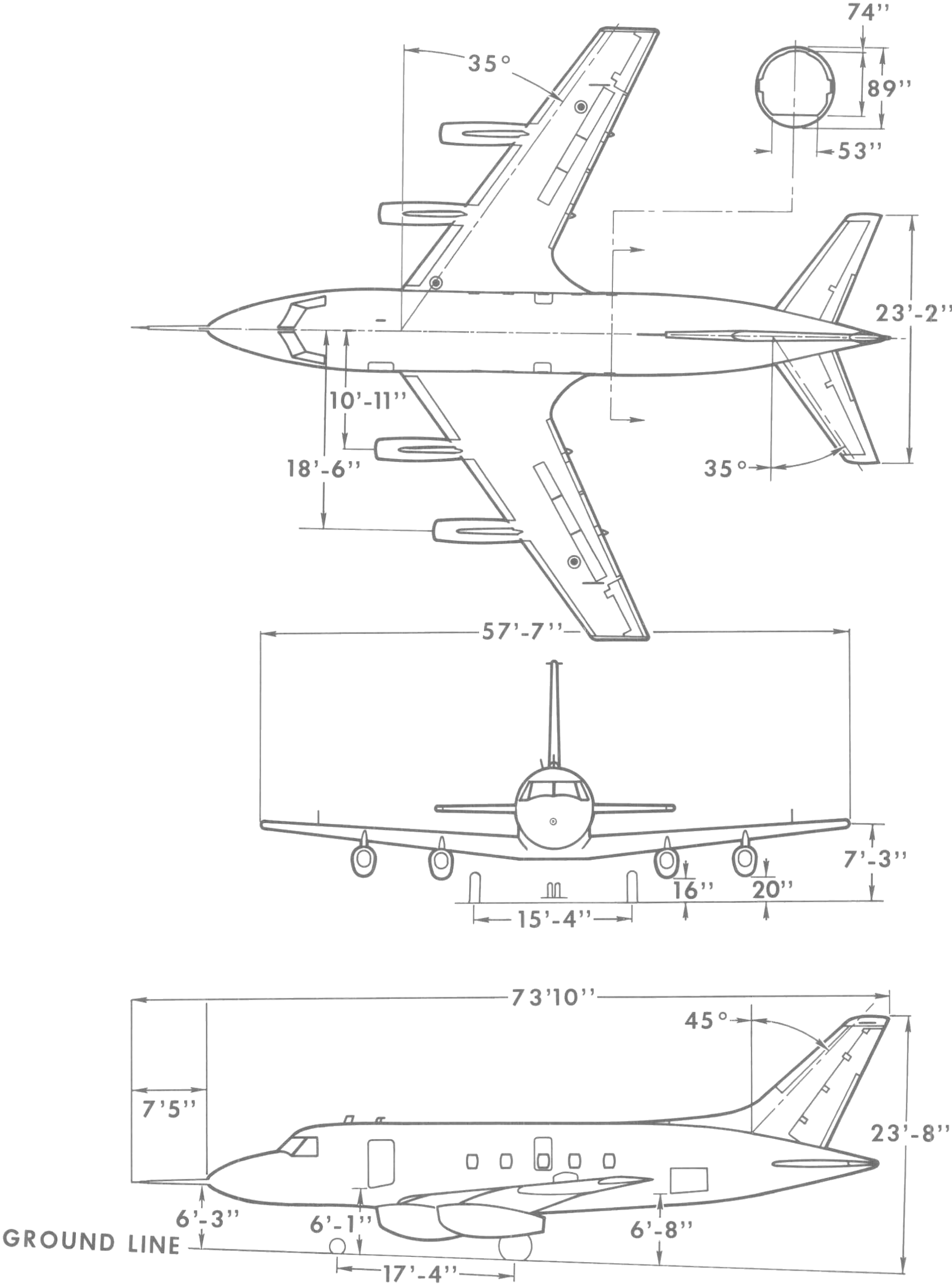
3-view silhouette drawing of the McDonnell 220

Data from McDonnell Douglas Aircraft since 1920

General characteristics

- Capacity: 10–29 passengers depending on cabin layout
- Length: 66 ft 6 in (20.27 m)
- Wingspan: 57 ft 7.25 in (17.55 m)
- Height: 23 ft 7.75 in (7.21 m)
- Wing area: 550 sq ft (51.10 m^{2})
- Empty weight: 23,213 lb (10,529 kg)
- Gross weight: 40,928 lb (18,565 kg)
- Max takeoff weight: 45,328 lb (20,560 kg)
- Powerplant: 4 × Westinghouse J34-WE-22 turbojet, 2,980 lbf (13.3 kN) thrust each as installed in prototype; production aircraft would have used Pratt & Whitney JT12 or General Electric CF700

Performance

- Maximum speed: 560 mph (901 km/h, 490 kn) at 38,000 ft (11,580 m)
- Cruise speed: 520 mph (837 km/h, 450 kn)
- Range: 2,340 mi (3,765 km, 2,030 nmi)
- Service ceiling: 44,900 ft (13,685 m)
- Wing loading: 74.4 lb/sq ft (363.3 kg/m^{2})
- Thrust/weight: 3.4 lb/lb st (3.4 kg/kgp)

== See also ==
Aircraft of comparable role, configuration, and era

- Dassault Falcon 20
- Lockheed JetStar
- North American Sabreliner
