= AQM =

AQM or Aqm may refer to:

- Active queue management, a technique for Internet routers that consists in dropping or marking packets before its queue is full
- Abstract Query Model, a model for the structure and evaluation semantics of a query in JCR according to JSR-283; See Content repository API for Java
- Air quality management, in environmental engineering
- Alfonso Quiñónez Molina, known by initials "AQM"

== See also ==
- Al-Qaeda in the Islamic Maghreb (AQIM or AQMI), a radical Islamist militia which aims to overthrow the Algerian government and institute an Islamic state
- AQM missiles, for example the Northrop AQM-35
