= Hall Monoped =

Monoped
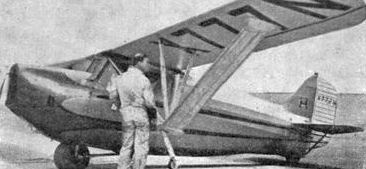
- A forward oblique photo of the Monoped from L'Aerophile, June 1932

General information
- Type: Civil utility aircraft
- National origin: United States
- Manufacturer: Hall-Aluminum Aircraft Company
- Designer: Charles W. Hall
- Number built: 1

The Hall Monoped was a prototype civil utility aircraft built by the Hall-Aluminium Aircraft Company during the 1930s. It used a tandem landing gear configuration. The aircraft was destroyed in a crash in August 1936 that killed its designer, Charles W. Hall.

== Specifications (approximate) ==
Data from General Dynamics Aircraft and Their Predecessors

General characteristics

- Length: 25 ft (7.6 m)
- Wingspan: 32 ft (9.8 m)
- Powerplant: 1 × Ranger 390 , 125 hp (93 kW)

Performance

- Maximum speed: 130 mph (210 km/h, 110 kn)

== Bibliography ==
- Boyne, Walter (September 2003). "L'avions unijam biste: Hall "Monoped"" [The One-Legged Aircraft: The Hall Monoped]. Le Fana de l'Aviation (in French) (406): 52–53. ISSN 0757-4169.
- Wegg, John (1990). General Dynamics Aircraft and their Predecessors. Annapolis, Maryland: Naval Institute Press. ISBN 0-87021-233-8.
