= Rolls-Royce Soar =

Turbojet cruise missile engine

Soar
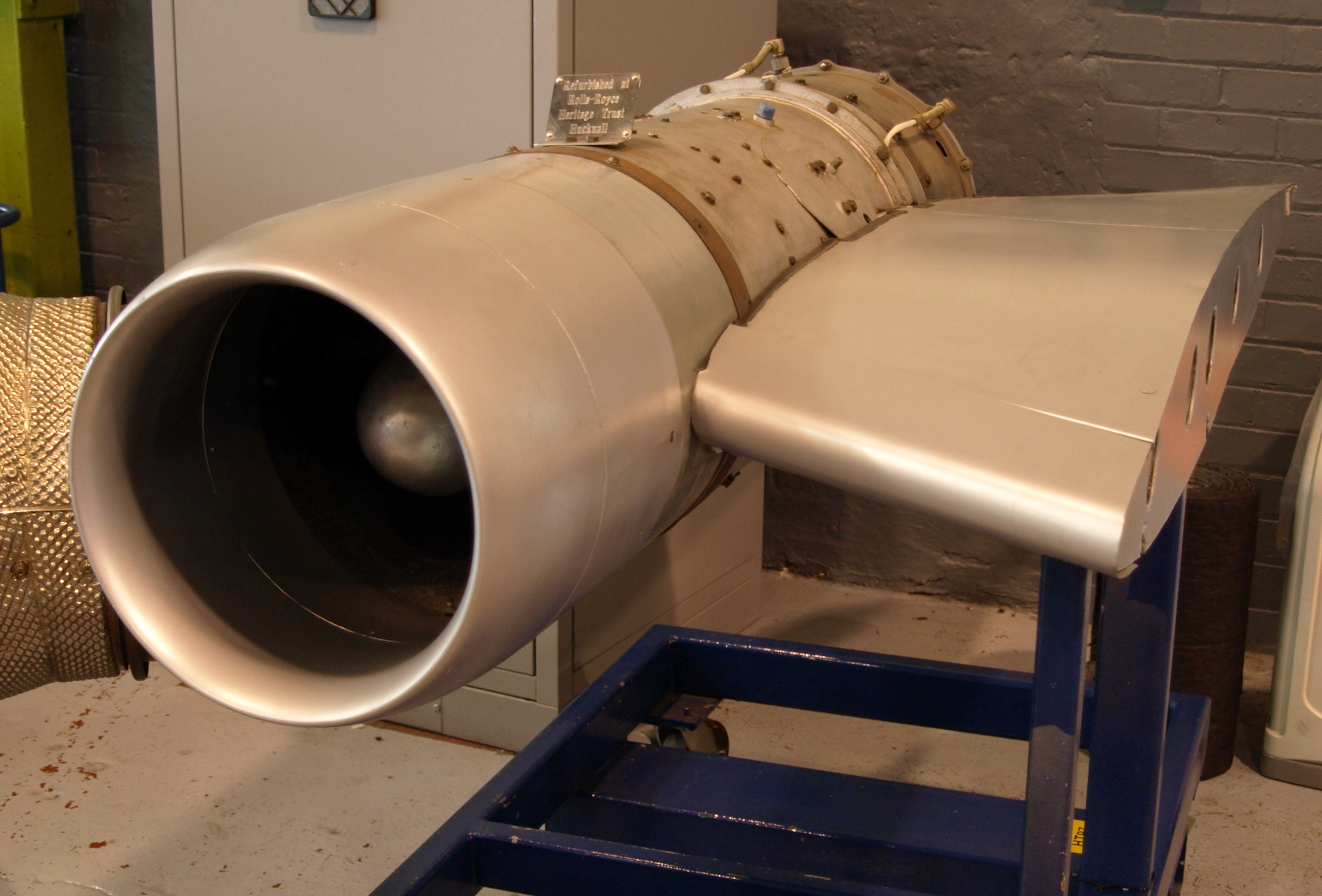
- Rolls-Royce Soar on display at the Rolls-Royce Heritage Trust, Derby
- Type: Turbojet
- Manufacturer: Rolls-Royce Limited
- First run: January 1953
- Developed into: Rolls-Royce RB108

The Rolls-Royce RB.93 Soar, also given the Ministry of Supply designation RSr., was a small, expendable British axial-flow turbojet intended for the UB.109T cruise missile use and built by Rolls-Royce Limited in the 1950s and 1960s. Like all the company's gas turbine engines it was named after a British river, in this case, the River Soar. It was also produced under licence in the US as the Westinghouse J81.

== Design and development ==
The Soar was developed as part of the Short Range Expendable Bomber cruise missile program of 1950. This called for a surface-to-surface missile similar to the V-1 flying bomb but jet-powered to provide much longer range, and using a new radio navigation system to give it the required accuracy at these extended ranges. Two designs were proposed, Bristol Aircraft's Blue Rapier and Vickers-Armstrongs' Red Rapier.

Red Rapier was selected as the winner after Winston Churchill returned to power in late 1951. The Vickers concept was similar to the original V-1, with a mostly cylindrical fuselage, straight wings, and conventional tail surfaces. Power was provided by three small engines located at the tips of the tail surfaces. Rolls-Royce was selected to build the engines, whilst the Telecommunications Research Establishment (TRE) began development of the guidance system. Designed to be expendable, the powerplant had a design life of 10 hours for a Red Rapier flight time of about 1 hour (range 400 nautical miles at 475 knots).

Red Rapier had been conceived as an emergency program as it was believed the Soviets were planning to start a war in 1953, before the Royal Air Force's new jet-powered bombers would be in service. As the date approached and it became clear no such attack was looming, combined with the good progress on the V-bomber designs, the program, now known as UB.109T, was cancelled. By this time the engine was running and was demonstrated at the Farnborough Airshow in 1953 on each wingtip of a Gloster Meteor flying testbed.

== Applications ==
Development of the Soar continued for a time despite the cancellation of the UB.109T program. It was the smallest aero-engine ever made by Rolls-Royce and was an extremely simple engine with very few parts. Its starting and control systems were almost non-existent. Lessons learned in producing the Soar at low weight and cost would be applied to the next light-weight engine, the RB108 lift engine.

Looking to power a target drone design, Lockheed contracted Westinghouse to provide a similar engine. They licensed the Soar from Rolls, as the Westinghouse J81. This powered the AQM-35 missile.

It was also employed as an auxiliary powerplant for the Italian Aerfer Ariete fighter design and also considered as a JATO powerplant for other aircraft.

The Soar project was cancelled in March 1965, at a reported total cost of £1.2 million.

== Specifications (RB.93 Soar) ==
Data from Rolls-Royce Aero Engines

==== General characteristics ====
- Type: Single-spool turbojet
- Length:
- Diameter: 15.8 in (401 mm)
- Dry weight: 267 lb (121 kg)

==== Components ====
- Compressor: 7-stage axial
- Combustors: Annular
- Turbine: Single stage

==== Performance ====
- Maximum thrust: 8.05 kN (1,810 lbf)
- Overall pressure ratio: 4.9
- Air mass flow: 13.47 kg/s (30 lb/s)
- Thrust-to-weight ratio: 6.97

== See also ==
Related development

- Rolls-Royce RB108

Related lists

- List of aircraft engines
