= Fairchild J44 =

American turbojet engine

J44
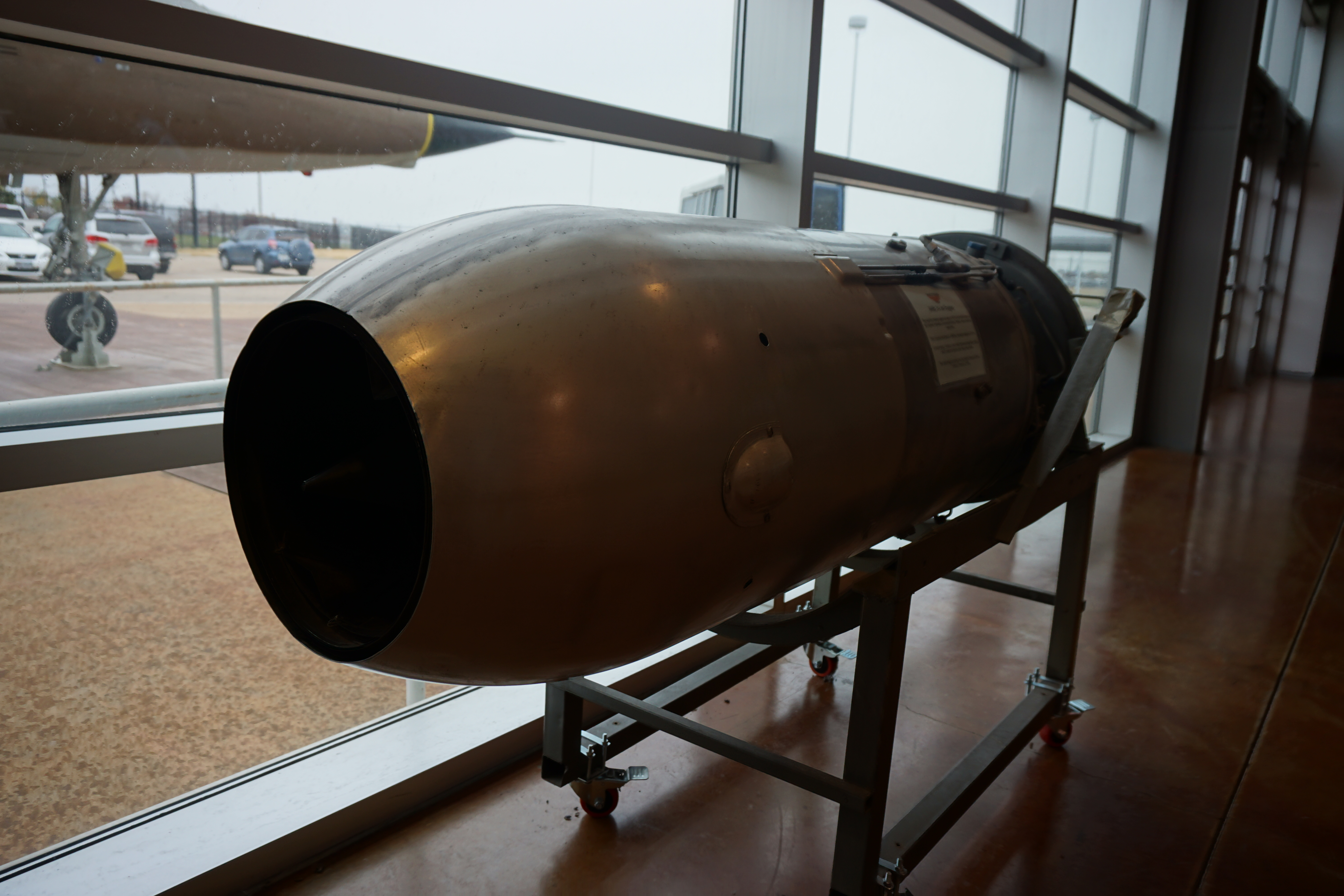
- A Fairchild J44R-24 on display at the Frontiers of Flight Museum
- Type: Turbojet
- National origin: United States
- Manufacturer: Fairchild Engine Division
- First run: August 1948
- Major applications: Ryan AQM-34 Firebee; C-123 Provider
- Developed into: Fairchild J83

The Fairchild J44 was a small expendable turbojet developed in the 1940s by the Fairchild Engine Division.

== Design and development ==
The Fairchild Engine Division (previously the Ranger Aircraft Engine Division of the Fairchild Engine & Aircraft Corporation) began development of the J44 in 1947. It was used in target drones, missiles, and as jet boosters on several aircraft types.

== Applications ==
- Ryan AQM-34 Firebee (B/C)
- Fairchild AQM-41 Petrel
- Bell Model 65
- Fairchild C-123 Provider
- Fairchild C-82 Packet

== Variants ==
Data from: Aircraft engines of the World 1953, Flight 20 March 1959 :AERO ENGINES 1959 . . ., Aircraft engines of the World 1957

XJ44
Prototypes of the J44
J44-R-1
United States Air Force (USAF) engine, similar to the United States Navy (USN) -6, 950 lbf (4.2 kN).
J44-R-2
Same as -6 but with different installation.
J44-R-3
Longer life - Fairchild C-123 Provider wing-tip boosters.
J44-R-6
USN version, 950 lbf (4.2 kN).
J44-R-12
expendable.
J44-R-20B
Ryan Firebee.
J44-R-24
Fairchild Petrel.
J44-R-26
1,100 lbf (4.9 kN) company sponsored variant.
FT-101E
Commercial version of -3.
FT-101-G
Commercial version with return oil system.

== Specifications(J44-R-3) ==
Data from Jane's all the World's Aircraft 1955-56, Minijets: Fairchild J44, Turbojet History and Development 1930-1960 Volume 2, Aircraft engines of the World 1957

==== General characteristics ====
- Type: turbojet
- Length: 90.4 in (2,300 mm)
- Diameter: 24.3 in (620 mm)
- Dry weight: 370 lb (170 kg) dry, complete

==== Components ====
- Compressor: single stage axial/centrifugal flow compressor
- Combustors: annular combustion chamber with 12 burner nozzles
- Turbine: single-stage axial-flow turbine
- Fuel type: JP-4
- Oil system: Oil-mist total loss

==== Performance ====
- Maximum thrust: 1,000 lbf (4.45 kN) static thrust at 15,780 rpm
- Overall pressure ratio: 2.7:1
- Air mass flow: 25 lb/s (11 kg/s) at 15,780 rpm
- Specific fuel consumption: 1.55 lb/(lbf⋅h) (44 g/(kN⋅s))
- Thrust-to-weight ratio: 2.9

== See also ==
Related development

- Fairchild J83

Related lists

- List of aircraft engines
