= Lockheed JetStar =

American four-engined executive transport jet

JetStar
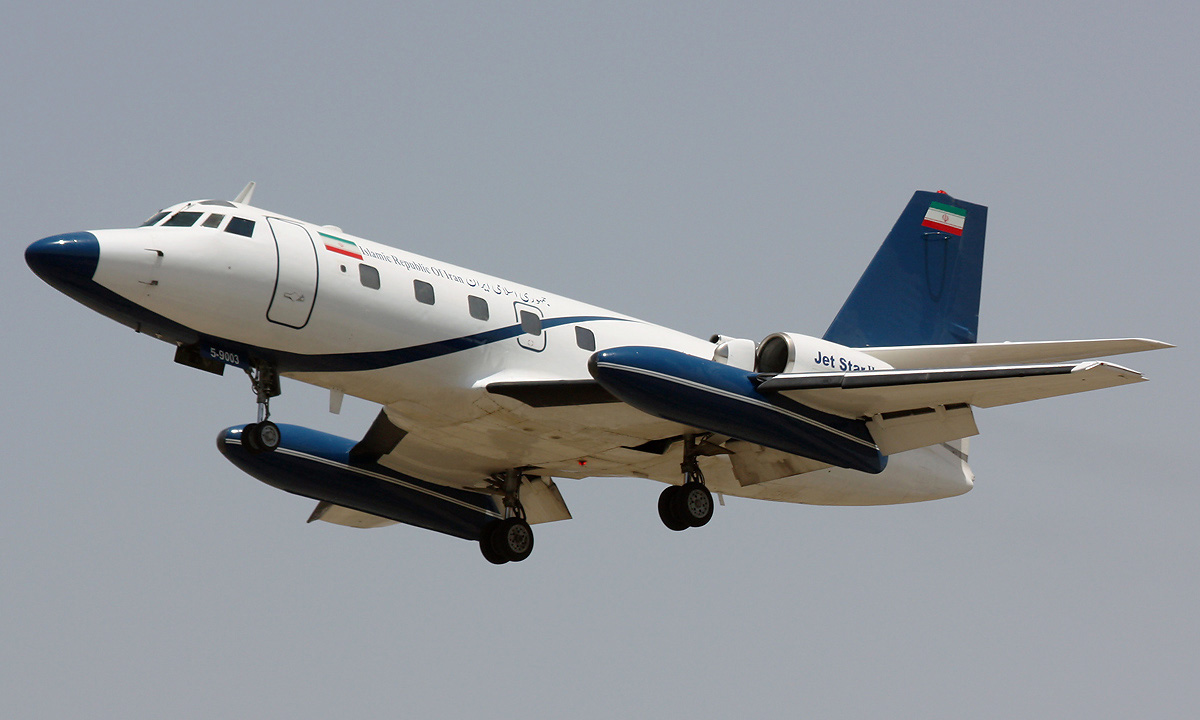
- An Islamic Republic of Iran Air Force JetStar

General information
- Type: Transport
- National origin: United States
- Manufacturer: Lockheed Corporation
- Status: In limited service
- Primary users: United States Air Force (historical) Mexican Air Force; Islamic Republic of Iran Air Force
- Number built: 202

History
- Manufactured: 1961–1980
- Introduction date: 1961
- First flight: 4 September 1957
- Retired: 1990s (United States Air Force)

The Lockheed JetStar (company designations L-329 and L-1329; designated C-140 in US military service) is a business jet designed and produced by the American aerospace manufacturer Lockheed. It was amongst the first dedicated private jets to enter service, as well as the only such airplane to be developed by Lockheed.

Designed during the late 1950s as a private venture by Lockheed, the JetStar featured a swept wing and a cruciform tail. It could be visually distinguished from most other small jets by its use of four engines, mounted on the rear of the fuselage, as well as the large "slipper"-style fuel tanks fixed to the wings, which extend both in front and aft of the wing. On 4 September 1957, the first prototype made its maiden flight. Originally powered by a pair of Bristol Siddeley Orpheus turbojet engines, Lockheed opted to re-engine the second prototype with four Pratt & Whitney JT12 turbojets; it was in this configuration that the type entered commercial service in 1961. The JetStar was amongst the largest aircraft in its class for many years, seating up to ten passengers along with its two crew. During the 1970s, in response to noise regulations and the JT12's high fuel consumption, the 731 JetStar modernisation programme and the JetStar II were introduced, which adopted newer Garrett TFE731 turbofan engines along with a revised external fuel tank design and modernised cockpit.

Amongst the buyers of the JetStar were several celebrities and public figures, including Elvis Presley, Bob Hope, Frank Sinatra, and Richard Nixon. One of the largest customers was the United States Air Force (USAF), which procured the C-140As as flight inspection aircraft and communication relays for the Air Force Communications Service, and the C-140B for transporting personnel for the Military Airlift Command, several of which became VIP transports and thus redesignated as VC-140Bs and were occasionally used as Air Force One during the 1970s and 1980s. Several other countries, such as Germany and Canada, transported their heads of state and other VIPs using JetStars. The last operational JetStar was retired in December 2019.

== Development ==
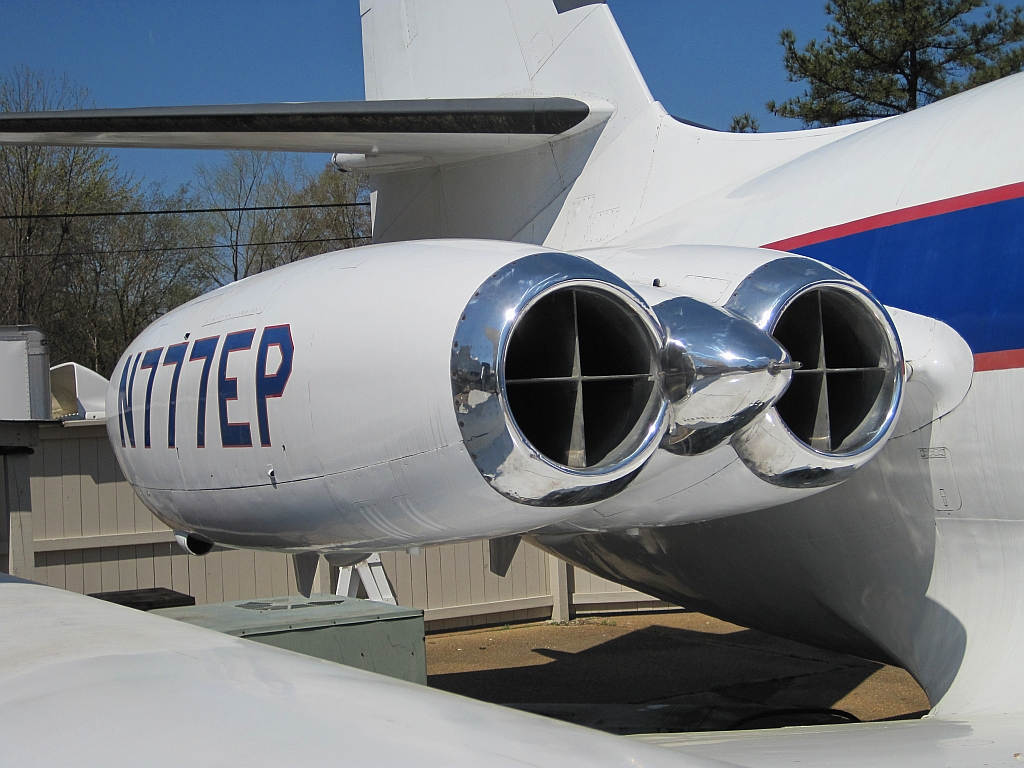
The dual engine pods on each side

The JetStar originated as a private project within Lockheed, although the company had envisioned submitting it to fulfil a United States Air Force (USAF) requirement that was later dropped due to budget cuts. Irrespective, Lockheed decided to continue independently working on the aircraft and to target it towards the civil sector. The design process formally commenced on 6 January 1957. Development of the Jetstar was worked on by Lockheed's noted aircraft engineer Kelly Johnson.

On 4 September 1957, the first prototype conducted its maiden flight over Burbank, California, only 241 days after design work had commenced. The first two prototypes were powered by a pair of Bristol Siddeley Orpheus turbojet engines, The second prototype was the first to be equipped with the wing-mounted "slipper tanks", which had originally been intended to be an option. Lockheed attempted to secure a licence to produce the Orpheus in the US, however, these negotiations ultimately failed. In response, the company opted to re-engine the second prototype with four Pratt & Whitney JT12 turbojets in 1959. The outer engines were mounted beside the inner ones, an arrangement that was later used on the Vickers VC10 and Ilyushin Il-62 airliners. The slipper tanks were removed and placed on the first prototype. The JT12 arrangement proved to be viable and was selected for the production versions, the first of which flew in mid 1960. One year later, the type entered commercial service.

The enactment of noise regulations in the United States and the aircraft's relatively high fuel consumption led to the development of the 731 JetStar, a modification program which installed newer Garrett TFE731 turbofan engines along with several other changes, including redesigned enlarged external fuel tanks that sit with their upper surfaces flush with the wing, rather than being centered on it, and the cockpit area being reworked with a somewhat more "modern" looking nose and window arrangement. The 731 JetStar modification program was so successful that Lockheed produced 40 new JetStars, designated the JetStar II, between 1976 and 1979. The JetStar IIs were factory-new aircraft with the turbofan engines and revised external fuel tanks. Both 731 JetStars and JetStar IIs have greatly increased range, reduced noise, and better runway performance compared to the original JetStars.

JetStar production totaled 204 aircraft, the final delivery took place in 1978. Most original JetStars have been retired, but numerous 731 JetStars and JetStar IIs are remain airworthy and in use across various roles, mainly as corporate and private jets.

== Design ==
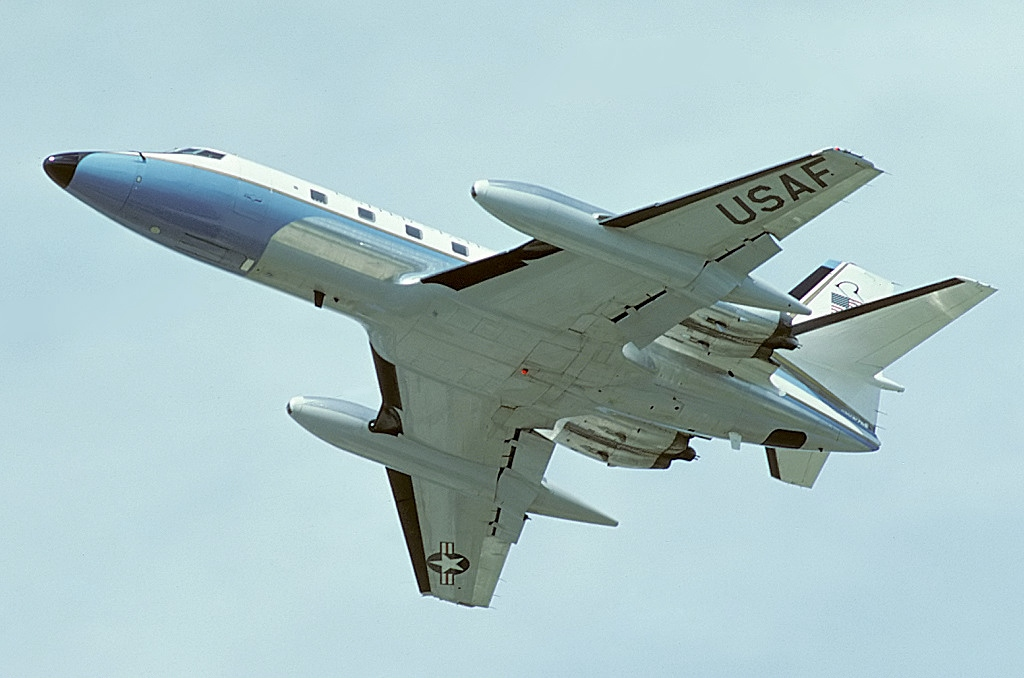
USAF VC-140B from below, showing its wing sweep and slipper tanks

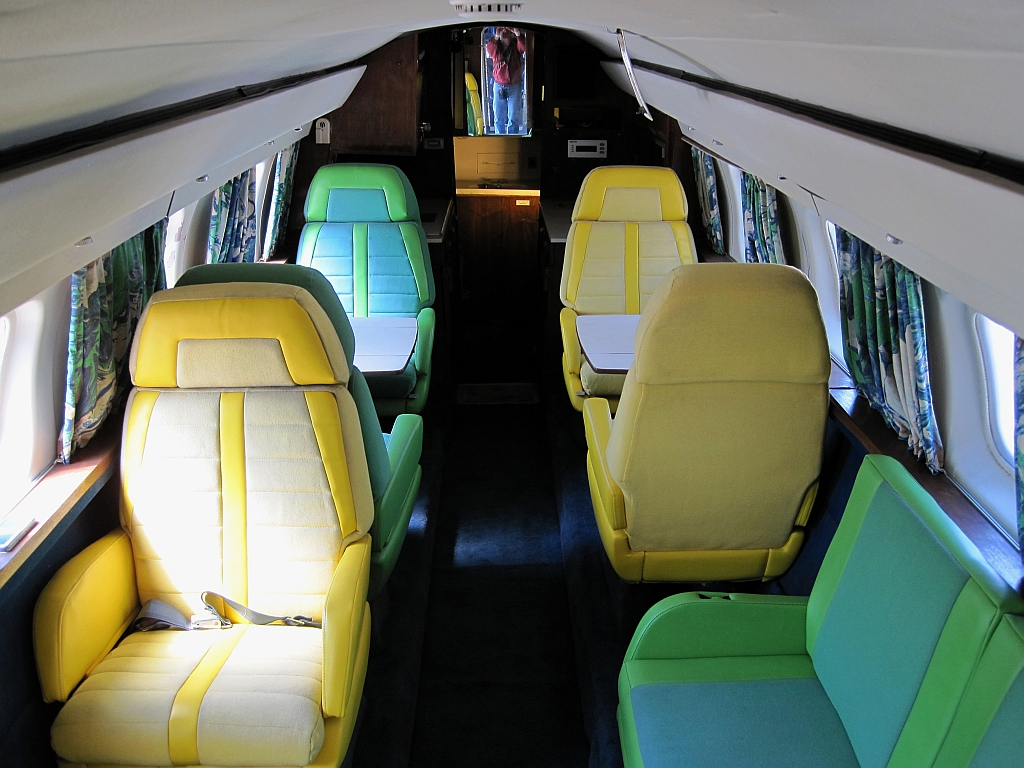
Elvis Presley's JetStar cabin, showing the aircraft's characteristic sunken aisle

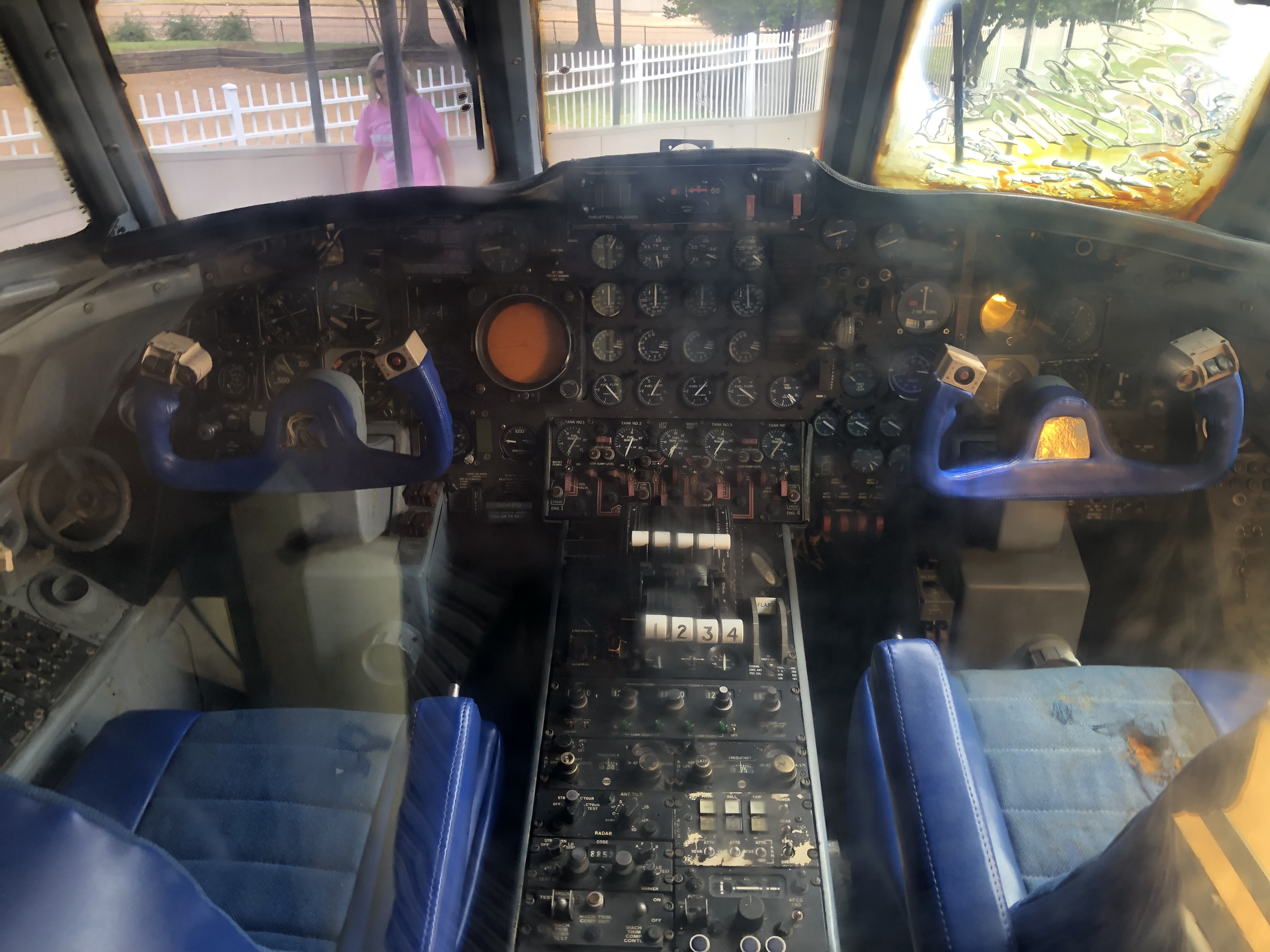
Cockpit of a Lockheed L-1329 Jetstar

The JetStar has a fairly typical business jet design layout, with a swept wing and a cruciform tail. The wing has a 30° sweepback and features large fuel tanks at about half-span, extending some distance in front and behind the wing. The wings hold 10,000 pounds (4,500 kg) of fuel, and each slipper tank holds 4,000 pounds (1,800 kg) of fuel for a total fuel load of 18,000 pounds (8,200 kg). The wing also includes leading edge flaps (not slats) along the front of the wing outboard of the tanks (these leading edge flaps reduce the stalling speed by an additional three knots), while double-slotted trailing edge flaps span the entire rear surface inboard of the ailerons. The wing incorporates inflatable rubber deicing boots for the removal of ice accumulated in flight. The original prototypes were fitted with a tricycle landing gear arrangement with one wheel on each leg, following an accident in 1962, the nose gear was modified with two tires.

To lower pilot workload, all of the JetStar's flight controls are power augmented. Lateral control was achieved via the ailerons without the use of spoilers. The horizontal stabilizer is mounted nearly halfway up the fin to keep it clear of the engines' jet blast. One feature is that the horizontal stabilizer is trimmable by pivoting the entire tail fin and stabilizer assembly, which has a distinctive unpainted area at the base of the fin. The JetStar does not have any tail deicing capability, nor was it required for certification. An air brake is located on the underside of the fuselage to aid deceleration for landing.

The JetStar is a relatively heavy aircraft for its class, at 44,500 pounds (20,200 kg). Maximum cruising speed is Mach 0.8, or 567 miles per hour (912 km/h) at 21,000 feet (6,400 m). Range is typically quoted as 2,500 miles (4,000 km) with a 3,500-pound (1,600 kg) payload. A typical interior feature seating for up to eight passengers along with a full-sized lavatory, or a slightly denser arrangement that could accommodate up to ten. The JetStar is one of the few aircraft of its class that permits a person to walk upright in the cabin, although to facilitate this, the aisle is sunk slightly so that the seats are raised on either side. The windows are relatively large.

== Operational history ==
Following the completion of flight testing, the first prototype was retained by Lockheed and used as the company's executive jet until 1982, at which point it was donated to the Pacific Vocational Institute in Vancouver, British Columbia and used for aircraft maintenance training.

A key early customer for the type was the USAF; during development, Lockheed had submitted the JetStar in response to a USAF competition for a compact four-engined utility aircraft and personnel transport, for which it was selected as the winner and assigned the service designation of C-140. Several models were adopted by the service; five C-140As were procured as flight inspection aircraft for the Air Force Communications Service and were used to perform airborne testing of airport navigational aids (navaids) from 1962 onwards. They entered service amid the Vietnam War and remained in active use until the early 1990s. The "Flight Check" C-140As were combat-coded aircraft that could be distinguished from the VIP transport version by their distinctive paint scheme. The C-140As were deployed to southeast Asia during the Vietnam War, where, in addition to their more usual navaid testing, they would loiter off the coast and act as communications relays between the Pentagon and the battlefield. The last C-140A to be retired was placed on static display at Scott AFB, Illinois.

The USAF also introduced an additional eleven JetStars, designated C-140B, although the first of these actually predated the C-140As when it was delivered in late 1961. The C-140Bs were used to transport personnel by the Military Airlift Command. Six of the aircraft (tail numbers 61–2488, 61–2489, 61–2490, 61–2491, 61-2492 and 61–2493) were fitted with more luxurious interiors and operated as VIP transports by the 89th Military Airlift Wing at Andrews Air Force Base, being designated as VC-140Bs. While the type was never allocated as the primary presidential aircraft, several US presidents, including Richard Nixon, Gerald Ford, Jimmy Carter, and Ronald Reagan, made frequent use of VC-140Bs across the 1970s and 1980s, being occasionally designated as Air Force One during such flights. During the presidency of Jimmy Carter, he used a dedicated VC-140B extensively for short trips and it was known within the Special Air Missions Wing as "Peanut One."

One of the first civil organizations in the world to operate an executive jet was Department of Transport, which operated a total of three between 1962 and 1986. The organisation used these for airway inspection and personnel transport, the latter included flights carrying the Prime Minister of Canada as well as numerous domestic and foreign officials. A total of eight JetStars were active in Canada.

Numerous celebrities and public figures flown on, or even owned, JetStars. Elvis Presley owned two JetStars at different times; the second was named Hound Dog II and is on display at Graceland. Several other celebrities, such as Bob Hope and Frank Sinatra also owned one. After Richard Nixon left office, he purchased a JetStar for personal use. Nixon's JetStar was subsequently sold to the Shah of Iran and later to Puerto Rican boy band Menudo. Several heads of state, heads of government, and other VIPs are known to have made use of JetStars.

The last operational JetStar (N313JS) was retired in December 2019, and is now preserved at the Aviation History & Technology Center in Marietta, GA. However, in November 2020, a Jetstar II (N700RM) was flown from Texas to Oregon. In December 2020, another Jetstar II (N710RM) was also ferried from Texas to Oregon.

== Variants ==
JetStar I
Business, executive transport aircraft, with accommodation for a crew of two and ten passengers, powered by four 3,300 pounds-force (15 kN) thrust Pratt & Whitney JT12A-8 turbojet engines.
JetStar II
New production version, powered by four 3,700 pounds-force (16 kN) thrust Garrett TFE731-3 turbofan engines, and fitted with revised external fuel tanks, 40 built.
JetStar 731
Modified version, fitted with four Garrett TFE731-1 turbofan engines, and equipped with redesigned external fuel tanks.
C-140A
Flight inspection aircraft for the US Air Force, similar to the JetStar I, five built.
C-140B
Passenger, cargo transport aircraft for the US Air Force, similar to the C-140A, five built.
VC-140B
VIP transport aircraft for the US Air Force, similar to the C-140B, six built.
C-140C
Two JetStar 6s were ordered by the United States Navy, originally designated UV-1, but not delivered.
T-40
US military designation for a proposed trainer version of the C-140 for evaluation, not built.
AAI FanStar
Conversion by American Aviation Industries with two General Electric CF34 engines in place of the four JT12 turbojets or TFE731 turbofans which first flew on 5 September 1986. Only one aircraft was converted. The work on the interior of the demonstrator was the subject of litigation in federal court in the late 1980s and early 1990s.

== Operators ==
=== Civil operators ===
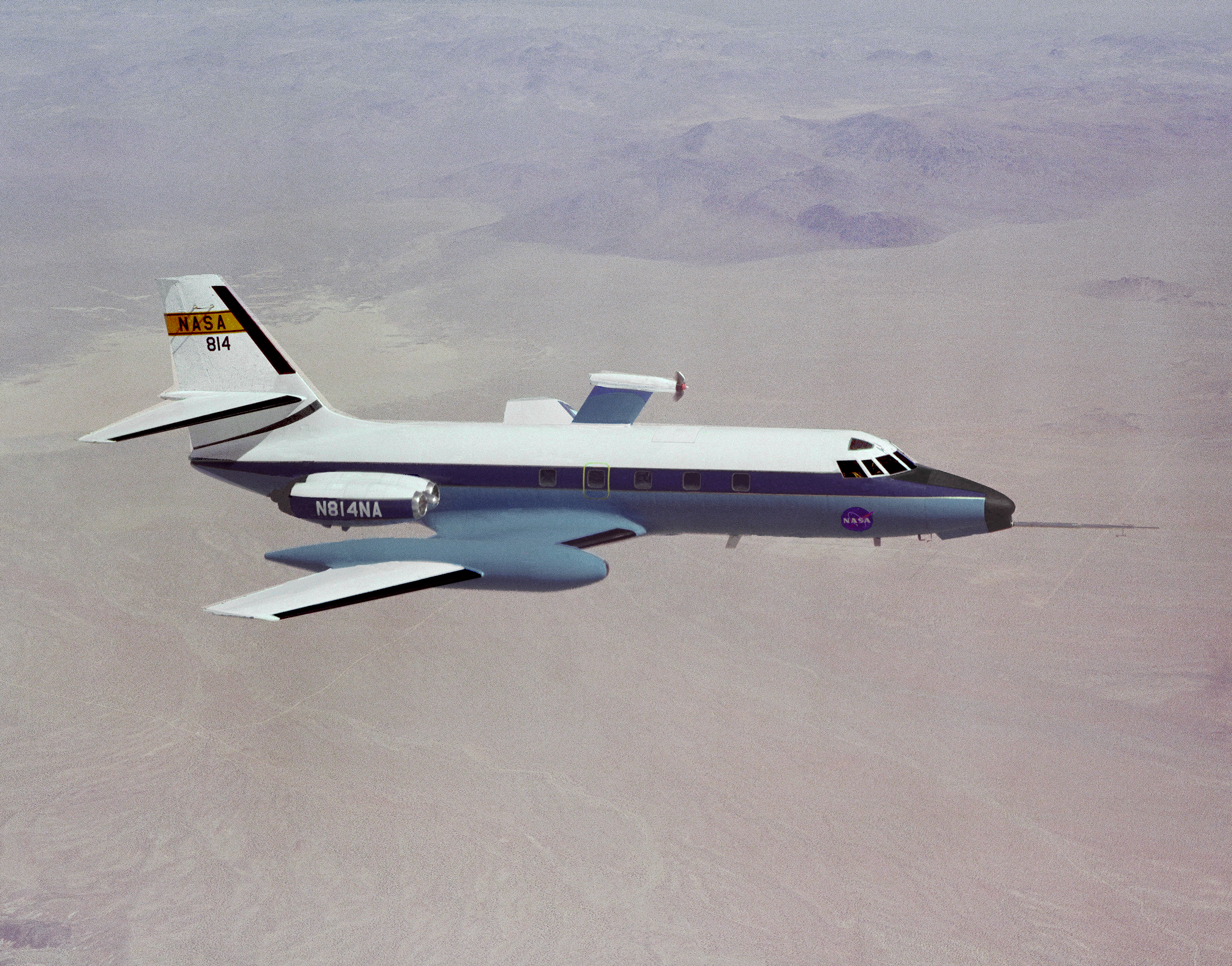
The NASA Dryden C-140 testing propfan designs in 1981

Algeria

- Air Algérie

Iraq

- Iraqi Airways

Mexico

- TAESA

Puerto Rico

- Menudo

United States

- Eastern Airlines
- Great Northern Railway registration N968GN, re-registered as N968BN and N7954S.
- Elvis Presley (this JetStar, known as "Hound Dog II", is currently on static display in Graceland in Memphis, TN)
- Southern Air Transport.
- Trans World Airlines (TWA).

=== Military and government operators ===
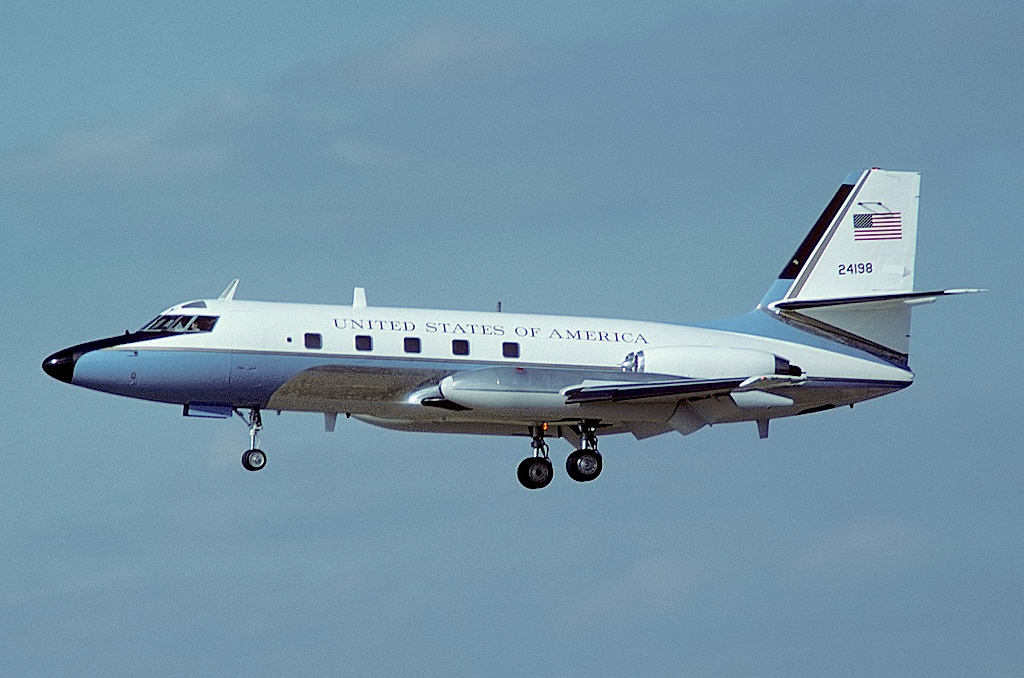
A US Air Force VC-140B

Canada

- Transport Canada - operated three

West Germany

- German Air Force former operator

Indonesia

- Indonesian Air Force former operator

Iran

- Islamic Republic of Iran Air Force

Iraq

- Iraqi Government

Kuwait

- Kuwait Government
  Lithuanian Airlines Lockheed L-1329 JetStar 731 LY-AMB

Libya

- Libyan Arab Air Force
- Libyan Government

Lithuania

- Lithuanian government (operated by Lithuanian Airlines) in early 1992-1998

Mexico

- Mexican Air Force

Saudi Arabia

- Royal Saudi Air Force

United States

- Federal Aviation Administration (FAA)
- National Aeronautics and Space Administration (NASA)
- United States Air Force (USAF)

== Accidents and incidents ==
- On 25 March 1976, a Jetstar taking off from Chicago Midway Airport overran runway 13R and crashed killing all four occupants on board.
- On 29 March 1981, a JetStar inbound from Nigeria overran runway 08 at London Luton Airport. The co-pilot suffered severe spinal injuries but the commanding pilot and seven passengers escaped with only minor injuries.
- On 5 January 1995, an Islamic Republic of Iran Air Force (IRIAF) JetStar crashed during an emergency landing, killing all 12 on board including General Mansour Sattari, commander of the IRIAF.

== Aircraft on display ==
Canada

- C-FDTX (c/n 5018) L-1329 Jetstar 6 – The Canada Aviation and Space Museum in Ottawa, has an L-1329 Jetstar 6 that the Department of Transport used to carry government officials and foreign dignitaries.
- C-FDTF (c/n 5088) L-1329 Jetstar 6 – The Atlantic Canada Aviation Museum has a Jetstar that was used by the Canadian Prime Minister and other government officials.

Indonesia

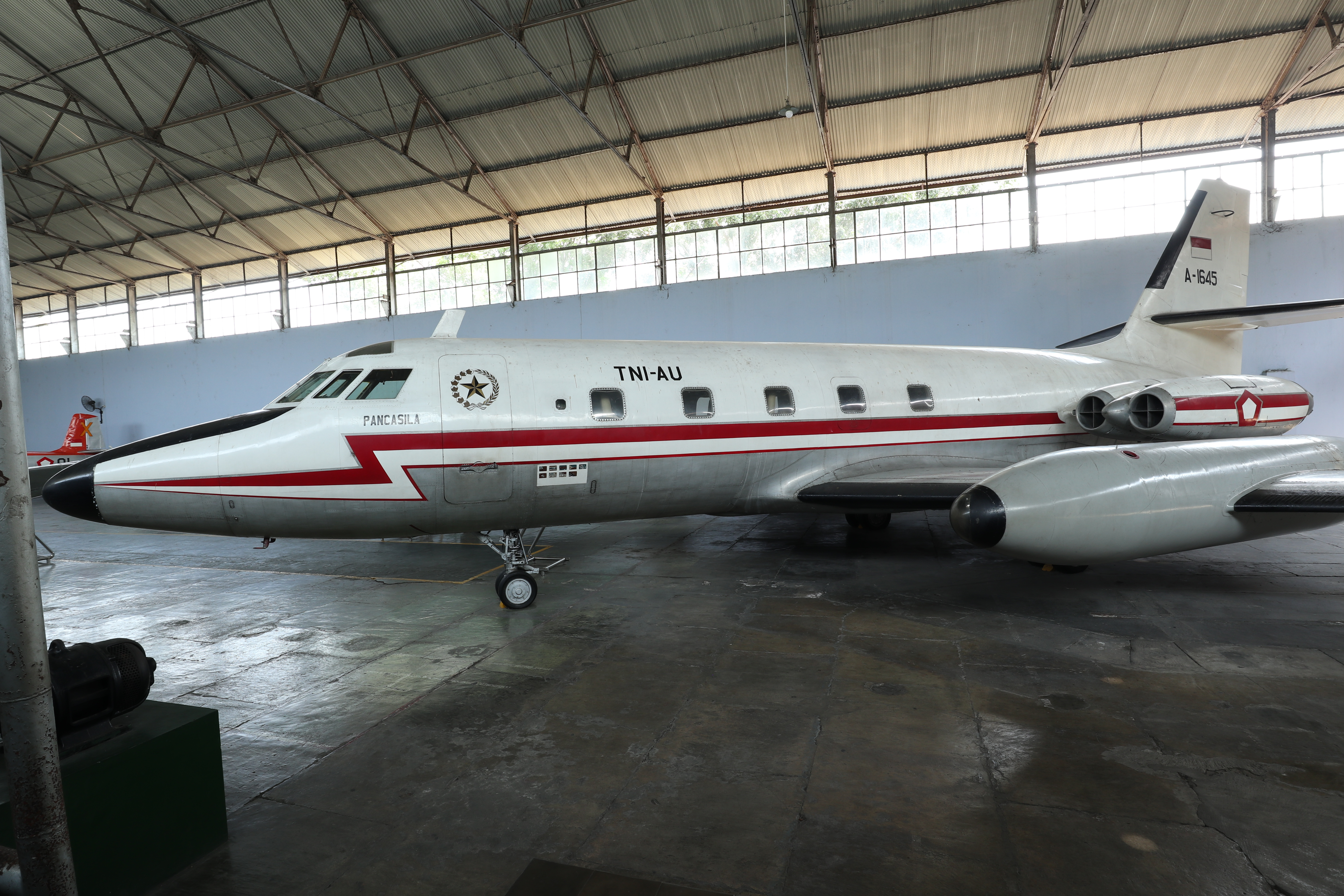
Indonesian Air Force Lockheed JetStar in Dirgantara Mandala Museum

- A-9446 (c/n 5046) L-1329 Jetstar 6 – Used as VIP aircraft of the Indonesian government, nicknamed "Sapta Marga". On display at Garuda Indonesia Training Centre (GITC) in Duri Kosambi, Cengkareng
- A-1645 (c/n 5059) L-1329 Jetstar 6 – Used as VIP aircraft of the Indonesian government, nicknamed "Pancasila". On display at Dirgantara Mandala Museum in Yogyakarta. This aircraft was used by Indonesia's first president, Sukarno.

Mexico

- 3908 (c/n 5144) L-1329 Jetstar 8 - On display at the Museo Militar de Aviación at Santa Lucía Air Force Base.

United Kingdom

- N25AG (c/n 5202) L-1329-25 JetStar II - fuselage preserved for guest accommodations at Apple Camping in Redberth, Pembrokeshire, Wales^{.[41]}

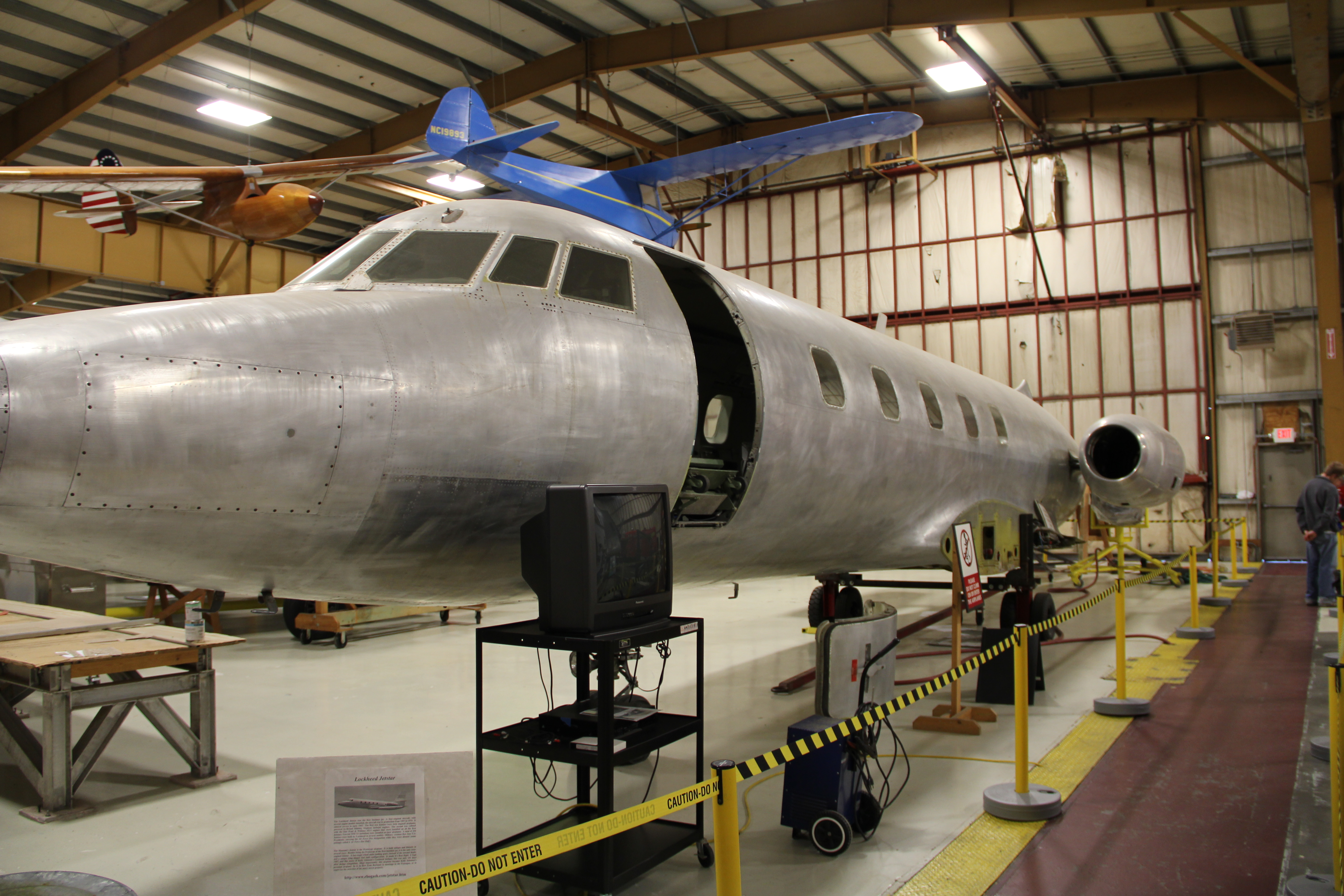
The first JetStar transported Kelly Johnson, displayed at the Museum of Flight near Seattle

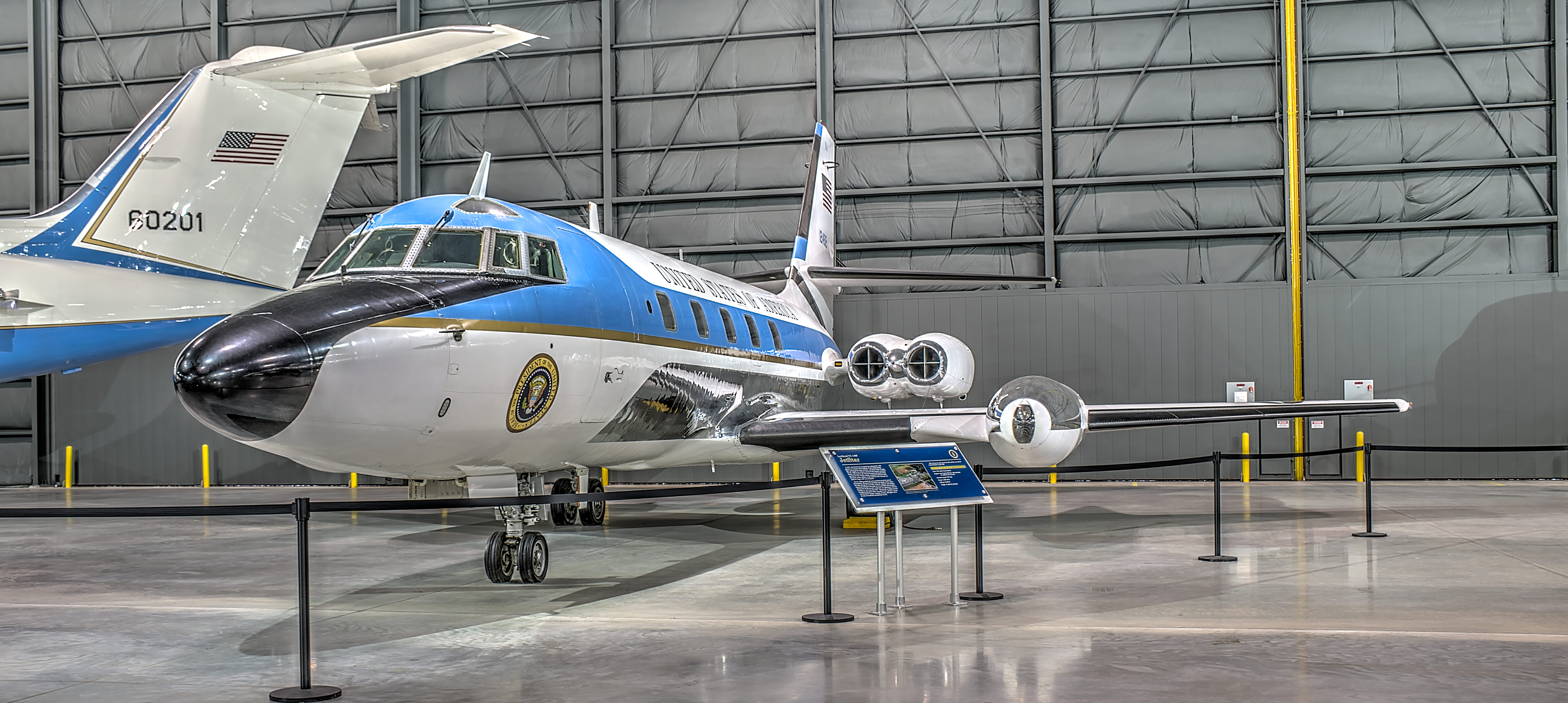
VC-140B at the USAF Museum

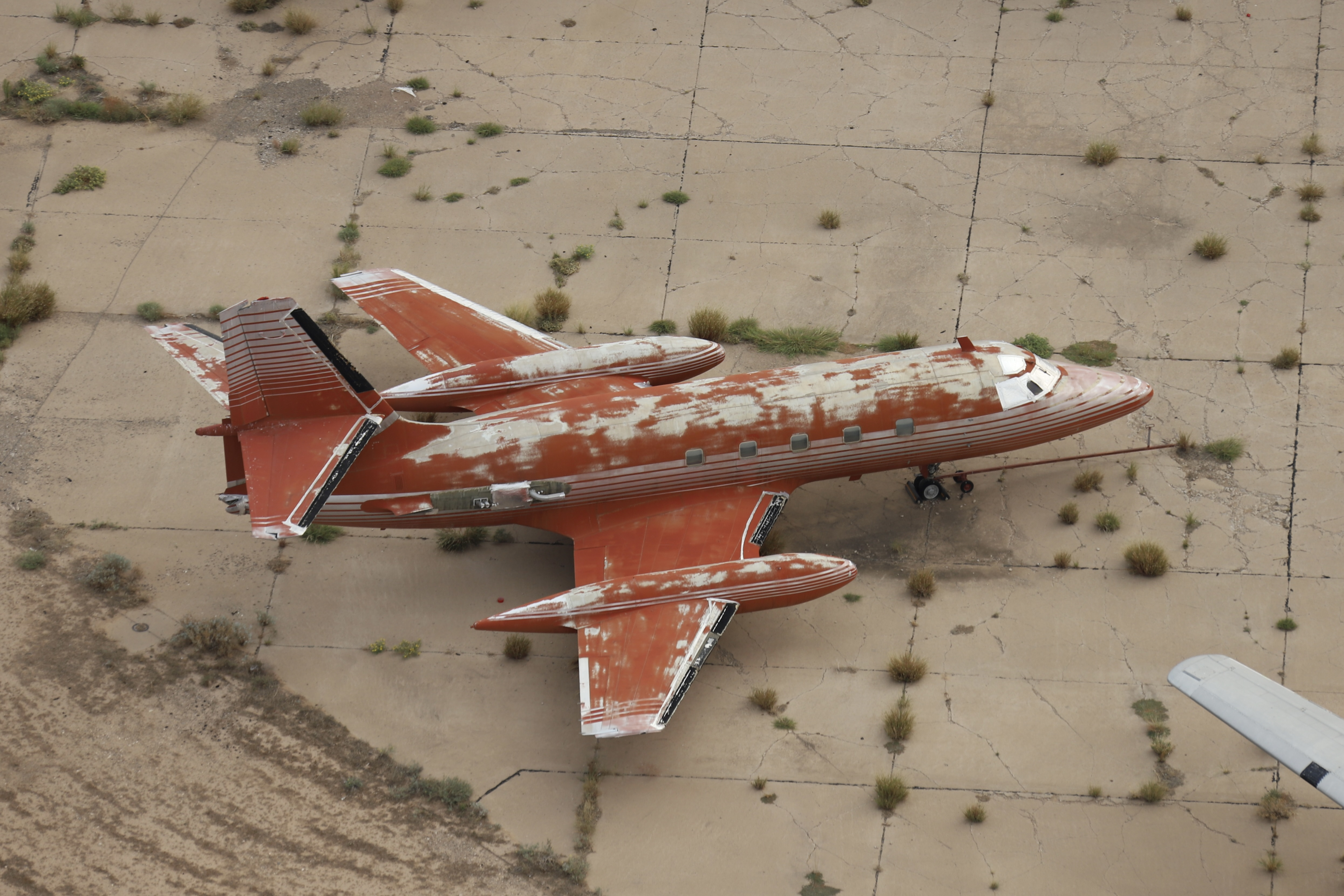
A 1962 Jetstar previously owned by Elvis Presley sat parked in Roswell, NM for decades

United States

- N329J (c/n 1001) L-1329 JetStar – The prototype JetStar is undergoing restoration at the Museum of Flight's Restoration Center in Everett, Washington. This aircraft is one of only two JetStars with only two engines.
- N711Z (c/n 1002) L-1329 JetStar - On pylon display in false USAF marking as 89-001 near Base Operations and the AMC Air Terminal at Andrews AFB, Maryland.
- N814NA (c/n 5003) L-1329 JetStar 6 - Former NASA JetStar is on display at the Joe Davies Heritage Park, Palmdale, California.

Elvis Presley's JetStar, and named Hound Dog II

- N777EP (c/n 5004) L-1329 JetStar 6 - Owned by Elvis Presley in his later years and named Hound Dog II, on display at Graceland, Memphis Tennessee. This is one of two Jetstars owned by Elvis Presley and/or his family.
- 59-5958 (c/n 5010) C-140A - Displayed at the Travis Air Force Base Heritage Center in Fairfield, California.
- 61-2488 (c/n 5017) VC-140B – The Museum of Aviation next to Robins Air Force Base has a VC-140B on display.
- 61-2489 (c/n 5022) VC-140B – Pima Air and Space Museum, adjacent to Davis-Monthan AFB in Tucson, Arizona.
- 61-2490 (c/n 5024) VC-140B - President Lyndon Johnson's JetStar is on display at the Lyndon B. Johnson National Historical Park.
- 59-5959 (c/n 5026) C-140A - In the Scott Field Heritage Air Park at Scott AFB, Illinois.
- 61-2492 (c/n 5031) VC-140B - In the Presidential Aircraft collection of the National Museum of the United States Air Force, Wright-Patterson AFB, Ohio.
- 59-5962 (c/n 5032) C-140A - Preserved at Edwards Air Force Base in Edwards, California.
- 62-4197 (c/n 5041) C-140B - Pima Air and Space Museum, adjacent to Davis-Monthan AFB in Tucson, Arizona. Aircraft has been given an artistic paintjob, named "Spy Tiger" by artist Andrew Schoultz.
- 62-4200 (c/n 5044) C-140B - Pima Air and Space Museum, adjacent to Davis-Monthan AFB in Tucson, Arizona. Aircraft has been given an artistic paintjob, named "Back to Supersonica" by artist Kenny Scharf.
- 62-4201 (c/n 5045) C-140B - Hill Aerospace Museum, Hill Air Force Base, Ogden, Utah, this was confirmed by former members of the 89th SAM from Andrews Air Force Base to have carried President Johnson and his wife.
- N428DA (c/n 5058) L-1329 JetStar 8 - On display at the Aviation History and Technology Center adjacent to Dobbins Air Reserve Base in Marietta, Georgia.
- N313JS (c/n 5086) L-1329 JetStar 731 - Preserved for display at the Aviation History and Technology Center adjacent to Dobbins Air Reserve Base in Marietta, Georgia.
- N33SJ (c/n 5087) L-1329 JetStar 731 - Forward fuselage preserved at the Planes of Fame Museum in Chino, California. Painted in false United States Air Force colors.
- N511TD (c/n 5145) L-1329 JetStar 8 - On display at the Greater Saint Louis Air & Space Museum, Cahokia, Illinois.
- XB-DUH (c/n 5157) L-1329 JetStar 8 - At the entrance to Dodson International Parts in Rantoul, Kansas with false registration N001DI.
- N175MD (c/n 5215) L-1329-25 JetStar II – The Miami Auto Museum in North Miami, Florida has a complete JetStar on display inside the museum.
- N377SA (c/n 5229) L-1329-25 JetStar II - On display at the Pacific Coast Air Museum in Santa Rosa, California.
- N77C (c/n 5232) L-1329-25 JetStar II - On display at the TWA Museum at Charles B. Wheeler Downtown Airport, Kansas City, Missouri.

== Specifications (JetStar II) ==
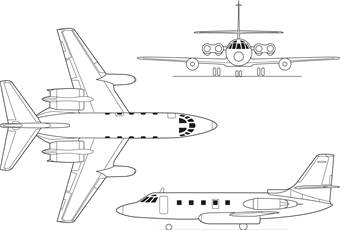
340

Data from Lockheed Aircraft since 1913

General characteristics

- Crew: two pilots and typically one flight attendant
- Capacity: 8–10 passengers
- Length: 60 ft 5 in (18.41 m)
- Wingspan: 54 ft 5 in (16.59 m)
- Height: 20 ft 5 in (6.22 m)
- Wing area: 542.5 sq ft (50.4 m^{2})
- Empty weight: 24,750 lb (11,226 kg)
- Gross weight: 41,535 lb (18,840 kg)
- Max takeoff weight: 44,500 lb (20,185 kg)
- Powerplant: 4 × Garrett TFE731-3 turbofan, 3,700 lbf (16 kN) thrust each

Performance

- Maximum speed: 547 mph (883 km/h, 476 kn) at 30,000 ft (9,145 m)
- Cruise speed: 504 mph (811 km/h, 438 kn)
- Range: 2,995 mi (4,820 km, 2,604 nmi)
- Service ceiling: 43,000 ft (13,105 m)
- Rate of climb: 4,150 ft/min (21.1 m/s)

== See also ==
Aircraft of comparable role, configuration, and era

- British Aerospace 125
- Gulfstream III
- Learjet 25
- McDonnell 119
- North American Sabreliner
