= McDonnell HRH =

XHRH

General information
- Type: Cargo helicopter
- National origin: United States
- Manufacturer: McDonnell Aircraft
- Status: Cancelled; mockup phase only
- Primary user: United States Marine Corps
- Number built: 0

The McDonnell HRH, company designation Model 78, was a 1950s transport helicopter proposal for the United States Marine Corps (USMC) by McDonnell Aircraft, designed to operate from Commencement Bay-class escort carriers.

== Development ==
McDonnell Aircraft was awarded a contract for the aircraft in March 1951 after responding to a 1950 USMC requirement for an assault transport helicopter to carry 30 fully-equipped marines and two pilots from an escort carrier. The HRH emerged as a compound helicopter with a three-bladed rotor driven by McDonnell-designed 1,600 lbf (7.1 kN) tip jets fed by auxiliary compressors driven by the main engines, which were also equipped with three-bladed propellers that would provide forward thrust once the stall speed of the aircraft's stub wings was exceeded. The aircraft would be equipped with a hydraulic loading ramp under the cockpit, and could alternately carry two smaller vehicles or 24 stretchers instead of 30 troops. The rotors, stub wings, and tail would fold to allow the large aircraft to use the small deck elevators on Commencement Bay-class escort carriers.

A full-scale mockup was inspected and approved by the U.S. Navy in October 1952 and construction of three prototypes (bureau numbers 133736 to 133738) was authorized; however, officials were concerned about potential developmental problems, and the end of the Korean War led to substantial US military budget cuts. Although the Bureau of Aeronautics had expected the XHRH-1 to fly in December 1955, the design was cancelled in 1953 in favor in of the Sikorsky HR2S, the first prototype remaining uncompleted. All work on the aircraft was terminated in April 1954.

== Specifications (Model 78 / XHRH-1 estimated) ==
Data from McDonnell Douglas aircraft since 1920. Volume II.

General characteristics

- Crew: 2
- Capacity: 30 troops or 24 stretchers or 2x Jeeps
- Length: 65 ft 11 in (20.09 m) 16.33 m (53.6 ft) folded
- Wingspan: 45 ft (14 m) foldable for carrier stowage
- Height: 16 ft 8 in (5.09 m)
- Wing area: 332 sq ft (30.8 m^{2})
- Empty weight: 19,169 lb (8,695 kg)
- Gross weight: 30,412 lb (13,795 kg)
- Max takeoff weight: 36,000 lb (16,329 kg)
- Powerplant: 2 × Allison XT56-A-4 turboprop / gas generators, 3,507 shp (2,615 kW) each
- Powerplant: 3 × McDonnell 12JP20 cold pressure jets, 1,600 lbf (7.1 kN) thrust each
- Main rotor diameter: 65 ft (20 m)
- Main rotor area: 3,320 sq ft (308 m^{2}) 3-bladed with tip-jets
- Propellers: 3-bladed constant speed fully-feathering propellers

Performance

- Maximum speed: 276 mph (444 km/h, 240 kn) at sea level
- Combat range: 116 mi (186 km, 100 nmi) out and return radius
- Service ceiling: 10,000 ft (3,000 m) hovering ceiling out of ground effect
- Rate of climb: 2,300 ft/min (12 m/s)
