= Ranger Engines =

Aircraft engine company, USA

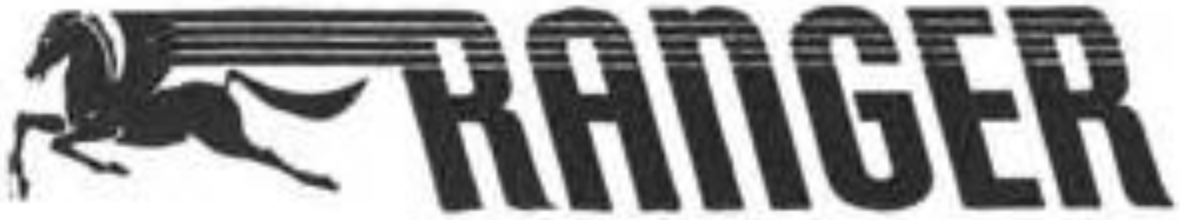
- Industry: Aerospace
- Founder: Harold Caminez
- Headquarters: Farmingdale, New York, United States

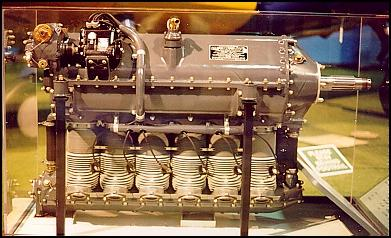
Fairchild L-440 air-cooled, six-cylinder, inverted, in-line engine used in Fairchild PT-19

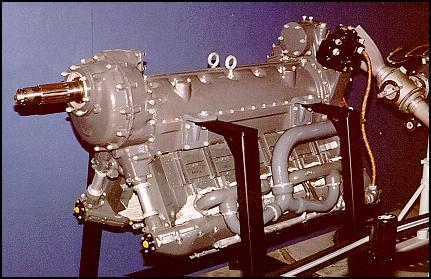
A preserved Ranger V-770

The Ranger Engines Division (also Ranger Aircraft Engine Division) of the Fairchild Engine & Aircraft Corporation was an American aircraft engine company. It was known as the Fairchild Engine Division after World War II.

== History ==
The Fairchild-Caminez Engine Corporation was founded in 1925 to produce Harold Caminez's 447 engine. In 1928, it constructed a factory in Farmingdale, New York. The American Airplane & Engine Corporation was founded by the Aviation Corporation in 1931 to continue manufacturing of Ranger engines.

In 1934, the company name changed to Ranger Engineering Corporation, then in 1939 to Ranger Aircraft Engines, Division of Fairchild Engine and Airplane Corporation.

== Products ==
Model name	Configuration	Power
Fairchild-Caminez Model 447	X4	120 hp
Fairchild 6-370A	I6	120 hp
Ranger 6-390B		120 hp
Ranger 6-410B		165 hp
Ranger L-440	I6	175 hp
Ranger V-770	V12	520 hp
XV-920		
XH-1850		1,500 hp
Fairchild J44	Turbojet	1,000 lbf
Fairchild J83	Turbojet	2,450 lbf

== See also ==
- List of aircraft engines
