= Bréguet 941 =

French STOL transport aircraft with 4 turboprop engines, 1959

Br 941
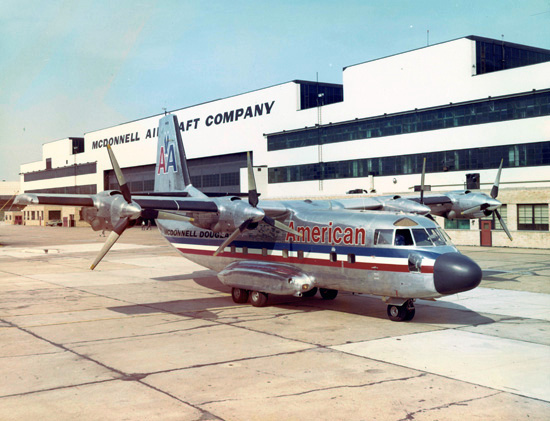
- 941S during McDonnell Douglas promotional tour

General information
- Type: STOL Transport
- Manufacturer: Breguet
- Primary user: French Air Force
- Number built: 1 (940) + 1 (941) + 4 (941S)

History
- Introduction date: 1967
- First flight: 21 May 1958 (Breguet 940); 1 June 1961 (Breguet 941)
- Retired: 1974

The Breguet 941 is a French four-engine turboprop short takeoff and landing (STOL) transport aircraft developed by Breguet in the 1960s. Although widely promoted, both by Breguet in France and by McDonnell Aircraft and McDonnell Douglas in the United States, it was not built in large numbers; only one prototype and four production aircraft were built.

== Design and development ==
In the late 1940s and early 1950s, the French aviation pioneer Louis Charles Breguet developed a concept for a short takeoff and landing (STOL) aircraft using four free-turbine turboshaft engines to drive a common powershaft, which, in turn drove four oversize propellers, which were evenly spaced along the leading edge of the wing with large, full-span, slotted flaps, with the arrangement known as "l'aile soufflée" or blown wing.

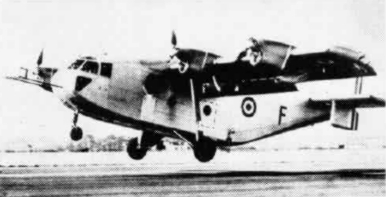
The Breguet 940 on take-off

An initial, experimental prototype, powered by four Turbomeca Turmo II engines, the Breguet 940 Integral, first flew on 21 May 1958, and was used to prove the concept, demonstrating excellent short field performance. This led to an order being placed in February 1960 for a prototype of an aircraft employing the same concept, but capable of carrying useful loads. This aircraft, the Breguet 941, first flew on 1 June 1961.

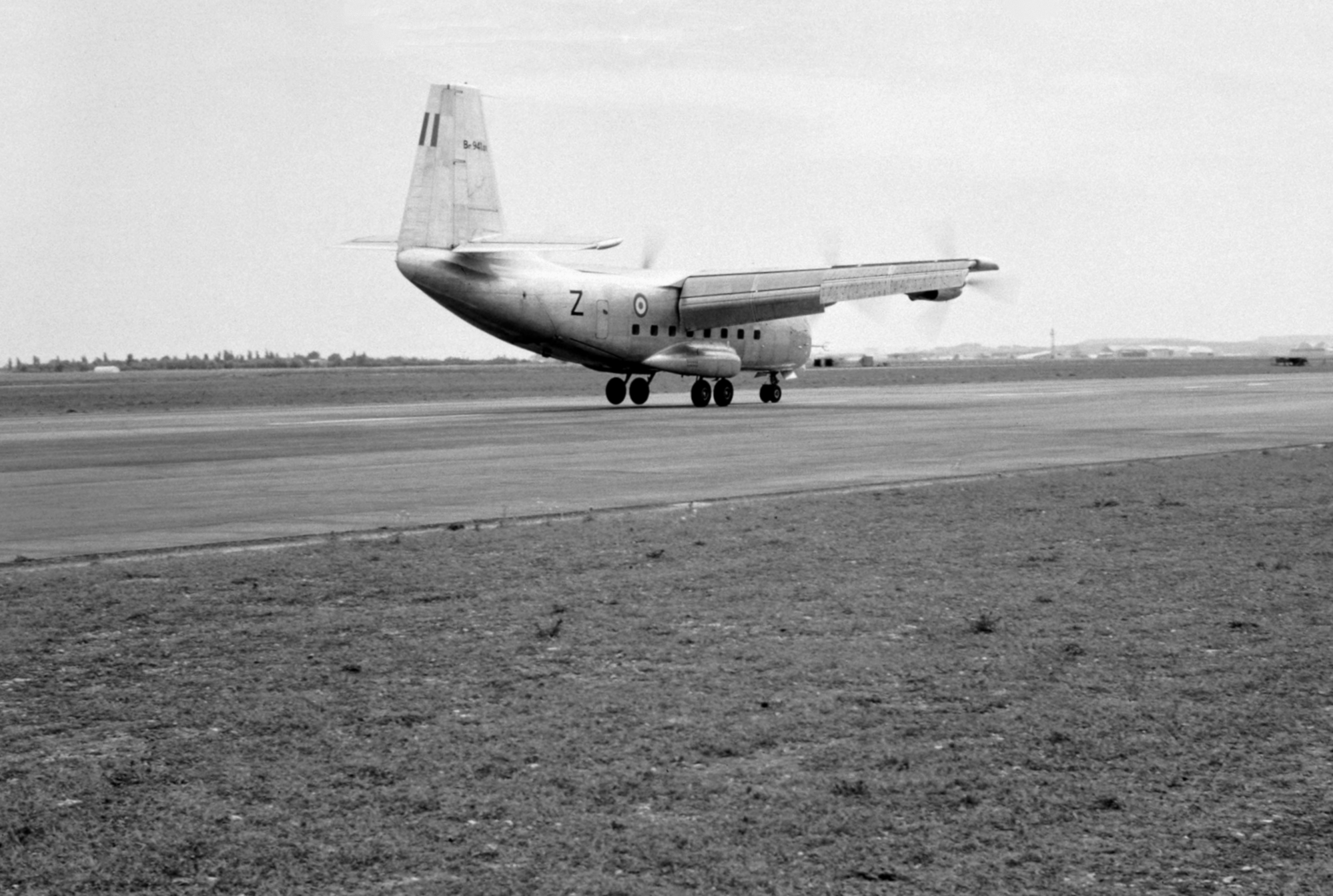
Breguet 941 prototype in 1963

Testing of this prototype resulted in an order for four improved production aircraft, the Breguet 941S for the French Air Force, first flying on 19 April 1967. These were fitted with more powerful engines and a modified rear cargo door to allow for air-dropping of stores.

=== Br 942 ===
Breguet intended to develop the 940 genre further by adding a pressurised fuselage with airline seating as the Breguet Br 942. Wings, landing gear, empennage and engines were essentially similar to the Br 941, but were to be mated to a new 3.1 m (10 ft 2.0 in) diameter circular section fuselage, with airline seating for 40 first/business class or up to 60 economy class passengers. After the limited success of the Br 941 and Br 941S and expected high running costs, further development was abandoned.

=== McDonnell Aircraft and McDonnell Douglas ===
McDonnell Aircraft acquired a production licence for the 941 in the United States and began marketing the aircraft with minimal changes as the McDonnell 188. The company also promoted an upgraded version with a circular-section pressurised fuselage, uprated engines, and other enhancements as the 188E. Marketing of the 188E continued after McDonnell merged with Douglas Aircraft to form McDonnell Douglas, and the merged company proposed to build an even larger and more powerful version as the McDonnell Douglas 210.

== Operational history ==
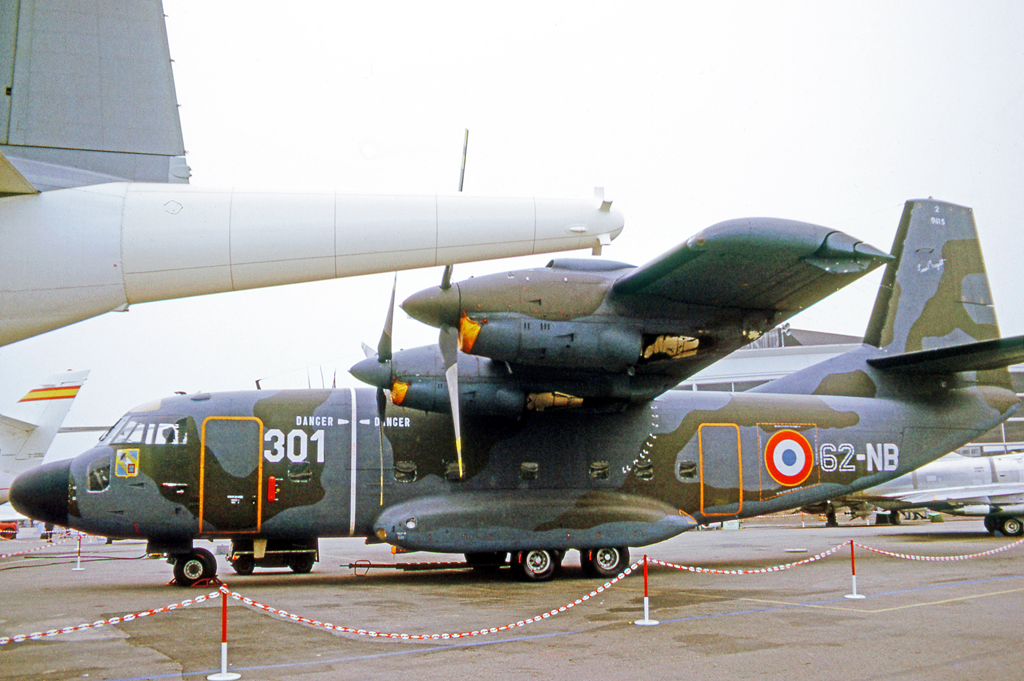
Breguet 941S No.2 of the French Air Force exhibited at the 1971 Paris Air Show at Paris Le Bourget Airport.

The 941 prototype was tested extensively in both France and the United States. McDonnell conducted demonstrations with the prototype in late 1964 and again in early 1965. The aircraft was evaluated by both NASA and the US military, but no orders were placed. McDonnell Douglas continued these efforts, using a production 941S for limited passenger operations for two months in 1968 with Eastern Air Lines between busy urban centers in the northeast U.S. The following year, this same aircraft was tested by American Airlines and then by the Federal Aviation Administration to evaluate the STOLport concept for operation from small city airports. Despite these tests, the company found that airlines were primarily interested in operating jets from conventional airports, and did not embrace the novel STOLport concept; no sales resulted and none of the proposed upgraded versions left the drawing boards.

The four Breguet 941S aircraft entered service with the French Air Force in 1967, serving until 1974.

== Variants ==
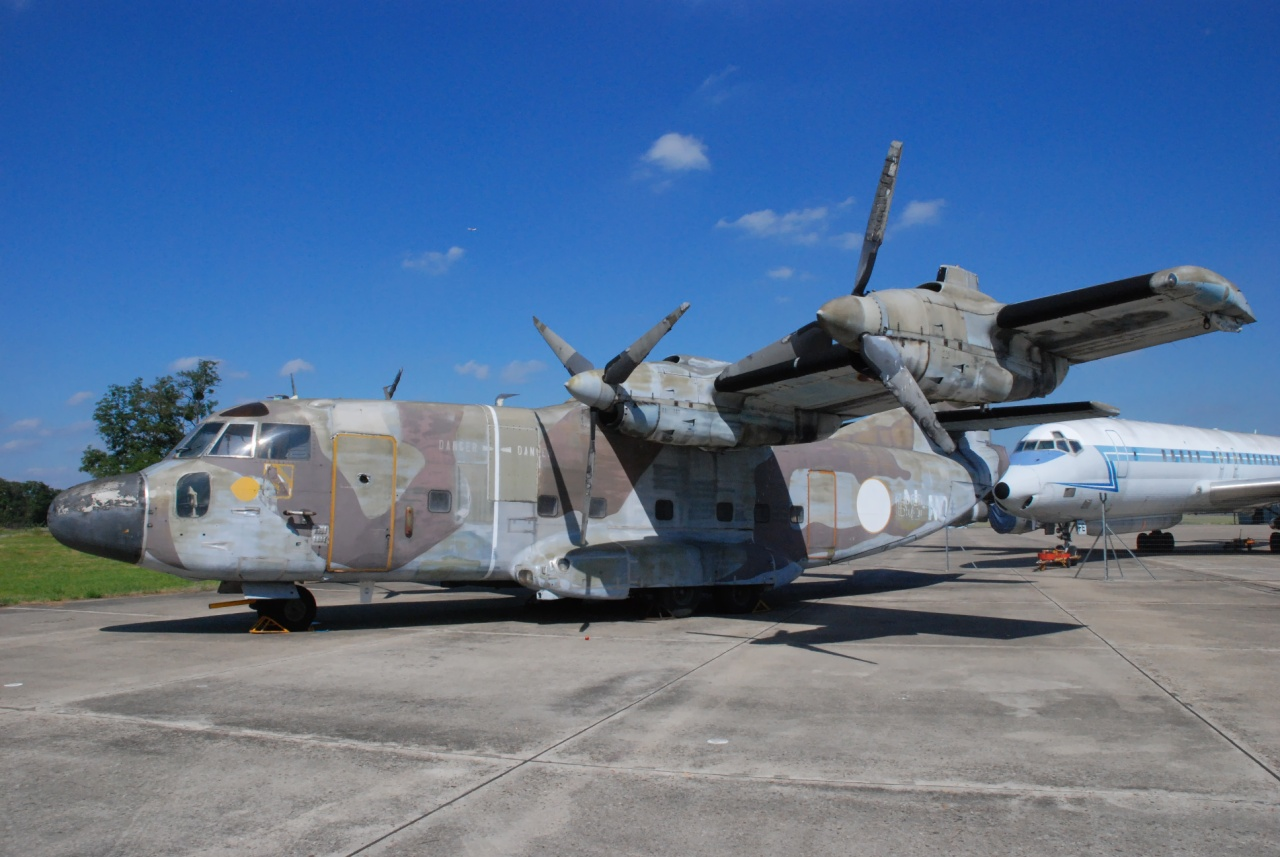
Breguet 941S preserved at the Musée de l'Air et de l'Espace

Breguet Br 940 Integral
Experimental prototype for concept demonstration, one built, powered by 4 298.3 kW (400 hp) Turbomeca Turmo II turboshaft engines.

Breguet Br 941
Prototype transport, one built, powered by 4 913.5 kW (1,225 hp) Turbomeca Turmo IIID turboshaft engines.

Breguet Br 941S
Production version for the French Air Force, an enlarged version of the 941, four built, powered by 4 1,081.3 kW (1,450 hp) Turbomeca Turmo IIID_{3} turboshaft engines.

Breguet Br 942
Proposed airliner development to have had a pressurised fuselage with airline seating for 40 first/business class or up to 60 economy class passengers.

Breguet 945
Studies for a smaller version of the Breguet 942, primarily for military use, for operation from 304.8 m (1,000 ft) length hot and high airstrips. Power was to be supplied by two 1,081.3 kW (1,450 hp) Turbomeca Turmo IIIDs and a payload of about 1,497 kg (3,300 lb) would be carried for more than 1,448.4 km (900 mi) at about 386.2 km/h (240 mph). Development of the 945 was not continued to production status.

McDonnell 188
Proposed licence manufacture of 941S in the United States by McDonnell Aircraft and later McDonnell Douglas; none built.

McDonnell Douglas 188E
Proposed airliner development with four 1,600 shp (1,200 kW) General Electric CT58-16 engines, pressurisation, up to 76 seats, and redesigned landing gear; not built.

McDonnell Douglas 210
Proposed airliner development with four 3,300 shp (2,500 kW) General Electric CT64-630-3 engines; two fuselages proposed, with either six-abreast seating for 90 passengers in a single-aisle 3-3 configuration (Model 210E), or 112 passengers in a double-aisle 2-2-2 configuration (210G); not built.

== Operators ==
France

- Armée de l'Air

== Surviving aircraft ==
- The third Breguet 941S [941S-03] coded 62-NC was previously on display at the Parc Avenue amusement park in Lanas, France. It is now at to the Ailes Anciennes Museum at Toulouse Blagnac Airport.
- The fourth Br 941S [941S-04] coded 62-ND is stored with the Musée de l'Air et de l'Espace at the Dugny storage site on the far side of Paris Le Bourget Airfield.

== Specifications (Br 941S) ==
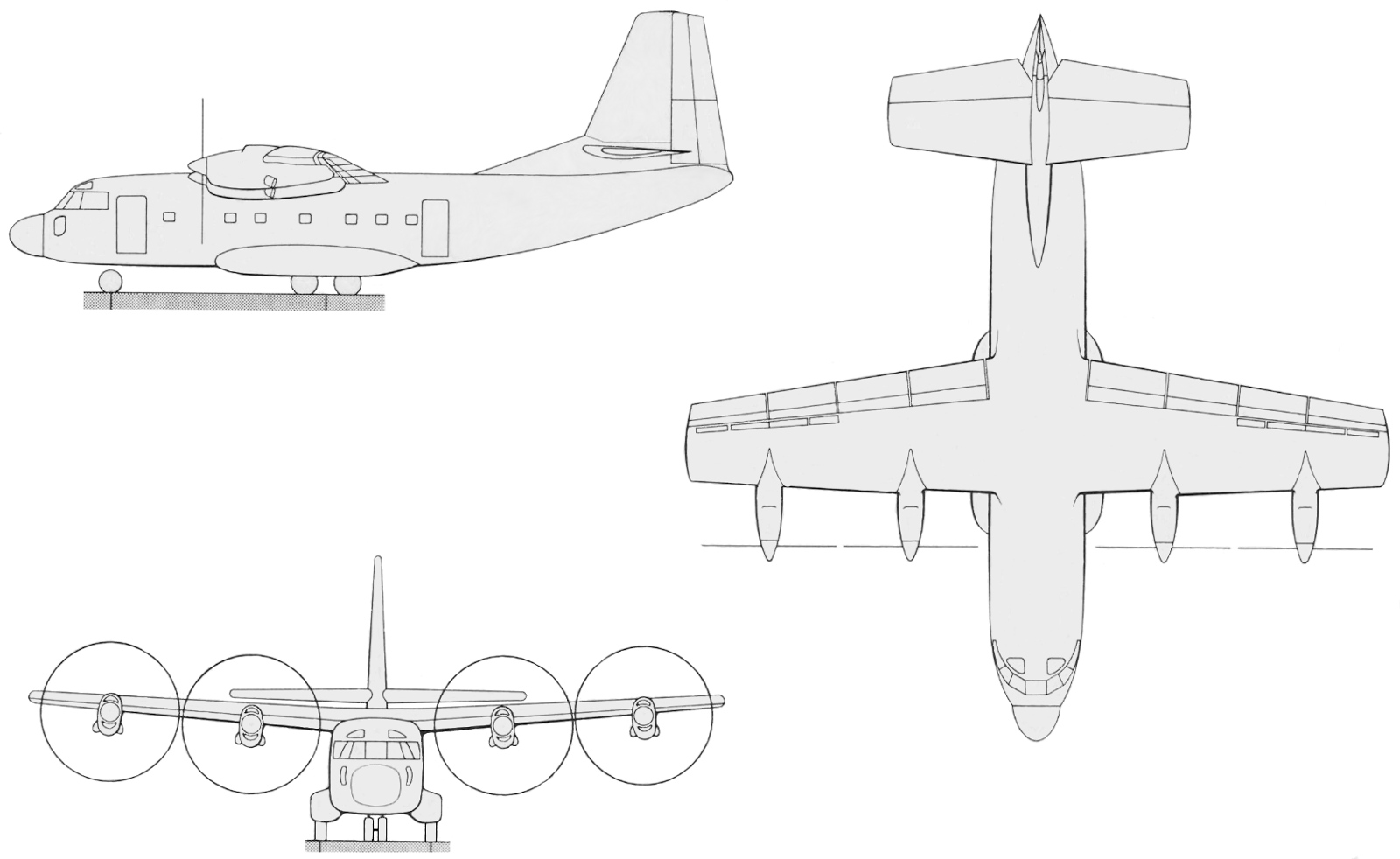
Breguet 941S drawing

Data from The Encyclopedia of World Aircraft

General characteristics

- Crew: 2
- Capacity: 57 civil passengers or 40 fully loaded troops or 24 stretchers
- Length: 23.75 m (77 ft 11 in)
- Wingspan: 23.4 m (76 ft 9 in)
- Height: 9.65 m (31 ft 8 in)
- Wing area: 83.8 m^{2} (902 sq ft)
- Airfoil: NACA 63A416
- Powerplant: 4 × Turbomeca Turmo IIID_{3} turboprop engines, 1,119 kW (1,501 hp) each all four engines linked by transmission shafts
- Propellers: 3-bladed constant-speed propellers

Performance

- Maximum speed: 450 km/h (280 mph, 240 kn)
- Cruise speed: 400 km/h (250 mph, 220 kn)
- Range: 1,000 km (620 mi, 540 nmi)
- Service ceiling: 9,500 m (31,200 ft)
- Take-off run: 185 m (607 ft) at 22,000 kg (48,502 lb)

== See also ==
Aircraft of comparable role, configuration, and era

- Antonov An-12
- de Havilland Canada Dash 7
- Lockheed C-130 Hercules

== Bibliography ==
- Chillon, Jacques; Dubois, Jean-Pierre & Wegg, John (1980). French Post-War Transport Aircraft. Tonbridge, UK: Air-Britain. ISBN 0-85130-078-2.
- Cuny, Jean & Leyvastre, Pierre (1977). Les Avions Breguet (1940/1971). DOCAVIA (in French). Vol. 6. Paris: Editions Larivière. OCLC 440863702.
- Francillon, René (1990). McDonnell Douglas Aircraft Since 1920. Vol. II. Annapolis, Maryland: Naval Institute Press. ISBN 1-55750-550-0.
- Lacaze, Henri (2016). Les avions Louis Breguet Paris [The Aircraft of Louis Breguet, Paris] (in French). Vol. 2: le règne du monoplan. Le Vigen, France. ISBN 978-2-914017-89-3.
