= Northrop AQM-35 =

Supersonic drone

Q-4 / AQM-35
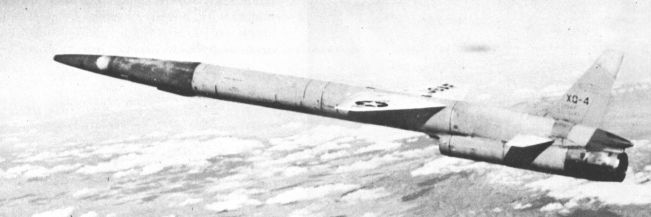
- XQ-4

General information
- Type: Target drone
- National origin: United States
- Manufacturer: Northrop Corporation
- Primary user: United States Air Force
- Number built: 25

History
- First flight: January 1956
- Retired: mid 1960s

The AQM-35 was a supersonic target drone produced by the Northrop Corporation.

== Overview ==
The AQM-35 program began life in 1953 as the Model RP-61 supersonic target drone. In June 1954 the United States Air Force awarded Northrop a contract for development of the project as the Q-4; the first flight-capable XQ-4 was launched in 1956.

The XQ-4 was capable of either ground or air launch, though the former mode was never tested. It was powered by a Westinghouse XJ81-WE-3 turbojet, allowing it to reach speeds of Mach 1.55. The drone's course was followed with radar, and flight commands were sent by a radio telemetry system. When the mission was completed the XQ-4 would deploy a three-stage parachute system along with four large inflatable airbags to cushion the impact with the ground.

The Air Force planned to use the Q-4 as a target for various surface-to-air and air-to-air missiles. A secondary reconnaissance function was planned, with TV or cameras carried. The drone was air-launched by a Lockheed DC-130 Hercules drone controller aircraft, or other carrier aircraft.

In 1963, the Q-4 family of drones were given the designation AQM-35A and AQM-35B. They were never considered entirely successful, with a variety of problems arising during both the development and flight testing phases. It was also considered that the flight performance of the drone was so high that it was not a realistic test for the missiles being developed––ironic since the whole point of the project was to develop a supersonic target. Only 25 of all types were ever built. The last examples of the type were retired during the 1960s.

== Variants ==

XQ-4
Prototype of the RP-61 supersonic target drone.
Q-4
Production target drones.
Q-4A
Developed to use a Fairchild J83 engine and a modified radar signature for testing the CIM-10 Bomarc missile. When the engine could not be developed in time the variant was cancelled.
Q-4B
Fitted with a much more powerful J85-GE-5 engine and a strengthened airframe. This variant was first flown in 1961.
AQM-35A
Post 1962 designation of the Q-4 drone.
AQM-35B
Post 1962 designation of the Q-4B

== Specifications (Q-4/AQM-35A) ==
General characteristics

- Length: 33 ft 0 in (10.06 m)

Q-4B/AQM-35B: 35.333 ft (10.77 m)

- Wingspan: 11 ft 1 in (3.38 m)

Q-4B/AQM-35B: 12.666 ft (3.86 m)

- Diameter: 1 ft 8 in (0.51 m)
- Height: 5 ft 7 in (1.69 m)

Q-4B/AQM-35B: 6.167 ft (1.88 m)

- Empty weight: 1,980 lb (898 kg)

Q-4B/AQM-35B: 3,400 lb (1,542 kg)

- Powerplant: 1 × Westinghouse XJ81-WE-3 Lightweight expendable turbojet, 1,810 lbf (8.1 kN) thrust

Q-4B/AQM-35B: 1x General Electric J85-GE-5 turbojet, 3,850 lbf (17 kN) thrust

Performance

- Service ceiling: 60,000 ft (18,000 m)

Q-4B/AQM-35B: 70,000 ft (21,336 m)

- Maximum speed: M1.55

Q-4B/AQM-35B: M2.0

== See also ==
- List of missiles
- Unmanned aerial vehicle
