= McDonnell Aircraft Corporation =

American aerospace company (1939–1967)

- Logo used until 1950s
- Industry: Aerospace
- Founded: July 6, 1939; 87 years ago
- Founder: James Smith McDonnell
- Defunct: April 28, 1967; 59 years ago
- Fate: Merged with Douglas Aircraft Company
- Successor: McDonnell Douglas
- Headquarters: St. Louis, Missouri, United States
- Key people: David S. Lewis; Sanford N. McDonnell

The McDonnell Aircraft Corporation was an American aerospace manufacturer that was based in St. Louis, Missouri. The company was founded on July 6, 1939, by James Smith McDonnell, and was best known for its military fighters, including the F-4 Phantom II, and crewed spacecraft including the Mercury capsule and Gemini capsule. McDonnell Aircraft later merged with the Douglas Aircraft Company to form McDonnell Douglas in 1967.

== History ==
James McDonnell founded J.S. McDonnell & Associates in Milwaukee, Wisconsin, in 1928 to produce a small aircraft for family use. The economic depression from 1929 ruined his plans and the company collapsed. He went to work for Glenn L. Martin.

He left in 1938 to try again with his own firm, McDonnell Aircraft Corporation, based at St. Louis, Missouri, in 1939. World War II was a major boost to the new company. It grew from 15 employees in 1939 to 5,000 at the end of the war and became a significant aircraft parts producer, and developed the XP-67 Bat fighter prototype. McDonnell also developed the LBD-1 Gargoyle guided missile. McDonnell Aircraft suffered after the war with an end of government orders and a surplus of aircraft, and heavily cut its workforce. The advent of the Korean War helped push McDonnell into a major military fighter supply role.

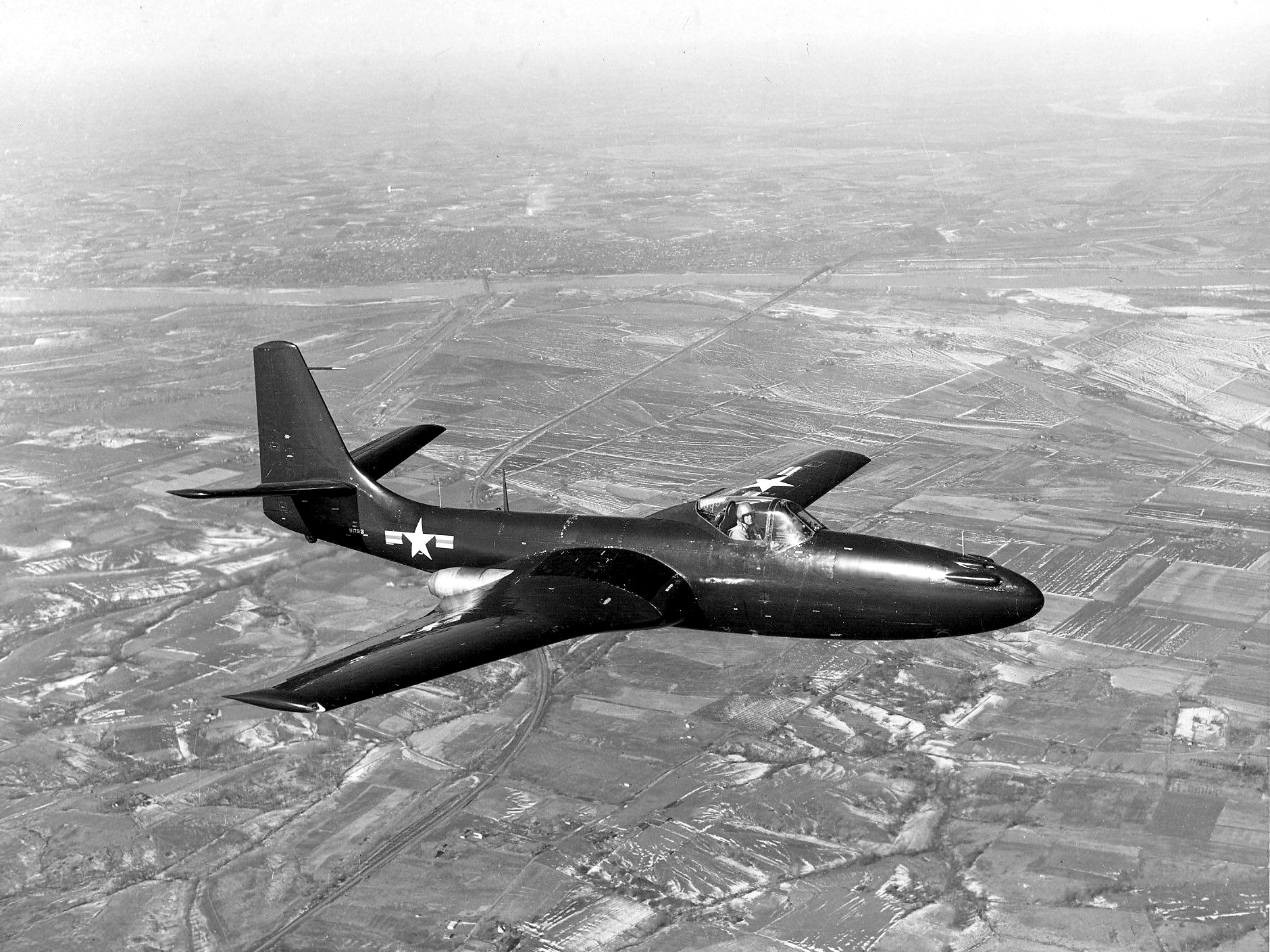
An FH-1 Phantom in 1948

In 1943, McDonnell began developing jets when they were invited to bid in a US Navy contest and eventually built the successful FH-1 Phantom in the postwar era. The Phantom introduced McDonnell's telltale design with engines placed forward under the fuselage and exiting just behind the wing, a layout that was used successfully on the F2H Banshee, F3H Demon, and the F-101 Voodoo. David S. Lewis joined the company as Chief of Aerodynamics in 1946. He led the development of the legendary F-4 Phantom II in 1954, which was introduced into service in 1960. Lewis became Executive Vice President in 1958, and finally became President and Chief Operating Officer in 1962.

McDonnell made a number of missiles, including the pioneering Gargoyle and unusual ADM-20 Quail, as well as experimenting with hypersonic flight, research that enabled them to gain a substantial share of the NASA projects Mercury and Gemini. The success of the Mercury capsule led the company adopted a new logo features the capsule circling a globe with the motto "First Free Man in Space". The company was now a major employer, but was having problems. It had almost no civilian business, and was thus vulnerable to any peacetime downturn in procurement.

Meanwhile, Douglas Aircraft was reeling from cash flow problems and development costs. It was also having a hard time meeting demand. The two companies began sounding each other out about a merger in 1963. On paper, they were a good match. Douglas' civilian business would have been more than enough to allow McDonnell to withstand any downturns in military procurement, while the cash flow from McDonnell's military contracts would have given Douglas badly needed security. Douglas formally accepted McDonnell's offer in December 1966, and the two firms officially merged on April 28, 1967, as the McDonnell Douglas Corporation (MDC). Soon after the merger was announced, McDonnell bought 1.5 million shares of Douglas stock to help Douglas meet "immediate financial requirements". McDonnell management dominated the merged company. It was based at McDonnell's facility in St. Louis, with James McDonnell as chairman and CEO. In 1967, with the merger of McDonnell and Douglas Aircraft, David Lewis, then president of McDonnell, was named chairman of what was called the Douglas Aircraft Division. After managing the turnaround of the division, he returned to St. Louis in 1969 as president of McDonnell Douglas.

McDonnell Douglas later merged with Boeing in August 1997. Boeing's defense and space division includes the part purchased from Rockwell (ROK) in 1986 and is based at the former McDonnell facility in St. Louis, and is responsible for defense and space products and services. McDonnell Douglas' legacy product programs include the F-15 Eagle, AV-8B Harrier II, F/A-18 Hornet, and F/A-18E/F Super Hornet.

== Products ==
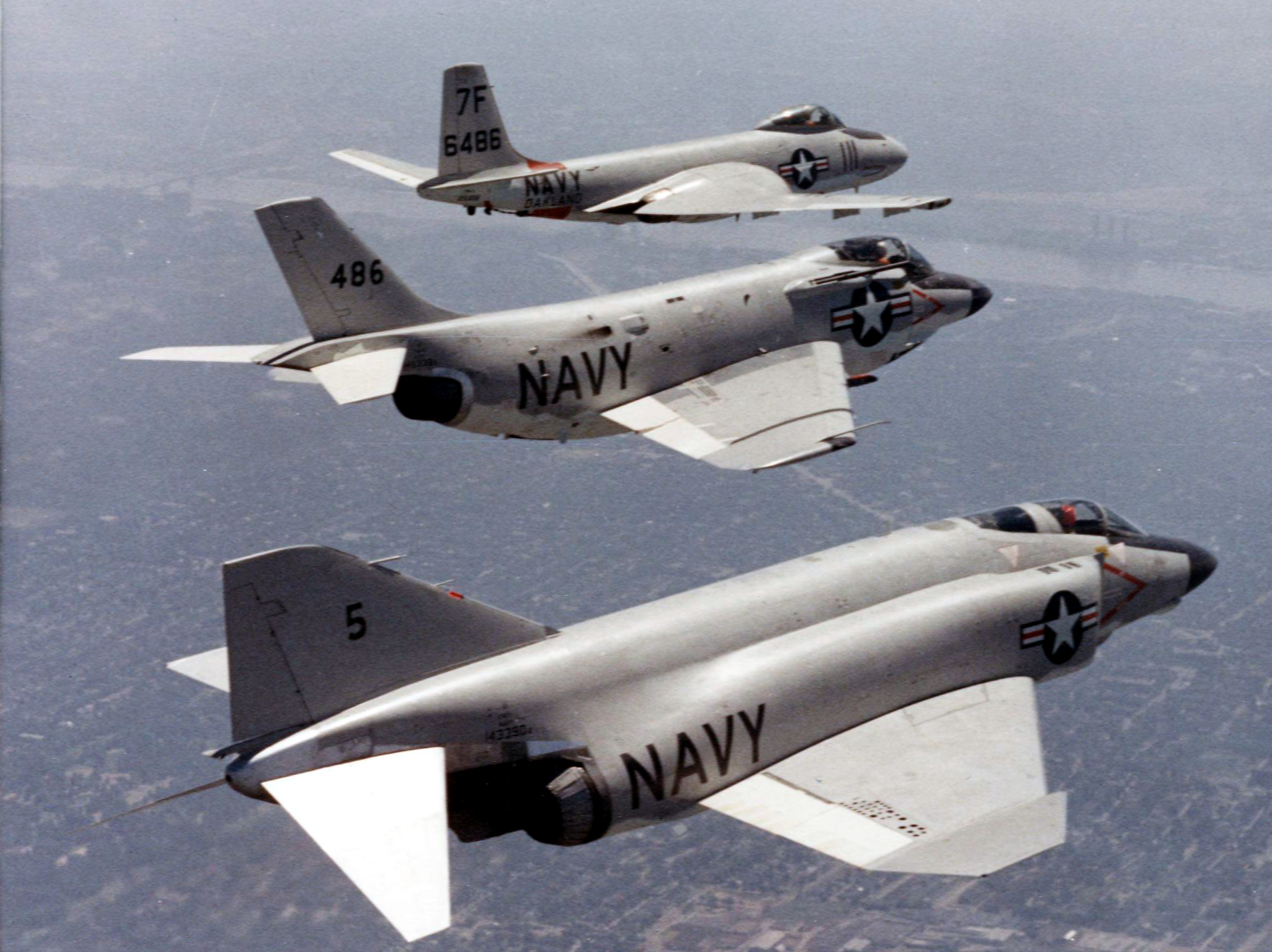
McDonnell F2H Banshee, F3H Demon, and F4H Phantom II

=== Aircraft ===
Model name	First flight	Number built	Type
McDonnell XP-67	1944	1	Prototype twin piston engine interceptor fighter
McDonnell FH Phantom	1945	62	Twin jet engine fighter
McDonnell XHJH-1 Whirlaway	1946	1	Twin piston engine helicopter
McDonnell F2H Banshee	1947	895	Twin jet engine fighter
McDonnell XH-20 Little Henry	1947	2	Prototype twin ramjet light helicopter
McDonnell XF-85 Goblin	1948	2	Prototype single jet engine parasite fighter
McDonnell XF-88 Voodoo	1948	2	Prototype twin jet engine fighter
McDonnell F3H Demon	1951	519	Single jet engine fighter
McDonnell XV-1	1954	2	Experimental single piston engine compound gyroplane
McDonnell F-101 Voodoo	1954	807	Twin jet engine fighter
McDonnell 120	1957	2	Experimental three ramjet light helicopter
McDonnell F-4 Phantom II	1958	5,195 (Note: This includes aircraft built by McDonnell Douglas and Mitsubishi Heavy Industries.)	Twin jet engine fighter
McDonnell 119 (Note: Renamed the McDonnell 220.)	1959	1	Prototype four engine business jet

=== Crewed spacecraft ===
- Mercury capsule
- Gemini capsule
- ASSET spaceplane

=== Missiles and drones ===
- ADM-20 Quail
- LBD Gargoyle
- TD2D/KDD/KDH Katydid target drone, 1942

=== Aircraft engines ===
- PJ42 pulse-jet engine

=== Selected projects ===
- McDonnell HRH, two engine compound gyroplane transport for US Marine Corps, 1950
- McDonnell HCH, two engine heavy-lift helicopter for US Navy, 1952
- McDonnell 188, four engine short takeoff and landing (STOL) transport, proposed licensed production of Bréguet 941, 1961

== Leadership ==
=== President ===
1. James Smith McDonnell Jr., 1939–1962
2. David Sloan Lewis Jr., 1962–1967

=== Chairman of the Board ===
1. James Smith McDonnell Jr., 1962–1967
