= 2024 United States drone sightings =

Widespread reports of unidentified UAVs

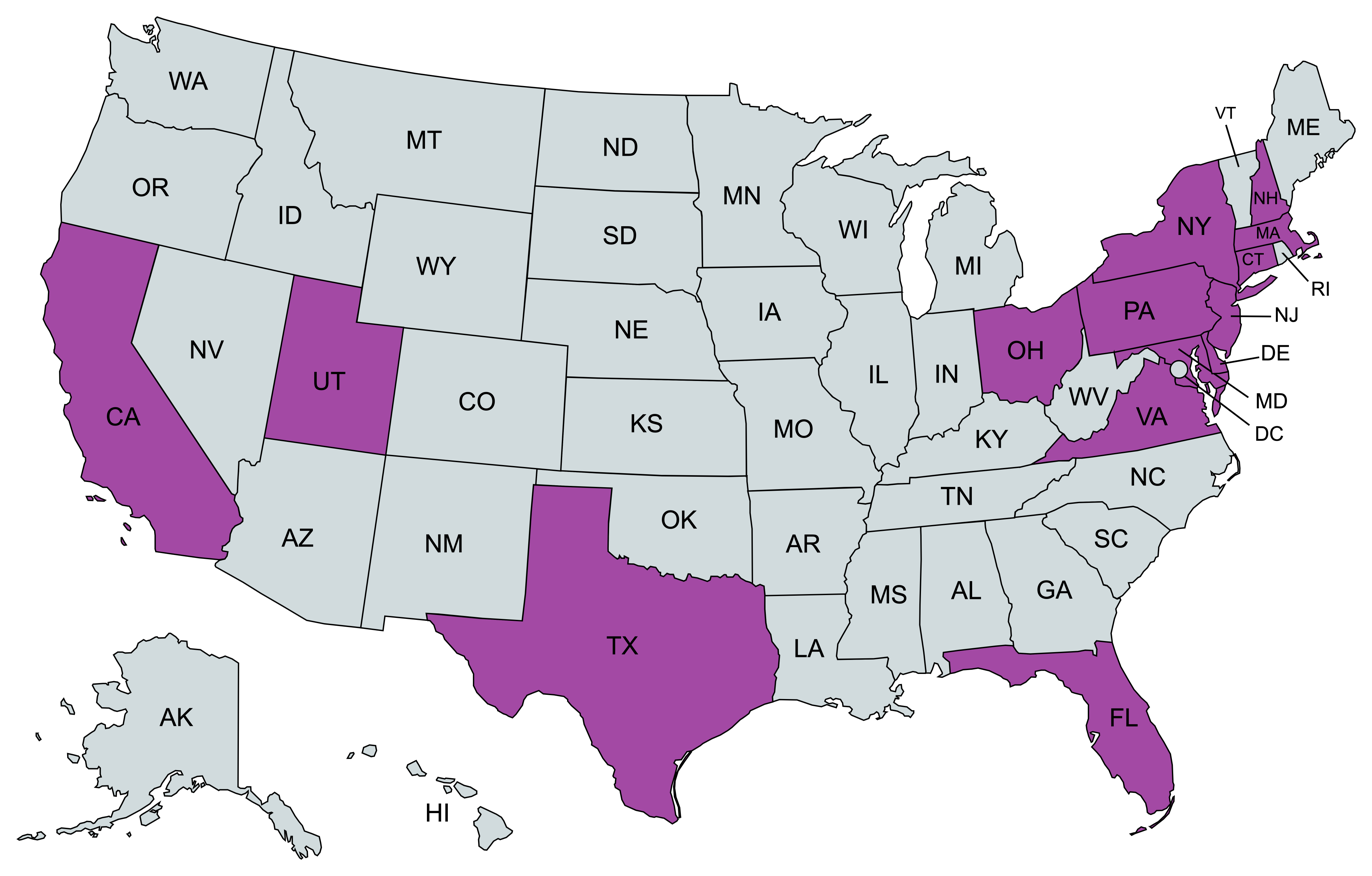
- States where drone sightings were reported
- Date: November 13 – December 2024
- Location: United States (primarily Northeast)
- Also known as: New Jersey drone sightings
- Type: Mass reports of drones
- Main causes: Misidentified objects; Authorized drones

In late 2024, widespread reports of drones emerged across the United States. From November to December, thousands of witnesses described seeing drones—also known as unmanned aerial vehicles—flying at night. The sightings began in New Jersey and subsequently spread to neighboring states, including New York and Pennsylvania. Reports soon emerged across the Northeast and other parts of the country. While investigators determined the reports mainly consisted of authorized drones and misidentified objects, military officials confirmed a concurrent pattern of unauthorized incursions over sensitive defense installations.

Sightings were reported over military installations, such as Picatinny Arsenal and Naval Weapons Station Earle in New Jersey, as well as civilian infrastructure and residential areas. Prominent reports included drones preventing a medical evacuation, following a Coast Guard vessel, and spraying "gray mist". These specific incidents were found to be commercial aircraft or atmospheric phenomena. Other purported drones were debunked as the constellation Orion or the planet Venus.

Federal investigators examined over 5,000 reports but found no evidence of threats or anomalous activity. A joint statement by the Department of Defense (DoD), Department of Homeland Security (DHS), Federal Aviation Administration (FAA), and Federal Bureau of Investigation (FBI) concluded most sightings were authorized drones, misidentified manned aircraft, and other routine objects. Independent experts agreed, with some describing the event as a mass panic, comparable to earlier episodes in American history. Others cited factors such as confirmation bias or social contagion as contributing to the wave of reports. DoD officials stated that unauthorized drones regularly flew over military bases and were usually harmless. Despite this, some analysts and officials suspected certain sightings were of foreign surveillance drones due to their appearance and behavior.

Government responses included briefings with elected officials and flight restrictions over sensitive areas in New York and New Jersey. Some authorities called for enhanced counter-drone powers and interagency coordination. Online attention to drone sightings surged, with misleading viral videos and images on social media fueling public confusion. The sightings prompted new legislative efforts and the extension of existing counter-drone powers into 2025.

In January 2025, the Trump administration stated the aircraft were primarily FAA-authorized drones. Later that year, military officials confirmed hundreds of drone incursions over bases during 2024 and announced a new counter-drone rapid reaction force. New legislation was also introduced in Congress to help manage drones and mitigate threats.

== Background ==
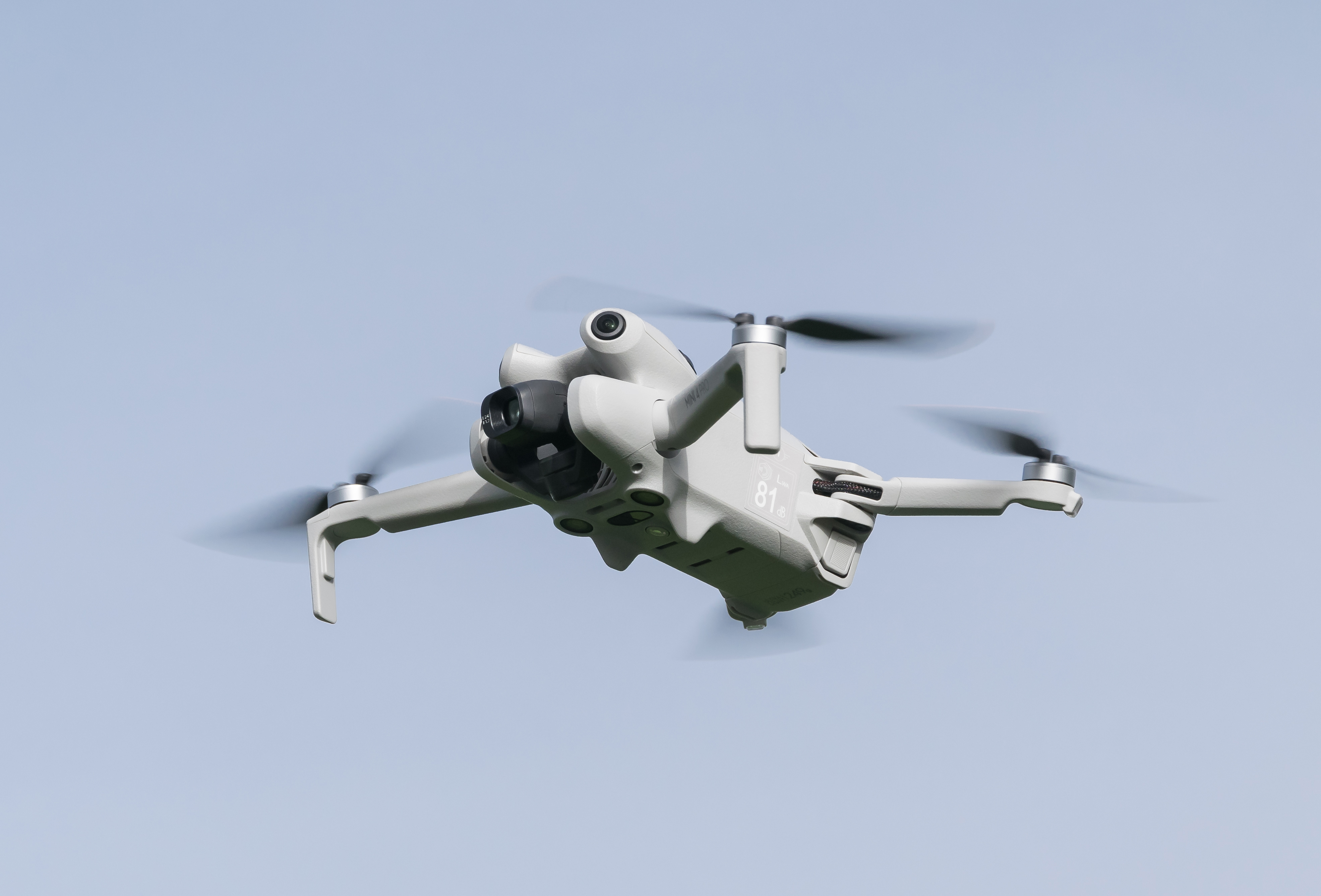
A typical consumer drone in flight

A drone is an aircraft controlled remotely without an onboard pilot. These vehicles serve a broad range of functions for the military, businesses, and recreational enthusiasts. The 2024 sightings occurred against a backdrop of increasing drone prevalence and high-profile incidents involving unmanned aircraft. London Gatwick Airport was forced to cancel flights for several days in December 2018 due to drone reports near its runways. Prior unidentified drone sightings in the US include a rash of reports over Colorado and Nebraska in late 2019 and early 2020. In early 2023, an unmanned spy balloon originating from China flew over parts of the United States, including military sites. Significant drone incursions occurred over Langley Air Force Base, Virginia, in December 2023, prompting a response involving US government aircraft.

Based on 2023 data, the FAA estimated the number of commercial and recreational drones operating in the United States would reach nearly 2.8 million in 2024. In August 2024, sightings over Plant 42, a classified aircraft manufacturing plant of the US Air Force in California, were confirmed by the Air Force and led to new FAA airspace restrictions. The United States Northern Command (USNORTHCOM) hosted an October 2024 demonstration of counter-drone technologies in Colorado. The trials, dubbed "Falcon Peak", came as a response to the observations over Langley Air Force Base. One of the systems tested had been used in combat in the Russo-Ukrainian war. Unidentified drones were reported over US bases in the United Kingdom in November 2024, followed by sightings over Ramstein Air Base and arms factories in Germany in December 2024.

== Reported sightings ==
2024 United States drone sightings (New Jersey)

Reports of unidentified drones began in New Jersey in mid-November 2024 before expanding across numerous other states. The first sighting occurred at Picatinny Arsenal in Morris County, New Jersey, on November 13. Additional observations were reported in Morris County by November 18 and the neighboring Somerset County shortly after. The sightings, initially concentrating around the Raritan River corridor, soon spread across New Jersey. Reports eventually extended throughout the Northeast, (Note: Reports eventually extended to New York City (NYC), Orange County (New York), Philadelphia, and various parts of eastern Pennsylvania.) with later sightings emerging across the continental United States. (Note: Sightings emerged in California, Connecticut, Delaware, Florida, Maryland, Massachusetts, New Hampshire, Ohio, Texas, Utah, and Virginia.)

Witnesses described sightings over residential areas and near sensitive locations, including military installations, emergency communication centers, law enforcement facilities, and Round Valley Reservoir in New Jersey. Drones were also reportedly observed near infrastructure such as highways, railroads, transmission lines, and nuclear power plants in New Jersey and New York. Observers described drones that emitted a loud hum, were as large as cars, or flew without navigation lights. Some described the drones as flying in groups or alongside fixed-wing aircraft. Some experts who reviewed footage categorized the objects as either quadcopters or fixed-wing aircraft.

By late December 2024, reports in northern New Jersey had slowed significantly. This trend was mirrored online, where the social media-driven panic began to subside. Online search interest in the topic had "plummeted to two points out of 100" by January 12, 2025, down from its peak of 100 in mid-December, according to researchers.

=== Sightings involving armed forces ===
Military personnel and security officials reported multiple incursions and suspicious aerial activities over defense installations. Numerous drone sightings were reported over Picatinny Arsenal and Naval Weapons Station Earle in New Jersey, with some accounts coming from what military officials described as highly trained security personnel. The first confirmed observation, witnessed by a police or security officer, was reported on November 13, 2024. That day, a contractor at Picatinny Arsenal reported seeing "a light rising straight up from the tree line and toward the arsenal." A month later, multiple drone incursions were again reported, this time over Naval Weapons Station Earle. In response, the Joint Chiefs of Staff issued a statement confirming some sightings. They stated that the DoD did not know who operated the drones but that there was no indication of involvement by adversary nations. The statement said officials could not locate the drone operators or origin points, and noted the DoD lacks authority to pursue drones beyond base perimeters without law enforcement help.

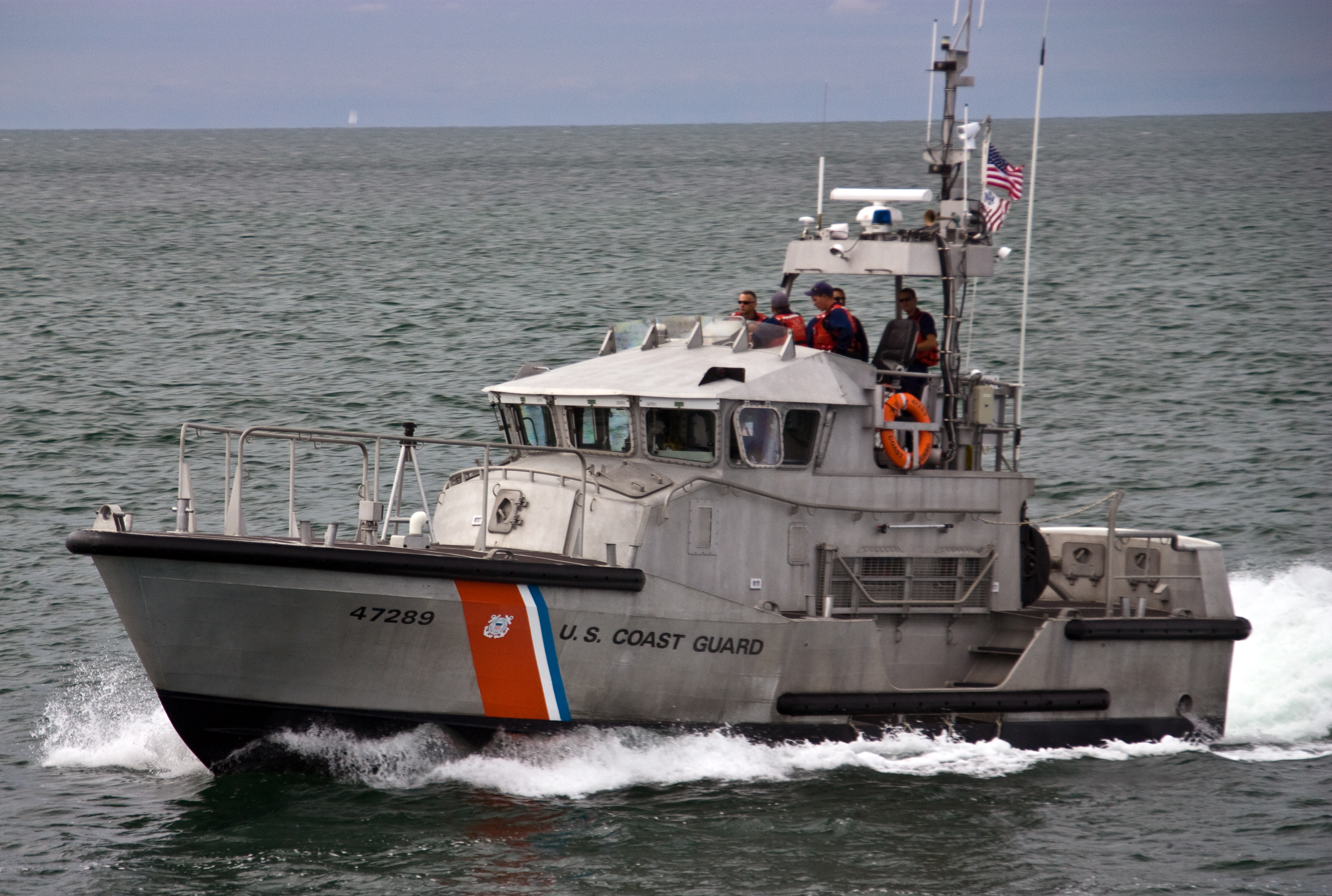
Drones were reported to follow a United States Coast Guard 47-foot Motor Lifeboat.

Legislators Chris Smith and Paul Kanitra claimed that multiple drones followed a United States Coast Guard 47-foot Motor Lifeboat. Coast Guard officer Luke Pinneo stated that "multiple low-altitude aircraft were observed in the vicinity" of one of their vessels. White House spokesperson John Kirby said the reported aircraft were commercial flights approaching John F. Kennedy International Airport (JFK), not drones, based on forensic analysis. Smith challenged this explanation, emphasizing the experience of the officers involved. Later, Transportation Security Administration (TSA) documents revealed that the drone swarms reported by coast guardsmen were actually commercial jets aligning for landing at JFK. The aircraft made S-shaped maneuvers while approaching the airport, creating an illusion of hovering when viewed from certain perspectives.

On December 9, 2024, federal officials arrested a Chinese national for flying a drone over Vandenberg Space Force Base in Southern California. Police apprehended the individual while he attempted to board a flight to China at San Francisco International Airport. The following day, a press release from Hill Air Force Base in Utah acknowledged recent observations of "unidentified drone swarms" over several US military bases, confirming nearby sightings that did not affect operations. Unauthorized drones flew over Marine Corps Base Camp Pendleton in California with six incursions from December 9 into the following week. Wright-Patterson Air Force Base in Ohio experienced airspace closures in mid-December due to incursions by small drones. Shortly after, police in White Settlement, Texas, confirmed an investigation involving the FBI, Naval Criminal Investigative Service, and the Air Force into drone incidents at Naval Air Station Joint Reserve Base Fort Worth and a nearby National Guard armory.

=== Sightings by civilians ===
Civilian reports came from a range of sources, including law enforcement, politicians, and observers near critical infrastructure. Law enforcement reportedly observed drone activity on November 18, 2024, in New Jersey. Near the end of the month, reports of drone activity near Raritan Valley Community College (RVCC) in New Jersey prevented a medical evacuation helicopter from transporting a car crash victim. RVCC security supervisor Brian Serge commented, "We never found out what the actual drones were." The TSA later released documents showing that three aircraft approaching Solberg Airport (N51) near the school had been misidentified as drones. The TSA's analysis concluded that because the aircraft were flying directly towards the observers on the ground, they appeared to hover. In a separate incident on December 12, a drone was described as spraying "gray mist" over Clinton, New Jersey. According to TSA documents released in 2025, investigators identified this with high confidence as a Beechcraft Baron 58 propeller plane experiencing turbulence, which created wingtip vortices that formed condensation clouds. On the same day in Pequannock Township, a drone crashed, which was initially reported as "military-grade". A police investigation determined it was a toy drone, with officials suggesting it was one of multiple copycat incidents in the area.

United States Senator Andy Kim reported observing drones near the Round Valley Reservoir during a December 12 patrol with Clinton Township Police. He later acknowledged that the majority of the suspected drones were probably airplanes. On December 13, former Maryland Governor Larry Hogan posted a video on X showing what he believed to be numerous large drones over his Davidsonville, Maryland, residence. However, several individuals, including journalist Steven Greenstreet, meteorologist Matthew Cappucci, and University of Maryland Observatory director Elizabeth Warner, identified the objects in the video as the constellation Orion. Greenstreet also noted that flight data indicated the presence of three aircraft in the vicinity at the time. Subsequently, a community note was added to Hogan's post, stating that no unusual objects were visible in his video. Late-night comedian Stephen Colbert joked about the misidentification during his monologue.

A number of drones were reported flying near civilian infrastructure in December 2024. One sighting near the Salem Nuclear Power Plant in New Jersey was later identified by TSA investigators as coinciding with the flight paths of a UH-60 Black Hawk helicopter, a Cessna C150, and commercial flights from Philadelphia. New York City's Staten Island Borough President Vito Fossella said on December 13 that there were sightings over city facilities. (Note: Facilities included Port Liberty New York, the Goethals Bridge, the Verrazzano–Narrows Bridge, and Fort Wadsworth.) On the same day, Stewart International Airport (SWF) in Orange County, New York, shut down for an hour due to drone activity, an event subsequently confirmed by Governor Kathy Hochul. In Massachusetts, Boston Police identified three local residents operating drones in restricted airspace near Logan International Airport. Police located two of the men on an island in Boston Harbor and arrested them. Officers requested assistance from State Police to locate the third suspect, but he was not apprehended. Police warned that even small drones can pose a deadly risk to planes and helicopters.

== Investigations and findings ==
The FBI led an interagency investigation into the drone sightings involving various federal and state agencies. Federal investigators did not identify any suspects or recover any drones, and by mid-December 2024, they had determined that most sightings had mundane explanations. State and local investigations into the drone reports came to similar conclusions.

=== Federal investigation ===
The FBI initiated its investigation on December 3, 2024, by requesting that the public report any sightings of suspected drones near the Raritan River in New Jersey. A spokesperson told Congress on December 10 that despite collecting over 3,000 reports from the public via a tip line, investigators had not determined a full explanation.

New Jersey Assemblywoman Dawn Fantasia shared her notes from a legislative briefing on December 11 with officials from the DHS, the State Police, and the New Jersey Office of Homeland Security. She said that the officials described drones measuring up to six feet (1.8 m) in diameter operating for six to seven hours per night, sometimes flying with their lights off. Her summary also said the drones seemed to "operate in a coordinated manner", evaded typical means of detection, and did not appear to be flown by hobbyists.

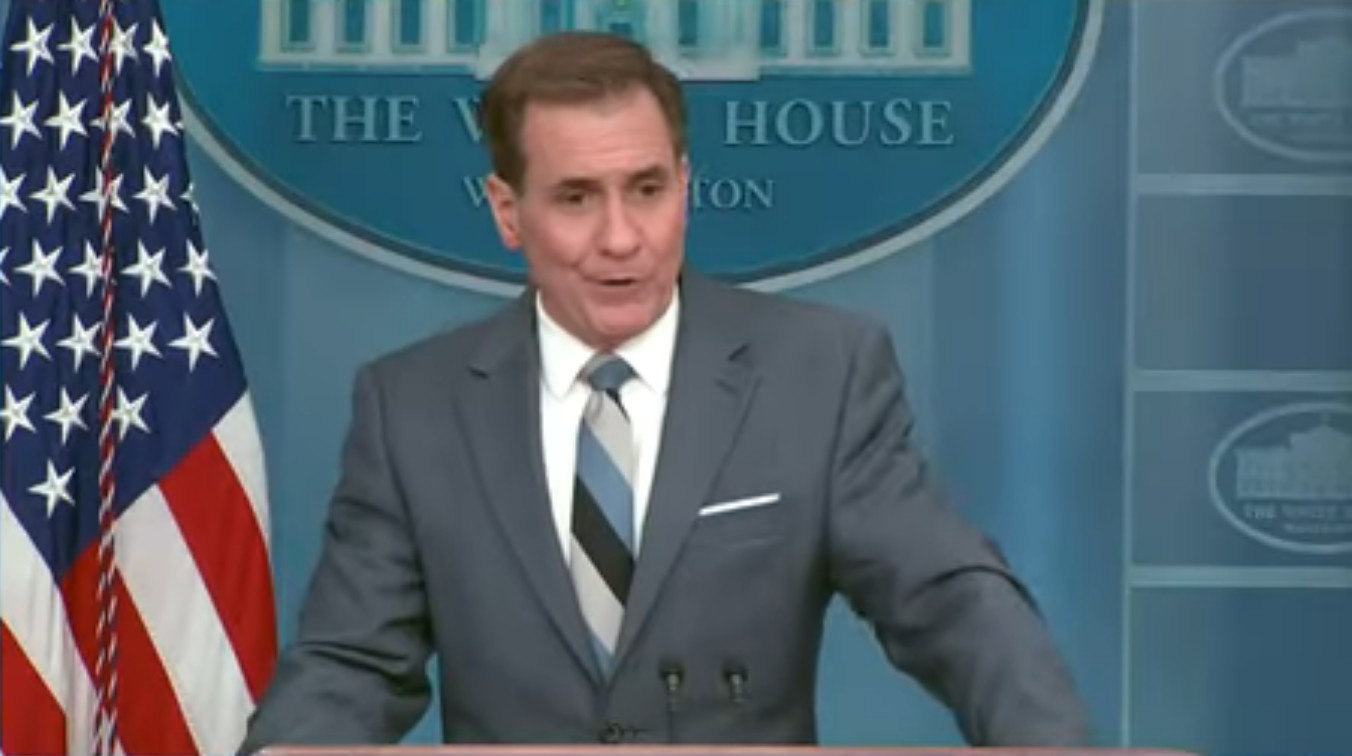
John Kirby, the White House National Security Communications Advisor

Kirby stated on December 12 that none of the visual observations could be verified and that many reports were actually lawfully-operated manned aircraft. He emphasized that there was no evidence suggesting these sightings pose a security threat or originate from foreign sources. Kirby noted that an analysis of photos, videos, and electronic detection data had not revealed any unauthorized drones. Despite this, Kirby confirmed that authorities would continue to investigate, and urged Congress to pass legislation for more effective drone management. New Jersey assemblymen Paul Kanitra and Greg Myhre said that Kirby's statements seemed to contradict the briefing that happened a day prior.

Also that day, the DHS issued a statement echoing Kirby's remarks. The department acknowledged the general threat posed by drones and highlighted a lack of "sufficient authorities" to combat them. The statement also mentioned previous instances where reported drones were cases of mistaken identity. In an ABC News interview on December 15, Secretary of Homeland Security Alejandro Mayorkas confirmed some drone sightings. Others, he noted, could be explained as misidentified manned aircraft. Mayorkas stated that federal resources, including personnel and technology, had been deployed to assist the New Jersey State Police in addressing these sightings.

On December 16, a joint statement was issued by the DoD, DHS, FAA, and FBI. The agencies said that their investigation, which reviewed over 5,000 reported sightings, failed to identify "anything anomalous". They concluded that most sightings had routine explanations, such as commercial or hobbyist drones, law enforcement drones, or conventional aircraft, and therefore did not present a public safety or national security risk. The statement noted that sightings over restricted military airspace were "not new" and that the DoD considers unauthorized incursions a serious matter.

TSA documents revealed that by December 17, 2024—the day before the FAA imposed flight restrictions—the agency had already internally debunked several high-profile drone incidents as misidentified phenomena. The TSA did not initially share the findings with the public; they were only released later through a Freedom of Information Act request. Reason magazine suggested that withholding this evidence prolonged public concern while helping justify calls for expanded counter-drone governmental powers.

=== State and local investigations ===
State and local authorities launched their own inquiries and deployed detection technologies to address the surge in reports. In early December, law enforcement officials in New Jersey raised concerns regarding drones. Bridgewater Police Chief John Mitzak stated on December 13 that many of the sightings involved misidentified manned aircraft. Several days later, Governor Phil Murphy said that deployed drone-detecting devices had found scant evidence of threats. In New York City, the police received about 120 calls reporting drones during the weekend of December 14–15, surpassing all calls received in the previous month. Upon investigation, many of these sightings were found to be misidentifications of manned aircraft, meteor showers, or Venus. In some instances, hobbyist drones flown in response to rumors of anomalous drones led to further reports of unusual activity. In response to these events, Hochul announced on December 15 that the federal government would provide New York with a drone detection system. Chuck Schumer, the US Senator from New York, also requested a similar system for New Jersey.

The Connecticut State Police announced the deployment of drone detection systems in response to sightings on December 13, specifically in Fairfield County. State police added that most sightings appeared to be manned aircraft or legal private-sector drones. Connecticut Governor Ned Lamont noted that one sighted drone was likely a Frontier Airlines aircraft since it displayed the airline's logo. Governors Maura Healey of Massachusetts and Glenn Youngkin of Virginia confirmed state investigations into the increasing sightings on December 14, with Youngkin citing concerns over national security and critical infrastructure. Pennsylvania Governor Josh Shapiro ordered Pennsylvania State Police to investigate the sightings, and confirmed law enforcement would use helicopters to pursue and determine the drones' origin and purpose.

== Responses ==
=== Federal executive responses ===
The executive branch monitored the situation closely while regulatory bodies implemented flight restrictions over sensitive areas. The White House confirmed that President Joe Biden was aware of the drone sightings on December 10, 2024. The next day, Mayorkas briefed Murphy and New Jersey's Congressional delegation on the sightings. In his first comments on December 18, Biden said there was no sign of danger or anything suspicious happening, though officials continued tracking the situation amid heavy authorized drone activity in the area.

The Federal Aviation Administration banned the use of drones in multiple areas in New Jersey and New York State. On November 22, 2024, they issued a two-week flight restriction over Donald Trump's Bedminster golf club and, days later, a month-long restriction over Picatinny Arsenal. The golf course restriction was subsequently extended for another two weeks. On December 18, the FAA issued a one-month ban on drone operations near 22 communities in New Jersey, including Camden, Elizabeth, and Jersey City. The next day, they issued a ban on drone flights over parts of New York State, including Brooklyn, Queens, and communities in Long Island. The FAA said the restrictions were due to "special security reasons" and were requested by other federal authorities. Hochul said that the restricted areas include "critical infrastructure sites" and that the action was precautionary.

The FAA implemented several new drone restrictions on December 30. These restrictions took place in various parts of New Jersey, all of which were set to last until January 18, 2025. The new rules were imposed across areas in Gloucester County, Hudson County, Middlesex County, Monmouth County, and Union County.

=== Responses by New Jersey officials ===
Governor Phil Murphy
(@GovMurphy)
tweeted:

I wrote to @POTUS to express my concerns about reports of unmanned aircraft systems in and around NJ airspace. Since existing laws limit the ability of state and local law enforcement to counter UAS, more federal resources are needed to understand what is behind this activity.

December 13, 2024

New Jersey State Senator Jon Bramnick suggested a "limited state of emergency" on December 10. He also proposed a temporary ban on drone use until the situation was resolved. Murphy wrote to Biden on December 13, expressing "growing concern" about the drone reports. He requested improved coordination between agencies and additional congressional authorization for state and local law enforcement to counter drone activities.

=== Congressional responses ===
In mid-December, several United States Senators formally requested federal support and transparency regarding the sightings. Senators Cory Booker, Kirsten Gillibrand, Kim, and Schumer, sent a letter to the FBI, DHS and FAA on December 12, requesting briefings on their efforts to address the situation. On December 15, Schumer requested the Department of Homeland Security deploy specialized drone detection systems to New York and New Jersey. On the same day, Senator Amy Klobuchar called for more transparency and a Senate briefing on the sightings. Senator Richard Blumenthal suggested using electronic jamming to take down the drones.

Mayorkas called on Congress to extend and expand existing authority to conduct drone oversight, which were provided by the FAA Reauthorization Act of 2018 and neared expiration. On December 20, the Senate passed a bill extending those powers until September 30, 2025, when they ultimately did expire.

The "Safeguarding the Homeland from the Threats Posed by Unmanned Aircraft Systems Act of 2023" was introduced by Senator Gary Peters. The bill, endorsed by Schumer and Murphy to help address the sightings, would grant the DHS and Department of Justice (DOJ) new authority to detect and mitigate drone threats. The bill was blocked by Senator Rand Paul who cited surveillance concerns.

A congressional subcommittee held a December hearing on the bipartisan "Counter-UAS Authority Security, Safety, and Reauthorization Act", which would expand federal drone-countering powers. Hochul released a statement supporting the legislation. The bill did not pass by the end of the Congressional term. Other failed bills in 2024 included H.R. 4333, which proposed a pilot program to equip law enforcement for drone mitigation; and H.R. 9949, which would have directed the FAA to establish temporary flight restrictions over outdoor music festivals.

=== Social media ===
Social media platforms played a significant role in driving public interest and disseminating misinformation regarding the sightings. Murphy said the reported sightings prompted the spread of conspiracy theories across social media. Conversely, aerospace expert Jamey Jacob stated that social media largely drove the wave of reports. According to researchers at Montclair State University, online activity related to drone observations surged in November and December, with fear being the dominant emotion expressed in the social media posts analyzed. A number of videos claiming to show suspicious drones were widely circulated, and later debunked as being mislabelled, deceptively edited, or AI-generated. Popular Science reported that TikTok hosted "some of the most blatant and widely seen fake videos" related to the sightings.

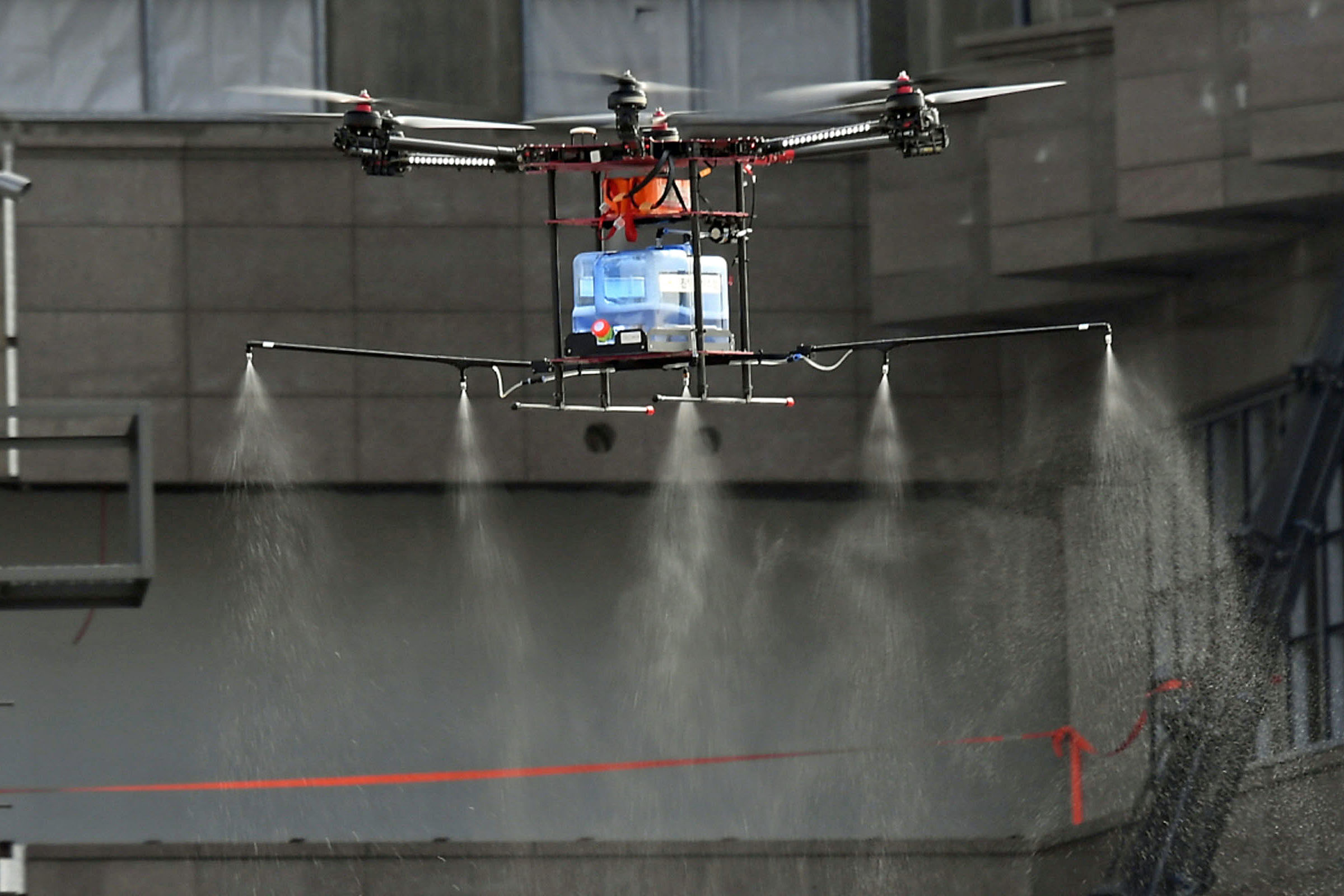
A drone spraying disinfectant

A video on Threads claiming to show numerous drones over a US city was found to be two-year-old footage from China, depicting government drones dispersing disinfectant during the COVID-19 pandemic. Another video on Instagram, which ostensibly showed gunfire towards a drone, was later revealed by its creator to have been edited with sound and visual effects. A social media post by Pennsylvania State Senator Doug Mastriano included an image of a "crashed drone", which was actually a replica of a TIE fighter from the Star Wars franchise. In other instances, videos labelled as unidentified drones were actually recordings of drone light shows, some of which were several years old.

=== Other responses ===
Then President-elect Trump suggested on December 13 that the US military should shoot down unidentified drones. He later said that the government knew the source of the reported drones, and added that he cancelled a trip to his New Jersey golf club due to nearby sightings. Weeks before taking office, Trump promised to release a report on the drone sightings approximately one day into his term.

Colbert told several jokes about the drone sightings during his monologue for The Late Show with Stephen Colbert on December 16, 2024. Comedian Bowen Yang performed a skit during the December 21 episode of Saturday Night Live in which he portrayed an anthropomorphic drone of the type purportedly seen in New Jersey.

CBS News and YouGov surveyed over 2,000 Americans from December 18–20 about the sightings. Results showed that 78% of Americans believed the US government was withholding information from the public. More than half viewed the drones as a threat to the United States.

== Proposed explanations ==
=== Misidentified objects ===
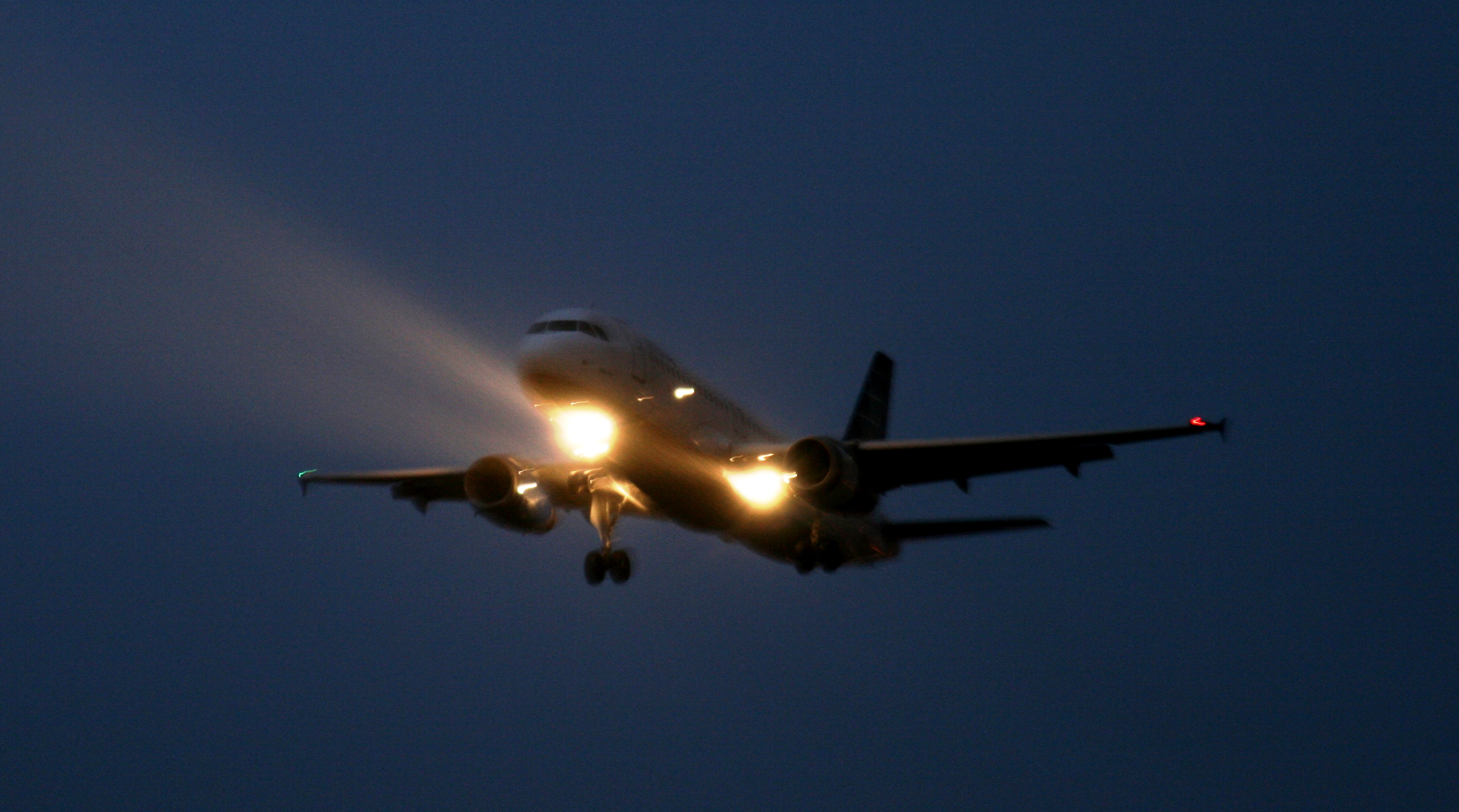
Manned aircraft were a common source of misidentifications.

Experts and analysts largely attributed the sightings to misperceptions of conventional aerial objects and astronomical phenomena. Drone expert William Austin analyzed imagery and reports, concluding that many "large drones" were likely misidentified manned aircraft, cell tower lights, or smaller drones. After reviewing extensive video evidence, Austin stated that all of the sightings were either misidentified airplanes or small drones whose use had increased due to media coverage. He suggested the parallax effect as a possible cause for some misidentifications.

Vijay Kumar, dean of Penn Engineering, stated that most images showed legally operating aircraft and that popular fear about drones was due to their association with autonomous robots in science fiction and popular culture, and concerns about surveillance. Similarly, Missy Cummings, a professor of engineering at George Mason University and drone researcher, said that people were probably seeing stars, aircraft, or reflections. She noted that drones were the least likely explanations, since it is "actually pretty hard to pick these out of the sky".

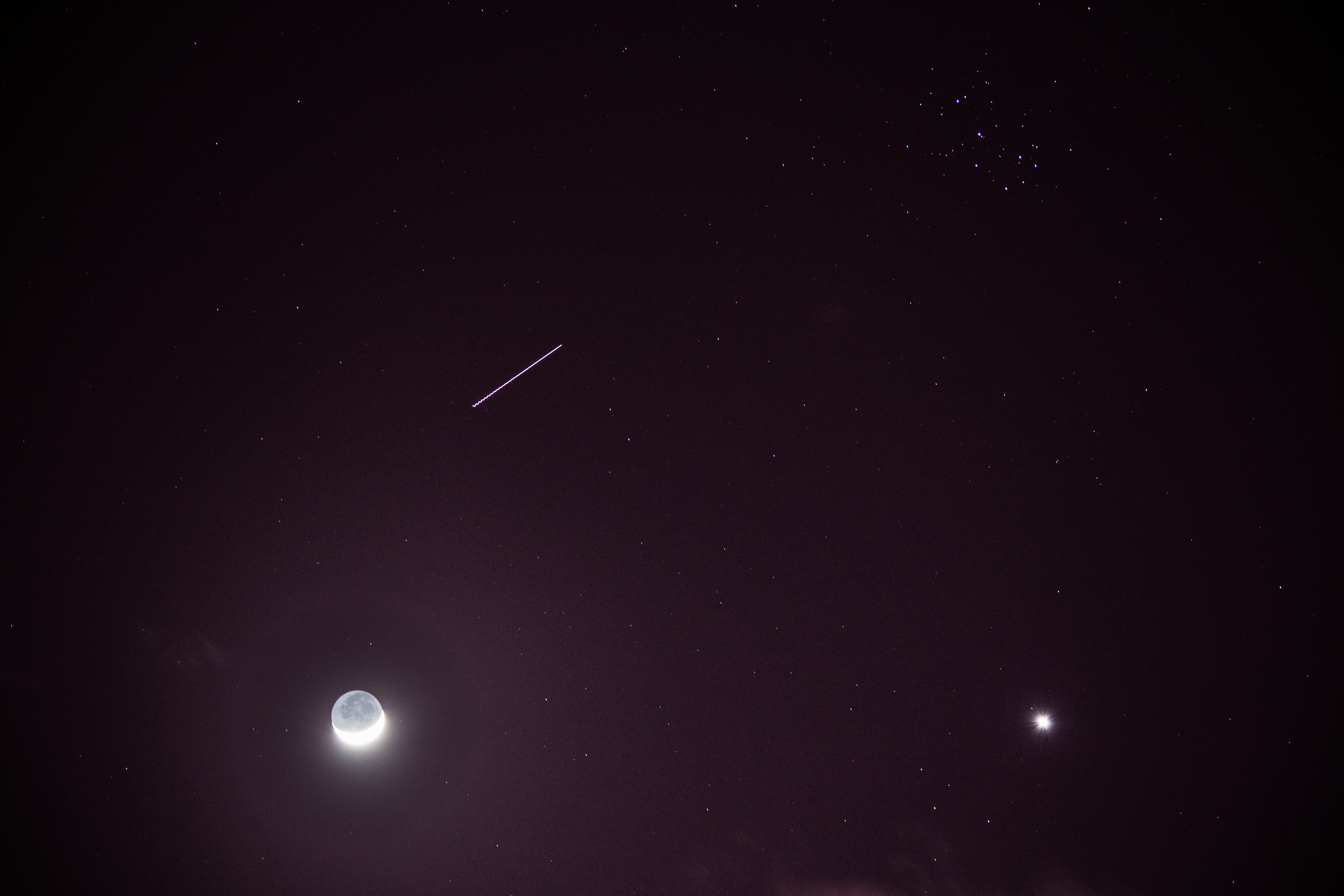
Celestial objects were frequently mistaken as drones. Pictured: the Moon, Venus, Pleiades, and a satellite.

Amie Gallagher, a planetarium director, suggested autokinesis as a possible explanation for some sightings. She described this phenomenon as an illusion of motion created when a person's eye muscles attempt to focus while staring at a celestial object. Skeptic Mick West proposed that many sightings were likely misidentifications and that videos purportedly showing unusual objects could be explained by the limitations of smartphone cameras.

Former United States Representative Adam Kinzinger stated on CNN that after reviewing many videos of alleged drones, he concluded that all of them were airplanes. He suggested that public concern arose from misidentification of high-altitude jets. Similarly, Tom Adams, a counter-drone defense consultant and former FBI agent, blamed "hysteria" for manned aircraft being mistaken for drones. According to Adams, nighttime observers frequently confuse objects like manned aircraft, planets, satellites, and the International Space Station with drones.

The FBI and New Jersey State Police warned residents against targeting suspected drones with lasers or firearms, noting that many were actually manned aircraft. Authorities emphasized that shooting at aircraft risked occupant safety while lasers could hit the eyes of pilots.

=== Ordinary drones ===
According to defense correspondent Kyle Mizokami of Popular Mechanics, the most likely reason for the drone sightings was people noticing ordinary drones which had been around for years. Brandon Valeriano, a professor and cybersecurity specialist at Seton Hall University, said the observations were probably connected to hobbyist drone use, and that some members of the public had sought "wild explanations for the things they can't understand". Jamey Jacob, a professor in aerospace engineering at Oklahoma State University, suggest that careless drone operators were the likely cause of most sightings near military facilities.

The FAA estimated that nearly 2.8 million drones would operate in the United States in 2024, and the White House confirmed that over a million drones were registered with the FAA as of 2024, with "thousands of commercial, hobbyist and law enforcement drones that are lawfully in the sky on any given day". In January 2025, White House press secretary Karoline Leavitt said the drones were indeed authorized by the FAA.

=== Psychological and social explanations ===
Academics and journalists described the wave of drone reports as the result of social or psychological phenomena. Neurologist William J. Bernstein suggested the phenomenon could be a case of mass delusion, a view echoed by expert Gary Small, who described it as a shared delusion or mass panic.

Sociologist Robert Bartholomew characterized the 2024 sightings as a social panic, drawing parallels to World War I when unexplained lights over New Jersey and Delaware were blamed on German espionage. He argued that media coverage prompted people to pay closer attention to the sky, noticing conventional air traffic they would normally ignore. Bartholomew attributed this phenomenon to geopolitical tensions and government distrust, describing it as a convergence of two modern moral panics in America: the fear of new technologies and the fear of foreigners.

Historian Max Boot proposed that "mass hysteria", which he identified as "a recurring feature of American life", could be a partial explanation for the sightings. Similarly, journalist Tyler Rogoway suggested "mass hysteria" along with misidentified aircraft as potential causes. While sometimes equated with mass panic, mass hysteria technically involves the onset of symptoms.

Space photographer Andrew McCarthy asserted that all the videos he reviewed showed only ordinary helicopters or planes. He proposed that the sightings were a "social contagion", where people were simply noticing and misinterpreting regular air traffic. An astronomy professor suggested that the widespread observations might have stemmed from confirmation bias, leading the public to misinterpret mundane phenomena. Science writer Michael Shermer described the sightings as an example of "patternicity"—the tendency to see meaningful patterns in both meaningful and meaningless noise—noting that low-quality nighttime images left room for imaginative interpretation. Science writer Greg Redfern compared the episode to recurring UFO flaps seen throughout US history.

Speculation surrounding the sightings also intersected with individual mental health struggles. On January 1, 2025, Matthew Livelsberger, a soldier and drone warfare specialist, committed suicide in a car bombing in Las Vegas. In a suicide note sent to a podcast, he claimed the reported drones were "gravitic propulsion systems" used by China and the U.S. The FBI later characterized the incident as "tragic", noting that Livelsberger suffered from post-traumatic stress disorder (PTSD).

=== Foreign drones ===
Federal investigators repeatedly rejected the notion that foreign countries were the source of the sightings. Pentagon spokesperson Patrick S. Ryder commented that while private drones periodically fly over military bases, most are not considered threats and do not affect operations. In early December, Congressman Jeff Van Drew claimed that an Iranian mothership was the source of the drones. Later that day, the Pentagon refuted his statements, stating there were no Iranian vessels off the U.S. coast and no proof the drones originated from foreign adversaries. Murphy also questioned Iran's capability for such a mission. Congressman Michael McCaul, chair of the House Foreign Affairs Committee, said in mid-December that he believed some of the unidentified aircraft were "spy drones" from China. Retired United States Air Force general James Poss was skeptical of the foreign adversary explanation because the aircraft used FAA-compliant lighting.

Former USNORTHCOM commander Glen VanHerck gave the foreign drones explanation more credence. He argued that the drones seen over military bases were not operated by hobbyists due to their quantity, size, and flight duration. He speculated that they might have had a foreign origin and were used for surveillance or a show of force. VanHerck criticized the lack of new legislation to address the threat. A report by the Foreign Policy Research Institute argued that the "hysteria-driven false reports" of December 2024 may have masked a spike in authentic drone reports near military sites, demonstrating a "hide in the noise" strategy by foreign actors. The think tank made several recommendations to counter foreign threats, including establishing a joint counter-drone task force and a consolidated database for drone reports. Defense journalists at The War Zone similarly distinguished the civilian reports from verified military incursions, attributing the New Jersey sightings to "mass hysteria" which obscured legitimate national security concerns regarding unauthorized activity over defense installations.

=== Nuclear material search ===
One proposed explanation was that the sighted drones were searching for lost radioactive material – a claim government officials denied. The theory emerged in early December, when the Nuclear Regulatory Commission issued an alert that an object with trace radioactivity had been lost in the Northeast. The mayor of Belleville, New Jersey, suggested the widely seen drones were government-operated, searching for the missing object. Congresswoman Nicole Malliotakis and Staten Island officials wrote to the DHS inquiring about the situation. The object was recovered by mid-December, and the New Jersey Department of Environmental Protection said drones were not used to locate it. Additionally, the National Nuclear Security Administration stated that its emergency response unit did not use drones for radiological detection and was not flying them in the region.

== Aftermath ==
Karoline Leavitt holds a White House press briefing, January 28, 2025

In the months following the initial surge of reports, the government focused on clarifying the nature of the events and strengthening defensive capabilities. On January 28, 2025, Leavitt (the new White House Press Secretary) conveyed an update from President Trump regarding the drone sightings. She explained that following an investigation, it was determined that the aircraft were primarily FAA-authorized research drones and those operated by hobbyists and private individuals. Leavitt noted that public curiosity contributed to the increase in sightings and affirmed that the drones did not represent a threat.

During a Senate Armed Services Committee hearing in February 2025, General Gregory Guillot stated that the military detected 350 drone incursions over 100 US military bases in 2024. Guillot, head of NORAD and USNORTHCOM, emphasized surveillance risks and argued that existing authorities provided by Title 10 U.S. Code Section 130i should be expanded to cover all military installations and their adjacent areas. Guillot also requested expanding 130i authorities to permit "seamless exchange of data" on drone activity with other agencies like the DHS.

The DoD hosted the second annual Falcon Peak counter-drone evaluation in September 2025. At the event, General Guillot announced a new rapid reaction force to respond to drone incursions over military bases. The force was developed using lessons learned from incursions over military bases, including those part of the 2024 sightings. Guillot stated one of the demonstrated systems, produced by Anduril and including low-collateral kinetic interceptors, would be provided to the response teams.

Legislation related to drone management was introduced in the 119th United States Congress. The "DRONE Act of 2025" would allow law enforcement to use federal grants to acquire and operate drones. As of November 2025, this bill remains in committee and has not been signed into law. Separately, the "DEFENSE Act" would grant state and local law enforcement authority to counter aerial threats at major outdoor gatherings, such as sporting events. This bill also remains in committee as of November 2025. Senator Tom Cotton (who sponsored the "DEFENSE Act") successfully introduced an amendment to the 2026 National Defense Authorization Act, granting the DoD expanded authority to contend with drone threats over military installations.

== See also ==
- 1947 flying disc craze – Reports of unidentified flying objects in 1947
- 1952 Washington, D.C., UFO incident – U.S. Capital flying saucer incidents on consecutive weekends
- Battle of Los Angeles – Anti-aircraft shelling during WWII against an imagined invader
- List of unmanned aerial vehicle-related incidents
- List of reported UFO sightings
- Mystery airship – Wave of UFO sightings in the US in 1896/97
- The War of the Worlds (1938 radio drama) – 1938 radio drama by Orson Welles infamous for inciting panic in the listening audience that a Martian invasion was taking place
