= Regulation of UAVs in the United Kingdom =

Regulation of UAVs in the United Kingdom prescribes the rules that operators of unmanned aerial vehicles (commonly known as drones) must follow in the UK.

== History ==
In August 2012, The UK's Civil Aviation Authority (CAA) stated that it would require non-military drones larger than 20 kg to be able to automatically sense other aircraft and steer to avoid them.

As of 2013, the CAA required that UAV aircraft less than 20 kilogrammes in weight must be in direct visual contact with the pilot, cannot fly within 150 metres of a congested area or within 50 metres of a person or vehicle, and cannot be used for commercial activity.

In July 2018, the CAA forbade flying above 400 feet (120 m) and flying within 1 kilometre (0.62 mi) of an airport or airfield boundary.

Between 19 and 21 December 2018, flights were canceled at Gatwick Airport following reports of drone sightings close to the runway.

== Regulation ==
Operators of drones and model aircraft must obtain an 'Operator' ID and 'Flyer ID' from the Civil Aviation Authority before using their drone, which are awarded together after passing an online theory test. Children under the age of 18 cannot obtain an Operator ID, though they can be registered as flyers of their parent or legal guardian's drone by passing the same theory test and receiving a Flyer ID. After passing the theory test, all drones must display the owner's Operator ID when in operation. Flyer IDs must be renewed every three years, while Operator IDs must be renewed annually.

=== Air Navigation Order 2009 ===
The Air Navigation Order 2009 prohibited individuals from flying unmanned aircraft within 50 metres of any vessel, vehicle or structure which is not under their control, except in cases where the individual has obtained permission from the CAA.

=== Drone code ===
The first edition of the Drone Code was published in 2015.

In 2016, the Civil Aviation Authority updated the Drone Code to list the following regulations, forming the acronym DRONE:

- Don’t fly near airports or airfields,
- Remember to stay below 400 feet (120 m),
- Observe your drone at all times – stay 150 feet (46 m) away from people and 500 feet (150 m) away from crowds and structures,
- Never fly near aircraft and
- Enjoy responsibly

Further:

- Follow the manufacturer's instructions.

=== Air Navigation Order 2016 ===
The Air Navigation Order 2016 replaced the Air Navigation Order 2009.

The order prohibits acting in a manner likely to endanger aircraft, individuals in aircraft, other individuals, or property. Article 94 of the 2016 order prohibited small unmanned aircraft over 400 feet above ground, but this only applied in cases where the aircraft had a mass of 7 kilograms.

=== Air Navigation Order (Amendment) 2018 ===
The Air Navigation Order (Amendment) 2018 amended the 2016 order, but did not replace it. The 2018 order established two separate categories of person:

- The "remote pilot" who is defined as remotely operating the aircraft's flight controls.
- The "SUA operator" who is defined as managing the aircraft.

The 2018 order extended the ban on small unmanned aircraft over 400 feet above ground under article 94 of the 2016 order to all small unmanned aircraft by the insertion of article 94A into the 2016 order.

=== Air Traffic Management and Unmanned Aircraft Act 2021 ===
On 20 February 2019, the Department for Transport announced legislation to extend the no-fly zone around airports, banning drones from flying within 5 kilometres (3.1 mi) of runways. The legislation was announced as a response to the 2018 drone incident at Gatwick Airport.

The act gives police the ability to require that an individual lands an unmanned aircraft and issue fixed penalty notices for certain offences. The act also gives police stop-and-search powers in situations where certain offences involving unmanned aircraft are committed.

The act places restrictions on unmanned aircraft near prisons and airports.

== Categories of Operations ==
=== Open Category (for low-risk, non-commercial flights) ===
Sub-category	Weight range	Requirements
A1 — Fly Over People	Less than 250 g	May be flown without specific permission from the CAA provided the pilot follows the manufacturer's operating instructions.
A2 — Fly Close to People	Between 250 g and 2 kg	Operators must complete the CAA's online theory test and comply with the relevant operational restrictions.
A3 — Fly Far from People	Over 2 kg but less than 25 kg	May only be operated in designated areas approved by the CAA, and require specific operational authorisation.

==== Key Rules for Open Category ====
- Maintain Visual Line of Sight (VLOS): The drone must be kept within the operator's direct line of sight during flight. The use of binoculars or visual aids is not permitted. A maximum horizontal range of 500 metres from the operator must be adhered to.
- Observe Altitude Limits: In order to prevent interference with manned aircraft, flights above 120 metres (400 feet) ground level are not permitted.
- Avoid Restricted Airspace: Stay clear of airports, airfields, and other controlled or restricted zones unless you have explicit permission.
- Fly Safely and Responsibly: Do not fly near people, animals, or vehicles in a way that could pose a risk. Flying within 50 metres of uninvolved people is not permitted, except during take off and landing, when the required distance is 30 metres.
- Register with the CAA: Drones over 250 g must be registered with the Civil Aviation Authority, and operators must obtain an Operator ID.
- Complete Required Online Training: If flying in the A2 or A3 subcategories, you must pass the Civil Aviation Authority's online theory test and obtain a flyer ID.
- Respect Privacy Laws: Be aware of and comply with privacy and data protection regulations when recording photos or videos in public or private spaces.

=== Specific Category (for higher-risk or commercial flights) ===
The specific category covers more complex UAVs operations that fall outside the standard limitations of the Open Category. These flights often involve drones weighing over 2 kg, or situations where restrictions of the A2 subcategory are too limiting. This category is for operators who intend to fly under the following conditions:

- Conducting flights over crowds or large gatherings.
- Dropping objects or spraying substances (such as for agricultural use).
- Operating heavier drones (weighing more than 500 g) in close proximity (less than 50 metres during flight or 30 metres during take off and landing) to people, including in residential or built-up areas.
- Flights exceeding 120 metres (400 feet) above ground level.
- Flights exceeding the maximum horizontal range of 500 metres from the operator.
- Flights outside of the visual line of sight of the operator.

Operating under this category requires specific authorisation from the Civil Aviation Authority, which sets out the precise conditions and safety requirements for each mission.

=== Certified Category (for the highest-risk drones) ===
The certified category is designated for drones used in commercial aviation. For example:

- Operating an unmanned aircraft with a span or dimension of 3 metres or more over crowds or large gatherings.
- Transporting people using an unmanned aircraft.
- Carrying dangerous goods that would pose a significant risk to third parties in the event of an accident.

Full certification and approval from the CAA is required to operate under this category.
