= List of unmanned aerial vehicle-related incidents =

Unmanned aerial vehicles (UAVs), or drones, have frequently been involved in military operations. Non-military UAVs have often been reported as causing hazards to aircraft, or to people or property on the ground. Safety concerns have been raised due to the potential for an ingested drone to rapidly disable an aircraft engine, and several near-misses and verified collisions have involved hobbyist drone operators flying in violation of aviation safety regulations.

UAVs have historically had a much higher loss rate than manned military aircraft. In addition to anti-aircraft weapons, UAVs are vulnerable to power and communications link losses.

== Notable military events involving UAVs ==
- In August 1956, several Northrop F-89 Scorpions attempted to shoot down a runaway Grumman F6F-5K drone in Southern California, failing to bring it down with rocket fire. It later crashed in a desert area.
- The Israeli IAI Scout drone was operated in combat missions by the South African Defence Force against Angola during Operation Protea in 1981.
- UAVs operated by the Israeli Air Force were instrumental during Operation Mole Cricket 19 in 1982. The IAI Scout and Tadiran Mastiff were used to identify SAM sites, while Samson decoy UAVs were used to activate and confuse Syrian radar.
- During the Gulf War, Iraqi Army forces surrendered to UAVs from the USS Wisconsin.
- A few days before the U.S. Senate vote on the Authorization for Use of Military Force Against Iraq Resolution in October 2002, about 75 senators were told in closed session that Saddam Hussein had the means of delivering biological and chemical weapons of mass destruction via UAVs that could be launched from ships off the Atlantic coast to attack U.S. eastern seaboard cities. Colin Powell suggested in his presentation to the United Nations that they had been transported out of Iraq and could be launched against the U.S. It was later revealed that Iraq's UAV fleet consisted of only a few outdated Czech training drones. At the time, there was a vigorous dispute within the intelligence community as to whether the CIA's conclusions about Iraqi UAVs were accurate. The U.S. Air Force, the agency most familiar with UAVs, denied outright that Iraq possessed any offensive UAV capability.
- The first targeted UAV killing outside a conventional battlefield by the U.S. took place in the Marib district of Yemen on 3 November 2002, when six alleged terrorists were killed in their SUV by a UAV-fired missile. The command centre was in Tampa, Florida.
- The first-ever dogfight involving a UAV occurred in December 2002 when an Iraqi MiG-25 and an American RQ-1 Predator fired missiles at each other. The MiG-25's missile destroyed the RQ-1.
- The U.S. deployed UAVs in Yemen to search for and kill Anwar al-Awlaki, an American and Yemeni imam, firing at and failing to kill him at least once before he was killed in a UAV-launched missile attack in Yemen on 30 September 2011. The targeted killing of an American citizen was seen as unprecedented, but nearly nine years earlier in 2002, U.S. citizen Kemal Darwish was one of six men killed in Yemen by the first UAV strike outside a war zone.
- In December 2011, Iran captured an American RQ-170 that flew over Iran and rejected President Barack Obama's request to return it to the U.S. Iranian officials claim to have recovered data from the U.S. surveillance aircraft. However, it is not clear how Iran brought it down. There have also been claims that Iran spoofed the GPS signal used by the UAV and hijacked it into landing on an Iranian runway.
- In November 2024, a series of unauthorized drone activities was detected over and near four U.S. Air Force bases in the United Kingdom.
- In late 2024, there were multiple UAV incursions over military airspace as part of the 2024 United States drone sightings.

== Civilian incidents with manned aircraft ==
=== Verified collisions ===
3 September 1990
A man operating a R/C plane buzzed and deliberately rammed a Goodyear Blimp, resulting in a 3-foot puncture in the envelope. The blimp landed safely despite the damage and the operator of the R/C aircraft was arrested.

21 September 2017
A civilian DJI Phantom 4 collided with a UH-60 Black Hawk helicopter in the evening over the eastern shore of Staten Island, New York City, United States. The helicopter was one of two with the 82nd Airborne Division flying out of Fort Bragg on duty for the United Nations General Assembly. The helicopters were able to continue flying and landed at Linden Airport. Nobody was hurt, but part of the UAV was found at the bottom of the main rotor system. In December 2017, the National Transportation Safety Board issued an accident report into the collision, finding the pilot of the UAV at fault. The UAV operator deliberately flew the UAV 2.5 miles away from himself and was unaware of the helicopters' presence. The operator did not know of the collision until contacted by the NTSB and when interviewed by them showed only a general cursory awareness of the regulations. There was also a temporary flight restriction in place, from which the Black Hawk (but not the UAV) was exempt. UAVs are prohibited from flying beyond the pilot's line of sight under FAA regulations.

12 October 2017
A Beechcraft King Air A100 of Skyjet Aviation collided with a UAV as the former was approaching Jean Lesage Airport near Quebec City, Canada. The aircraft landed safely despite its wing being hit. The aircraft had flown from Rouyn-Noranda Airport to Jean Lesage Airport with six passengers and two crew. A spokeswoman for the Quebec City Police said that neither the UAV nor the operator had been found. It had been flying at 1,500 feet—five times the maximum altitude that UAVs are permitted to fly in Canada. Regulations banning the flying of UAVs near airports had been introduced earlier in 2017. Minister of Transport Marc Garneau released a statement saying "Although the vast majority of drone operators fly responsibly, it was our concern for incidents like this that prompted me to take action and issue interim safety measures restricting where recreational drones could be flown. I would like to remind drone operators that endangering the safety of an aircraft is extremely dangerous and a serious offence."

4 June 2018
An Aérospatiale AS350BA helicopter, (N611TC) collided with a DJI Mavic 2 Zoom during an off-road truck race near Johnson Valley, California. The helicopter landed without incident and suffered significant damage which required the aircraft to be grounded and hauled off on a trailer. The drone operator was hired to fly the event and was flying the sUAS Beyond Visual Line of Sight at the time of the crash. He had not attended the air safety briefing. The drone struck the helicopter's tail rotor, causing it to fail. The pilot was able to land safely with no injuries. Both the helicopter and UAS were part of the aerial assests of the race teams chasing the off-road vehicles. A lack of coordination / communication lead to the collision. Video of the crash and the resulting damage provides documentation of the event.

10 August 2018
In the first-ever recorded mid-air collision between a UAV and a hot air balloon, the balloon, carrying a certified pilot and two passengers, was struck by a DJI Mavic Pro while flying near the Teton County Fairgrounds in Driggs, Idaho, United States. The drone was destroyed after its rotors were sheared off on contact with the balloon's envelope and load lines, and fell to earth; the balloon suffered no significant damage and landed safely with no injuries to the pilot or passengers. The inexperienced hobbyist drone operator reportedly lost sight of the balloon in the aircraft's monitor and was operating within 5 miles (8 km) of Driggs–Reed Memorial Airport without notifying air traffic control, a violation of Federal Aviation Regulations; the balloon pilot had relied on radio communication with nearby manned aircraft and air traffic control to avoid other air traffic. The balloon pilot chose to report the incident to the National Transportation Safety Board in lieu of notifying the local sheriff's department, stating that she hoped "this incident helps create a conversation of respect for nature, the airspace, and rules and regulations." The incident is currently under investigation.

10 August 2021
A Cessna 172 of Canadian Flyers International Inc. registered as C-GKWL collided with a DJI Matrice 210 operated by the York Regional Police while on approach to Buttonville Municipal Airport. The Cessna landed without incident and suffered major damage, including a bent airbox, a damaged engine cowling, and a propeller strike.

7 July 2025
A Texas Army National Guard Blackhawk collided with a DJI Mavic 3 Enterprise operated by a Texas Ranger while assisting with the Kerrville, Texas flash flood search and recovery effort. The Blackhawk landed without incident and suffered nearly no damage but was out of service for 2 hours for inspection. City of Kerrville authorities initially blamed the collision on a private drone; they had laid claim that the drone was a private drone operating illegally in a Temporary Flight Restricted area. The drone was cleared for flight within the TFR and being operated by a Texas Department of Public Safety Highway Patrol officer performing a mapping mission as aid to the flood emergency effort.

=== Alleged collisions ===
17 April 2016
The pilot of British Airways flight BA727 reported a collision with a UAV to Metropolitan Police. The Airbus A320 was approaching Heathrow Airport when the collision happened. None of the 132 passengers or 5 crew were injured. After an inspection by engineers, the aircraft was cleared to take off for its next flight. Members of the British government, as well as the Labour Party and BALPA, called for urgent action, including a register of drone users and geo-fencing of airports. In late April 2016, Transport Secretary Patrick McLoughlin told MPs that experts believed that the incident was not related to UAVs. There was no damage to the aircraft and it unclear whether a plastic bag or a UAV was to blame. An investigation by the Air Accidents Investigation Branch had been closed due to a lack of evidence. Police had searched a "wide area" of Richmond and found nothing.

13 December 2018
The crew of an Aeroméxico Boeing 737-800 operating as Flight 773 heard a "pretty loud bang" on approach to Tijuana International Airport, and after a safe landing, the nose of the aircraft was found to be damaged. The airline has not positively determined the cause, but the incident is being investigated as a drone strike.

=== Near-misses ===
==== Austria ====
- In August 2016, a rescue helicopter carrying a car crash victim to Klagenfurt Hospital had to take evasive action when a UAV flew within metres of it. Local police were unable to determine the identity of the UAV's pilot.

==== Canada ====
- In March 2014, a remote-controlled helicopter was reported by the crew of a Boeing 777 flying 30 metres (98 ft) from their craft at Vancouver International Airport.
- Video taken from a UAV's onboard camera in April 2014 showed the UAV flying close to an airliner as it landed at the same airport. A Transport Canada spokesman said his department and the RCMP were investigating.
- Edmonton police helicopter Air 1 was responding to a call downtown in July 2016 when the pilot saw a white quadcopter with red lights approaching. A flight crew member said that a collision "could have been catastrophic and potentially fatal for both crew members of Air 1". Transport Canada had been made aware of the incident, and Edmonton Police Service said there was a criminal investigation into the events, as well as possible charges under the Aeronautics Act.

==== China ====
In January 2017, a 23-year-old UAV pilot from Xiaoshan was detained because of footage taken from a drone flying near airliners descending to land at Hangzhou Xiaoshan International Airport. The incident came to light when footage was uploaded to QQ. The footage in question was an eight-second clip from a ten-minute recording taken from an altitude of 450 metres (1,480 ft). The pilot had flown the UAV to photograph a sunset, but had also recorded several airliners flying past. The model used was a DJI Mavic, with the manufacturer strongly condemning the incident.

==== France ====
- A UAV came within 5 metres (16 ft) of an Air France A320 flight from Barcelona to Charles de Gaulle Airport in February 2016. The aircraft was at an altitude of 1,600 metres (5,200 ft) when the pilot saw the UAV to the plane's port, disengaged the autopilot, and took evasive action and flew over the plane to avoid the crash. The Bureau d'Enquêtes et d'Analyses pour la Sécurité de l'Aviation Civile has initiated the first French inquiry into a near miss involving a UAV.

==== New Zealand ====
- A UAV came within 5 metres (16 ft) of an Air New Zealand Boeing 777-200 on final approach to Auckland Airport on 25 March 2018. The pilots spotted the UAV as the aircraft was at a point in its descent where it was not possible to take evasive action, and they initially feared it would be sucked into an engine. Flight NZ92, which flew from Tokyo to Auckland, was ultimately unharmed. The identity of the UAV pilot is unknown. Air New Zealand called for tougher laws to prevent the reckless use of UAVs near airports and prison terms for operators who endanger lives. As of the event, UAV pilots who breach civil aviation rules can be fined up to NZ$5000.

==== Poland ====
- A Lufthansa plane landing at Warsaw Chopin Airport nearly collided with a drone on 21 July 2015. The drone came within 100 metres (330 ft) of the plane, at an altitude of 760 metres (2,490 ft) and a distance of 5 km (3.1 mi) from the airport near Piaseczno.

==== United Kingdom ====
- It was reported that a UAV had flown within 25 metres (82 ft) of an ATR 72 passenger airliner on 30 May 2014. The aircraft was approaching London Southend Airport and about to intercept the ILS glide slope when the co-pilot reported seeing a small craft flying about 100 m to the right of the aircraft. The co-pilot and Air Traffic Controller agreed it was probably a quadcopter, as it was seen flying as close as 25 metres to the aircraft. Southend ATC failed to detect the craft on radar; subsequent examination of radar from other sites produced several brief but inconclusive radar signals. Police were contacted, but the pilot of the UAV could not be found.
- Investigators confirmed that they were investigating claims that a UAV came about 20 feet of an Airbus A320 landing at Heathrow on 22 July 2014. The A320 was 700 feet from landing when the craft passed 20 feet over the left wing of the aircraft. Despite an investigation and the cooperation of radio-controlled aircraft club members, the operator of the aircraft could not be identified. The incident was given an A rating, meaning that there had been a serious risk of collision.
- A Westland Lynx flying over Hambrook in April 2015 had to take evasive action to avoid a UAV that flew one rotor span from the side of the helicopter.
- An autogyro flying over Detling, Kent in June 2015 encountered a UAV at an altitude of 450 metres (1,480 ft). The UAV was 20 metres (66 ft) from the autogyro, and the autogyro's pilot considered the risk of collision high.
- One month later, both crew members of an Avro RJ1 saw a UAV at an altitude of 1,200 metres (3,900 ft) over Detling. As it would not be visible from the ground, the United Kingdom Airprox Board concluded that it was impossible for it to be flown legally under those circumstances. The same month, a Beechcraft BE200 was approaching Southampton Airport when a UAV passed within two wing lengths of it. According to investigators, chance played a large role in the vehicles not colliding. Also in July 2015, a Dornier 328 was on final approach to Manchester Airport at 850m when a blue UAV was spotted. Investigators concluded that the UAV was not permitted to be in that airspace.
- A Boeing 737 had a near miss shortly after takeoff from London Stansted Airport in September 2015, having left the pilot with no time to react. The same month, a UAV came within 20 metres (66 ft) of an Embraer 170 over the Houses of Parliament as the latter was on approach to London City Airport. Shortly after a Boeing 777 had taken off from Heathrow Airport that month, a UAV passed within 25 metres (82 ft) of the jet at the same height. In another incident, an Airbus A319 was landing at Heathrow Airport at 150 metres (490 ft) when a UAV was seen about 23 metres (75 ft) to the left and 6 metres (20 ft) above the airliner.
- In October 2015, a Dornier 328 was taking off from Manchester Airport when a UAV passed 15m from the left wing tip when the latter was at 900m, leading the pilot to conclude there was a high risk of collision. A Piper PA-28 Cherokee was flying near Otherton Airfield in Staffordshire when a UAV passed about 6 metres (20 ft) from its wing tip.
- In August 2016, an East Anglian Air Ambulance Eurocopter EC145 narrowly avoided a collision with a UAV over north London at 7:45 PM on August 26. The UAV passed within 30 metres (98 ft) of the air ambulance and was seen by the crew. Investigators found there was a high risk of the helicopter and UAV coming into contact, endangering the helicopter. The UAV was also being operated over a built-up area without Civil Aerial Authority permission and the incident was classed in category A, the highest risk category. Prince William regularly flies the helicopter, but was not on duty at the time of the incident.
- An EasyJet aircraft landing at Edinburgh Airport in November 2016 narrowly avoided colliding with a UAV flying at the same altitude by 23 metres (75 ft). The Airprox Board said a collision had only been avoided "by providence".
- A Loganair flight descending into Edinburgh Airport in May 2017 had to take evasive action when the crew saw a UAV about 20 to 30 metres (66 to 98 ft) from the aircraft at an altitude of 4,000 feet. The flight from Shetland landed safely. Police believe the UAV was operated from Bathgate or Armadale.
- On 9 July 2017, an Airbus A319 was preparing to land when a UAV appeared and flew over the aircraft's starboard wing. The UAV was initially thought to be a bird, appearing as a small dark object due to twilight conditions at 20:35 BST. At the closest point of approach, the drone appeared between the wing tip and fuselage, above the starboard wing. The aircraft landed safely and Gatwick Airport police became involved. A UK Airprox Board report into the incident said there was a high risk of collision and that "A larger aircraft might not have missed it and in the captain's opinion, it had put 130 lives at risk". The report also said the UAV was "very large, certainly not a toy", had four blades, and estimated that the drone was about one metre across. The report said that the estimated distance and pilots' inability to avoid the UAV "portrayed a situation where providence had played a major part" in avoiding an accident. Former pilot Stephen Landells said it was a "worrying near-miss that could have ended in tragedy". Landells also said that BALPA wanted to see details of proposed legislation for drone registration and a timeline for said registration.

=== United States ===
- An Alitalia pilot on final approach to runway 31 at John F. Kennedy International Airport reported seeing a small UAV near his aircraft in March 2013. Both the FAA and FBI were reported to be investigating.
- US Airways Flight 4650 nearly collided with a drone while landing at Tallahassee Regional Airport on 22 March 2014. The plane, a Bombardier CRJ200, was at an altitude of 2,300 feet (700 m) when it came dangerously close to the drone, described by one of the pilots "as a camouflaged F-4 fixed-wing aircraft that was quite small". Jim Williams, head of the UAV office at the Federal Aviation Administration, said: "The risk for a small [drone] to be ingested into a passenger airline engine is very real." The Federal Bureau of Investigation was investigating the incident, which was the first known instance of a large airliner nearly colliding with a drone in the U.S. However, the authenticity of this report is under dispute.
- A California Highway Patrol helicopter in Martinez, California was working with local police when they spotted the lights of a UAV on 5 December 2015. They were both flying between 700 and 800 feet (210 and 240 m). The helicopter banked to evade the UAV, but the UAV passed by it. The helicopter followed the UAV to where it landed and called local police to find the operator. The CHP asked UAV operators to be careful about flying. The incident has been passed to the Federal Aviation Administration for investigation. According to the operator of the UAV, it was flying on autopilot because of a lost radio signal. The operator was cooperating with FAA, police, and Caltrans and has offered an apology to the helicopter pilot.
- In March 2016, a Lufthansa Airbus A380 reported a near miss as it approached Los Angeles International Airport. The airliner was at an elevation of 5,000 feet (1,500 m) and about 14 miles (20 km) east of the airport when the UAV flew 200 feet (61 m) over it. Police searched for the UAV pilot, though they admitted the search would be difficult.
- A video posted to YouTube in featured footage filmed by a drone hovering above an approaching Frontier Airlines Airbus A320 in 2018. The airport was identified as McCarran International Airport, and the UAV may have taken off from a parking lot near Whitney Mesa Nature Preserve to the east of the airport. Both The Academy of Model Aeronautics and Association for Unmanned Vehicle Systems International condemned the video. The Federal Aviation Administration is investigating the incident.
- Canadair CL-415 deployed during the Palisades Fire experienced a drone strike while performing aerial firefighting operations. The aircraft sustained damage to the wing, and was taken out of service for 5 days to be repaired.

== Other civilian accidents and incidents ==
=== Australia ===
- A UAV crash landed onto train tracks on the Sydney Harbour Bridge, where it was found and retrieved by a Sydney Trains conductor in October 2013. Confused platform workers inspected the UAV, with concern that it may have been a weapon. The Civil Aviation Safety Authority (CASA) started an investigation, and the police began searching for the pilot. The pilot was testing new UAV equipment when the camera mounting failed in mid-flight, and the UAV began to return to its GPS starting point. The UAV collided with the corner of a building and then a Sydney Harbour Bridge pylon, and the pilot presumed it to have been lost to the waters of Port Jackson. After seeing media stories of a "mystery drone" colliding with the nearby bridge, the pilot contacted aviation authorities and Sydney police. The police found the situation to be unsuspicious and returned the craft to the pilot.
- A triathlete was injured in an incident involving a drone that was filming a race in April 2014. She claimed that the drone collided with her and that "the ambulance crew took a piece of propeller from my head". The owner of the UAV claimed that the athlete had been injured when she was frightened by the falling UAV and tripped. Timing equipment caused interference with the operation of the UAV while it was close to people on the ground. In November 2014, the Commonwealth Director of Public Prosecutions stated that the evidence showed that the drone had crashed into the triathlete, who sustained head injuries as a result. However, taking into account the young age and antecedents of the pilot, the Commonwealth Director of Public Prosecutions chose not to proceed with a charge against the operator and handed the matter back to CASA. CASA subsequently fined the operator $1,700 for flying the drone within 30 metres of people.
- A recreational drone pilot crashed their drone, a DJI Phantom, during a ceremony at the Australian War Memorial in Canberra in February 2016. No one was injured. The drone reportedly landed near the Memorial's Director and former defence minister Brendan Nelson, who picked it up and subsequently handed it to security staff. Following a Civil Aviation Safety Authority (CASA) investigation, the pilot was fined $900, which, according to a CASA spokesman, closed the matter.

=== Canada ===
- Stephanie Creignou was attending a 5K run in Beloeil, Quebec in June 2016 when a DJI Phantom 3 fell and hit her on the head. She was taken to hospital, where she was diagnosed with whiplash. As of 22 June, she was still out of work and had to cancel a holiday with her husband. Rosaire Turcotte, who operated the UAV that crashed, said he could not understand how it happened and that he had acted safely. The incident was caught by a camera on a different UAV, one owned by VTOL-X Drones, a company hired to cover the event. VTOL-X CEO Flavio Martenkowski said he had spoken to Turcotte about the danger of flying so near to a crowd just before the crash. The Transportation Safety Board of Canada opened an investigation into the crash.

=== France ===
- Unidentified UAVs were seen flying near 13 nuclear power plants in October and November 2014. The Secretariat-General for National Defence and Security issued a statement that the flights were an "organized provocation".
- A UAV with a wingspan of 3 metres (9.8 ft) went out of control and was pursued by two Belgian F-16 fighter aircraft in March 2016. When it flew into French airspace, it was pursued by French Rafale fighters for two hours until it crashed in a field near Dizy-le-Gros. It had been built by the Flemish Institute for Technological Research and had taken off from Weelde Air Base.

=== India ===
- Francescos' Pizza of Mumbai made a test delivery from a branch in Lower Parel to the roof of a building in Worli in May 2014. Police in Mumbai began an investigation on the grounds that security clearances had not been sought.

=== Ireland ===
- A theatre group flew Parrot AR.Drones in Dublin to film video for an exhibit in 2012. The Irish Aviation Authority stated that this was prohibited, as Dublin is classed as a restricted area.
- A video of Cork taken by Raymond Fogarty became popular online in April 2014, but was criticised by licensed operators SkyTec. Fogarty later became a commercial UAV pilot and urged UAV operators to be aware of laws and avoid flying over built-up areas.

=== Italy ===
- In December 2015, a UAV filming a slalom event in Madonna di Campiglio nearly hit Marcel Hirscher. The International Ski Federation had agreed to the use of the UAV, though the pilot was not allowed to fly directly over the race course. The race director said that the pilot had not followed the federation's instructions. Camera UAVs have since been banned from the Federation's World Cup races.

=== South Africa ===
- A UAV hit and broke an office window in Cape Town and collided with David Perel, an interface designer and racing driver for Kessel Ferrari, in April 2016. The pilot and a friend went to check that he had not been injured, and Perel returned the UAV. The SACAA contacted both Perel and the pilot after video of the incident appeared on YouTube.

=== United Kingdom ===
- A man pled guilty to flying a small UAV within 50 m of a submarine testing facility in April 2014. He claimed that he had been flying a mile from the base but had lost radio contact with the craft. He was fined £800 and ordered to pay legal costs of £3,500. The CAA claimed that the case raised safety issues related to flying unmanned aircraft.
- In September 2015, Nigel Wilson, of Bingham, Nottinghamshire, admitted nine breaches of the Air Navigation Order dating back to the previous year. He was fined £1,800 and banned from buying or using a UAV for two years.
- It was reported that a toddler had lost an eye as a result of an accident with a UAV in November 2015. Simon Evans flew the UAV, which accidentally struck a tree and started spinning before it struck 18-month-old Oscar Webb. Oscar can see out of his uninjured eye, but will require several operations before a prosthetic eye can be fitted. Oscar's family forgave Evans, but he has not flown any of his UAVs since, stating: "I look at the drones in the garage and I feel physically sick."
- Lincolnshire Police asked the operator of a UAV to come forward after footage taken by it flying over Lincoln appeared on YouTube in December 2015. The flight was criticised by an expert as "incredibly irresponsible".
- In March 2016, BALPA called for tests to determine the possible outcomes of UAVs colliding with passenger aircraft. That same month, a UAV collided with a train hauled by the Flying Scotsman steam locomotive. British Transport Police opened an investigation, having identified the operator, and warned UAV operators not to fly within 50 metres of a train, as it is illegal.
- Daniel Kelly, from Grove Park, Lewisham, London pled guilty to using a UAV to send a psychoactive substance and tobacco into HMP Swaleside. He was arrested on 25 April 2016 in Leysdown-on-Sea. Police had spotted a vehicle with its lights on before someone ran to it and it sped off. A UAV was found in the boot of the car—it had been sprayed with black paint, and black tape had been put over the lights. Kent Police said it was probably the first UK conviction of its type. Kelly's girlfriend was cleared of the same charges. He had also flown over HMP Elmley, HMP Wandsworth and HMP The Mount.
- On 3 July 2017, Gatwick Airport closed its runway because of a UAV flying nearby. The runway was closed for one period of nine minutes, then another of five minutes. EasyJet said four of its flights were diverted and British Airways said one of its flights had been diverted to Bournemouth. Sussex police began an investigation.
- A suspected UAV of "industrial specifications" caused major air traffic disruption for over 100,000 passengers on 700 flights at Gatwick Airport during the busy Christmas period in December 2018. Repeated reported sightings of a UAV over the runway caused a suspension of all takeoffs and landings starting at 9:03 PM on 19 December. Each time Gatwick prepared to reopen its runway, further reported sightings forced its closure. The disruption continued for approximately 45 hours, with the last reported sighting of a UAV occurring at 5:10pm on 21 December. Two people were arrested in connection with the incident, but were released without charge. Despite an 18-month investigation and a £50,000 reward for information, no culprit or evidence of drone use was ever found. There are no known photographs, videos, or official descriptions of the alleged UAV, leading a number of experts to suggest that there was no UAV involved in the disruption.
- On 8 January 2019, flights were suspended at Heathrow Airport after a drone sighting was reported.
- The Premier League game between Brentford and Wolverhampton Wanderers on 22 January 2022 was halted for 20 minutes by a drone flying over the pitch at the Community Stadium.
- On 2nd August 2025 a police DJI Matrice 30 was responding to an incident on the Isle of Sheppey when it hit overhead cables and subsequently crashed seriously injuring a child. The Independent Office for Police Conduct (IOPC) confirmed this was the first time it had ever investigated a civilian being injured by a police drone, and that its inquiry continues.

In a statement, the IOPC said: "We can confirm we are independently investigating an incident where a child was hurt by a drone which crashed while being flown by Kent Police". The watchdog added: "As part of the ongoing investigation we have served a misconduct notice on a special inspector. The serving of a notice does not necessarily mean disciplinary proceedings will follow." https://www.bbc.co.uk/news/articles/cn7e1ezrz45o

=== United States ===
- A UAV filming events at the Virginia Bull Run in Dinwiddie County, Virginia crashed into the crowd in August 2013, causing minor injuries.
- Police were called to Hammonasset Beach State Park, Madison, Connecticut by Andrea Mears in May 2014, who claimed that Austin Haughwout had been filming people at a beach with his UAV and that he had assaulted her. The police prepared to arrest him, but he produced recordings from his UAV and mobile phone which showed that he had not been filming people and that Mears had assaulted him instead. Mears was arrested and charged with assault in the third degree and breach of peace in the second degree. She was granted accelerated probation, which erases her conviction from her record after two years.
- Ice hockey fans were celebrating a victory outside the Staples Center in June 2014 when a UAV was seen flying over the crowd. The crowd threw objects at the UAV, bringing it close enough to the ground for members of the crowd to grab it. Claims were made that the UAV belonged to the Los Angeles Police Department, but the LAPD denied this.
- A DJI Phantom crashed in the grounds of the White House, Washington, D.C., in January 2015. The operator had flown it while drunk and lost control of it.
- A woman watching the Seattle Pride parade in June 2015 was hit by a falling UAV and knocked unconscious, suffering a concussion. She was standing near Fourth Avenue and Madison Street when the drone collided with a building, fell, and struck her on the head. Her boyfriend caught her when she fell and an off-duty firefighter helped. The pilot came forward after a police investigation. In January 2017, Paul M. Skinner was found guilty of reckless endangerment by a six-person jury in a unanimous verdict before Judge Willie Gregory. It was the first time the Seattle Public Attorneys' office had convicted anyone of mishandling a drone in a public place. Such a conviction can carry a penalty of up to 364 days in jail and a $5000 fine. Skinner was sentenced to 30 days in prison and ordered to pay a $500 fine.
- In July 2015, firefighting aircraft were grounded for 26 minutes in Southern California because of fears of collisions with five UAVs that had been seen in the area. It was the fourth time in as many weeks that drones had interfered with firefighters in Southern California.
- A police search in east Hollywood in August 2015 was interrupted by a UAV. Police had been searching for a man wanted for assault with a deadly weapon when a UAV flew near a Los Angeles Police Department helicopter. In November 2015, Martin Sheldon pled no contest to obstructing a police officer on 27 August 2015 when he flew his UAV near the helicopter. He had to surrender his UAV to police, complete 30 days of community labour, and promise not to own or fly a UAV or other unmanned aircraft during his three years of probation.
- In September 2015, a UAV crashed into empty seating at the US Open at Louis Armstrong Stadium in Queens, New York, causing no injuries according to the USTA. It happened during a match between Flavia Pennetta and Monica Niculescu. A teacher named Daniel Verley was arrested on charges of reckless endangerment, reckless operation of a UAV, and operating a UAV outside of a prescribed area in a New York city park. He was released and ordered to attend court at a later date. It is expressly forbidden to bring UAVs onto the grounds of the National Tennis Center. Verley cooperated fully with the investigation, and in October 2015 was sentenced to community service, involving tutoring disenfranchised students.
- A drone flying near the Space Needle in Seattle, Washington collided with the tower in December 2016 while pyrotechnicians were setting up fireworks for the New Year.
- A UAV filming the Golden State Race Series in California in May 2017 collided with a tree and spun out of control into a group of cyclists. Part of the drone became lodged in the front wheel of a cyclist, causing him to flip over his handlebars and suffer abrasions. The drone pilot reportedly offered to buy the cyclist a new front wheel and helmet. The same month, a track and field meeting at Trabuco Hills High School, Mission Viejo, California was targeted by a drone dropping water balloons on the event, though only one person was hit. The drone had been spotted the previous evening, and the coach had sent people out to find the pilot. Police were notified the following morning.
- A GoPro Karma quadcopter hit a seat at Petco Park in San Diego, California, narrowly missing fans during a match between the San Diego Padres and the Arizona Diamondbacks in May 2017. Major League Baseball subsequently stated that UAVs are not allowed at baseball grounds.
- A 52-year-old woman saw a UAV flying outside the 42nd floor of a condominium tower in the 500 block of North Lake Shore Drive, Chicago at around 12:30 pm on 9 September 2017. According to police, it hovered for a long time near the building, without the consent of building management. Amit Kleiman, aged 31, attempted to retrieve the UAV from the third floor and was taken into custody. He was charged with one count each of criminal trespass, reckless conduct, and breach of peace.
- From December 2019 through January 2020, a large group of unidentified drones was repeatedly observed in Colorado and Nebraska flying in grid formations at night. The drones were apparently being operated in violation of federal regulations, prompting investigations by the FAA and the state of Colorado.
- A man was arrested on federal charges in Portland, Oregon for flying a drone in restricted air space during a protest in July 2020.
- In late 2024, there were reports of large unidentified drones appearing during nighttime hours in multiple New Jersey counties and parts of New York City.

== See also ==
- Unmanned aerial vehicles in the United States military
- Unmanned aerial vehicle programs of the Central Intelligence Agency
