= 2024 drone sightings =

In late 2024, a series of unauthorized drone incursions were reported near military installations in the United States, the United Kingdom, and Germany, raising security concerns among defense officials. The incidents involved unidentified drones operating over or near sensitive sites, including US Air Force bases and defense-related industrial facilities. Military and law enforcement agencies in multiple countries launched investigations, deploying counter-drone measures and increasing security in response.

== Europe ==
=== United Kingdom ===
Between 20 and 26 November 2024, a series of unauthorized drone activities was reported over and near four US Air Force bases in the United Kingdom: RAF Lakenheath, RAF Mildenhall, RAF Feltwell, and RAF Fairford. These installations, located in Suffolk, Norfolk, and Gloucestershire, are critical to US military operations in Europe. The drone activity persisted for several days, raising concerns about the coordination and intent behind the incursions. Residents of Beck Row, Suffolk, located next to an RAF base, also reported drone sightings. About sixty British combat troops were deployed to help to defend US bases against drones.

==== Incidents ====
During the incursions, multiple small unmanned aerial vehicles (drones) were observed entering restricted airspace. The drones varied in both number and type.

The incursions prompted joint monitoring and countermeasures by US and UK military personnel. British troops were deployed to assist in tracking and identifying the drone operators, using counter-drone systems such as ORCUS. The incursions also led to disruptions in flight operations, with F-15E Strike Eagles launched from RAF Lakenheath to investigate.

Authorities encountered difficulties in identifying the drone operators, raising concerns about potential espionage or hostile surveillance. The incursions heightened worries about the security of critical military infrastructure. Investigations are ongoing, and both the operators and their intentions remain unknown.

According to The New York Times, military analysts have concluded that the reported drones may have been on a surveillance mission for a state actor.

==== Air bases affected ====
RAF Mildenhall supports refuelling and special operations, while RAF Feltwell provides logistical support for US forces.

RAF Lakenheath hosts the US Air Force's 48th Fighter Wing, operating F-15E Strike Eagles and F-35A Lightning II aircraft. In February 2024 US Department of Defense documents indicated RAF Lakenheath's facilities would be prepared to house nuclear weapons for an "upcoming nuclear mission".

RAF Fairford hosts a Lockheed U-2S Dragon Lady detachment from the 99th Reconnaissance Squadron and is the US Air Force's only European airfield for heavy bombers. It routinely supports Bomber Task Force (BTF) operations.

=== Germany ===
In August 2024, there were some reports of unidentified drones around US bases; at the time this was not the major news item that it later became in December 2024. One drone was reported to have traveled at 100 miles per hour. Various German officials began investigations. German news outlets reported some drone sightings over a chemical park in Brunsbuettel. One NATO air base raised its alert level due to drones.

In summer 2024, the prosecutor's office in Flensburg began investigating possible threats of espionage due to concerns about drones. German authorities began an official investigation into overflights by unknown drones, at sensitive sites.

The US military confirmed increased sightings around bases in Germany in December 2024. This included Ramstein Air Base. These sightings were reported in the newsmagazine Der Spiegel, as well as various US and UK news publications. Sightings were also reported around industrial facilities owned by Rheinmetall, a manufacturer of various weapons. This was discussed at an official conference by interior ministers from German states.

== North America ==
=== United States ===
In late 2024, widespread reports of drones emerged across the United States. From November to December, thousands of witnesses described seeing drones—also known as unmanned aerial vehicles—flying at night. The sightings began in New Jersey and subsequently spread to neighboring states, including New York and Pennsylvania. Reports soon emerged across the Northeast and other parts of the country. While investigators determined the reports mainly consisted of authorized drones and misidentified objects, military officials confirmed a concurrent pattern of unauthorized incursions over sensitive defense installations.

Sightings were reported over military installations, such as Picatinny Arsenal and Naval Weapons Station Earle in New Jersey, as well as civilian infrastructure and residential areas. Prominent reports included drones preventing a medical evacuation, following a Coast Guard vessel, and spraying "gray mist". These specific incidents were found to be commercial aircraft or atmospheric phenomena. Other purported drones were debunked as the constellation Orion or the planet Venus.

Federal investigators examined over 5,000 reports but found no evidence of threats or anomalous activity. A joint statement by the Department of Defense (DoD), Department of Homeland Security (DHS), Federal Aviation Administration (FAA), and Federal Bureau of Investigation (FBI) concluded most sightings were authorized drones, misidentified manned aircraft, and other routine objects. Independent experts agreed, with some describing the event as a mass panic, comparable to earlier episodes in American history. Others cited factors such as confirmation bias or social contagion as contributing to the wave of reports. DoD officials stated that unauthorized drones regularly flew over military bases and were usually harmless. Despite this, some analysts and officials suspected certain sightings were of foreign surveillance drones due to their appearance and behavior.

== Possible causes ==
=== China ===
Some US legislators have speculated that China was responsible for the drone activity.

=== Russia ===
An investigation into the UK drone incursions by The i Paper concluded suspected Russian links. The investigation was based on Open-source intelligence linking suspected GRU (Russian Federation) affiliated operatives working under cover as seasonal fruit pickers in the vicinity of the UK military installations.

=== Mass hysteria and mistaken identity ===
Missy Cummings an academic and retired military pilot stated the sightings were likely to be misidentified aircraft, stars and other light sources such as towers. Robert Bartholomew, an expert in mass panics, compared the supposed drone wave to previous UFO hysterias involving supposed foreign surveillance of military installations, such as the mystery airship phenomenon and allegations of German air-raids on North America during World War I. It was confirmed by the FAA in January 2025 that all of the drones flying over the northeast US were FAA research drones.

== See also ==
- 2019–20 Colorado drone sightings
- Unidentified Anomalous Phenomenon/Unidentified Flying Object
- All-domain Anomaly Resolution Office
- List of unmanned aerial vehicle-related incidents
- Russian sabotage in Europe
