= Jamey Jacob =

American engineering professor and innovator

- Education: University of Oklahoma
- Occupation: Aerospace engineer

Jamey D. Jacob is an American scientist and engineer who holds the Williams Chair and is a Regents Professor in Mechanical and Aerospace Engineering at Oklahoma State University (OSU) and serves as executive director of the Oklahoma Aerospace Institute for Research and Education and various other rulemaking and advisory committees. As of 2023, he is a member of the Federal Aviation Administration's Human Space Flight Occupant Safety Aerospace Rulemaking Committee. Jacob researches advanced air mobility and unmanned aerial vehicles.

Jacob graduated from the University of Oklahoma where he studied aerospace engineering and received a Ph.D. in mechanical engineering from the University of California, Berkeley. He is a past recipient of the Governor of Kentucky's Award for Research Excellence. In 2010, Jacob was named Oklahoma Innovator of the Year by The Journal Record — along with the Oklahoma City architectural firm of Elliott + Associates — for supporting the design of vertical axis wind turbines to increase the energy efficiency of skyscrapers. In 2022 he was named Executive Director of the Oklahoma Aerospace Institute for Research and Education as well as director for the Counter-UAS Center of Excellence.
