= University of Maryland Observatory =

Astronomical Observatory

- Interactive map of the University of Maryland Observatory area

General information
- Status: No longer used for professional research due to light pollution of DC Metro area
- Type: Astronomical Teaching
- Location: Metzerott Road between Adelphi Road and University Blvd; University of Maryland, College Park campus
- Completed: 1963

Website
- www.astro.umd.edu/openhouse/

University of Maryland Observatory is an astronomical observatory owned and operated by the University of Maryland, College Park. It is located in College Park, Maryland, USA. The Observatory hosts free open houses for the public twice a month, where visitors receive a lecture and access to three of the Observatory's telescopes. The open houses begin at 9 PM from May to October, and at 8 PM from November to April. The Washington Post named the Observatory open houses one of its seven favorite weekend excursions to do in the Washington metropolitan area in 2009.

University of Maryland Observatory
- Location(s): Maryland
- Coordinates: 39.00167°N 76.95667°W
- Altitude: 53 m (174 ft)
- Telescope style: Astronomical Teaching telescopes
- Website: www.astro.umd.edu/openhouse/
- Location of University of Maryland Observatory
- NASA Refractor: 8 inch refractor
- Astro-Physics Refractor: 7 inch refractor
- Celestron Reflector: 14 inch Schmidt-Cassegrain reflector
- Eichner Reflector: 20 inch Bent Cassegrain reflector

== See also ==
- List of observatories
