= Gatwick Airport drone incident =

Aviation incident in England, 2018

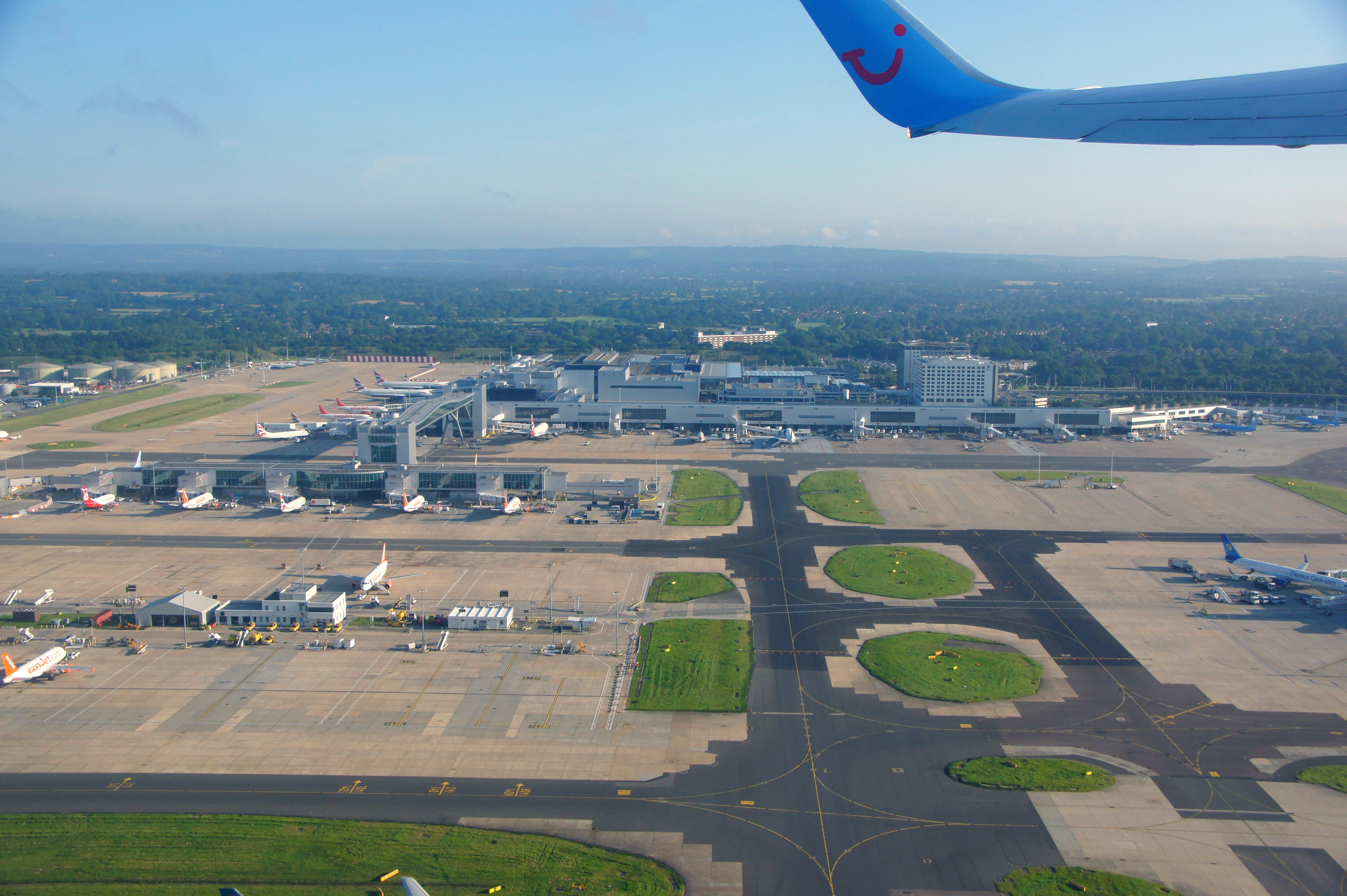
- Gatwick Airport in 2012
- Date: 19–21 December 2018
- Location: Gatwick Airport, West Sussex, England; 51°08′53″N 000°11′25″W
- Cause: Reports of drone activity within 1 km (0.62 mi) of the airport boundary
- Outcome: ~140,000 passengers affected ~1,000 flights diverted/cancelled
- Arrests: 2; both suspects released without charge

Between 19 and 21 December 2018, hundreds of flights were cancelled at Gatwick Airport near London, England, following reports of drone sightings close to the runway. With 140,000 passengers and 1,000 flights affected, it was the biggest disruption at Gatwick since its closure following the 2010 volcano eruptions in Iceland.

On 21 December, Sussex Police arrested two people who lived near the airport. They were cleared of any involvement and released without charge two days later, and later awarded compensation for wrongful arrest and false imprisonment.

In April 2019, Sussex Police said the disruption could have been an inside job. No culprit or evidence of drones was found; some commentators have suggested there was no drone, and that the incident may have been caused by mass panic. As of 2020, police maintained the incident was a malicious attack.

== Events ==
Gatwick Airport is a major international airport near Crawley, West Sussex, England, 29.5 miles (47.5 km) south of Central London. It is the second-busiest airport by total passenger traffic in the UK, after Heathrow Airport.

On 19 December 2018, shortly after 9 pm, a security officer reported seeing two drones while waiting at a bus stop at Gatwick Airport: one above a vehicle, and the other above a nearby perimeter fence. Due to the risk of collision with aircraft, Gatwick immediately closed its only runway and suspended all flights. Within half an hour, six more sightings had been reported, five from police officers. A number of flights were cancelled or diverted, stranding thousands of travellers. By midnight, 58 flights had been cancelled. The sightings of drones were reported up to 9 am the following day, in approximately hourly intervals.

The following day, Gatwick prepared to reopen the runway several times; each time, more drone sightings were reported. This led police to believe the operator was intentionally disrupting flights, and may have access to airport radar or communication systems. No act of terrorism was suspected. Police suspected that any drone would have been of an "industrial" class.

Later that day, the military were deployed along with officers from five other police forces, following a request from Sussex Police for help to end the unprecedented situation. Authorities later stated that the suspected drone operator was within a 5-mile (8 km) radius of the airport. Gatwick reopened with limited capacity at around 06:00 on 21 December.

At 09:30 on 21 December, Gatwick Airport chief operating officer Chris Woodroofe described the airport as operating at "almost normal runway conditions", and said it would be "back to normal" by the end of the day. At 17:30, the runway was closed again due to a suspected drone sighting, before being reopened at 18:23.

There were delays to some scheduled flights on 22 December, resulting from the displacement of crews and aircraft. The RAF withdrew on 3 January 2019 after Gatwick spent £5 million on a system to prevent attacks. During the crisis, it had been reported that the Army had been deployed and would be using the Drone Dome – an Israeli-developed counter UAS system – at Gatwick. The Ministry of Defence later confirmed that the RAF Regiment had been deployed and were using an alternative system as the Israeli one had not yet been delivered. In total, the incident diverted or cancelled approximately 1,000 flights, affecting around 140,000 passengers.

== Investigation ==
The investigation into the disruption lasted 18 months, cost £800,000 and involved five different police forces. Gatwick Airport offered a £50,000 reward for information leading to the arrest of the perpetrators. 170 drone sightings were reported, 115 of which were deemed "credible" by police. No videos or photographs of the drone were given to the police. The National Police Air Service (NPAS) was enlisted to search the Gatwick area between 19 and 31 December 2018.

Chief Constable Giles York said the police believed the original sightings were of an unauthorised drone, but that later sightings may have been of a drone used by Sussex Police. In April 2019, Sussex Police said the disruption was likely caused by someone with knowledge of Gatwick "operational procedures", and that the drone pilot "seemed to be able to see what was happening on the runway".

The investigation was closed on 27 September 2019, citing lack of new information. No culprit or evidence of drone use was found. There are no known photographs or videos of the drone, and authorities have no official description of the drone.

=== Arrests ===
On 21 December 2018, a couple from Crawley, less than two miles from Gatwick Airport, were arrested on suspicion of disrupting civil aviation "to endanger or likely to endanger safety of operations or persons", a criminal offence with a maximum sentence of life imprisonment under the Aviation and Maritime Security Act 1990. On 23 December, the couple were ruled out of the investigation and released without charge, having been questioned for almost 36 hours. Their names and photographs were published by some news outlets, and they were named by the local Member of Parliament, Henry Smith, but not by the police.

The police had arrested the couple after learning they were drone enthusiasts who lived close to the airport. In a statement, the couple said they felt "completely violated" by the police and media intrusion into their lives. Speaking to the BBC on 29 December 2018, Giles York, the Chief Constable of Sussex Police, said he felt sorry for the couple but that their arrest was justified. No further arrests were made. In June 2020, Sussex Police paid £200,000 to the couple in an out-of-court settlement.

== Alternative explanations ==
Despite the number of reports, police received no photographs or videos of drones during the disruption. On 23 December, a few days after the incident, DCS Jason Tingley of Sussex Police said it was possible there had never been any drone activity. The next day, following criticism of the statement, Sussex Police chief constable Giles Yorke said he was certain a drone had been used, citing 92 "credible" reports. In 2019, an air traffic expert and a drone instructor quoted by the BBC speculated that the "drone" had in fact been a bird, a plastic bag, a balloon, a paper lantern or a distant manned aircraft.

In 2020, the Guardian journalist Samira Shackle published an investigation into the incident. Shackle suggested it was an instance of mass panic, in which "people attribute a sinister cause to something that had been there, unnoticed, all along". She cited studies showing that humans are inept at assessing distant fast-moving objects, and suggested that the initial sightings were of objects other than drones. Sussex Police and Gatwick maintained that it was a malicious attack.

In September 2021, the Boston Dynamics vice president of global affairs, Brendan Schulman, who was previously an executive of the drone manufacturer DJI, said it was "clear" that the Gatwick incident had not involved a drone. He cited the lack of evidence for any drone in documents released through freedom-of-information requests, and said: "I can now comfortably say this as someone no longer in the industry, because it won't be attributed to an industry company who might sensationally be accused of being in denial."

Sussex Police did not respond to repeated freedom-of-information requests made by drone enthusiasts and experts about the drone sightings. A freedom-of-information request in 2024 showed that the NPAS recorded no drone sightings at Gatwick between 19 and 31 December 2018.

== Response ==
=== Aviation ===
Stewart Wingate, Chief Executive of Gatwick Airport, issued a statement and apology for the disruption. Chief Operating Officer Chris Woodroofe added:

I think what's clear from the last 24 hours is that drones are a UK aviation issue, or even an international aviation issue. We have had the police, we have had the military seeking to bring this drone down for the last 24 hours and to date that has not been successful.

The Civil Aviation Authority announced it considered the event an "extraordinary circumstance", and therefore airlines were not obliged to pay compensation to passengers. The British Airline Pilots' Association said:

We understand that detection and tracking equipment has now been installed around the perimeter of Gatwick and the expectation is that if and when the drones reappear, they will be detected and the airport will close again. It is possible that the rogue drones may go undetected around the perimeter or could obstruct the flight paths outside the immediate detection zone.

Gatwick installed an anti-drone system in November 2019, followed by Heathrow in January 2020.

=== Consumer ===
Alex Neill, the Which? managing director for home products and services, said:

This situation will understandably be frustrating for both the airlines and the tens of thousands of passengers travelling to and from Gatwick ahead of Christmas. Whilst these extraordinary circumstances unfortunately mean you are not entitled to compensation, you may still be entitled to meals, refreshments, hotel accommodation or transfers. You don't have to cancel your tickets though, as depending on the length of the delay, your airline should be providing you with alternative travel options or accommodation.

=== Political ===
Prime Minister Theresa May said in a statement:

I feel for all those passengers whose travel plans have been disrupted by this drone activity and the action that has had to be taken in response to it. At this particular time of year this is particularly difficult for people. We have already passed legislation in relation to the use of drones. As it has been made clear, the activity we have seen is illegal and those who are caught endangering aircraft can face up to five years in prison. And we're consulting on further aspects of this including further police powers. We will continue to work with the Gatwick authorities in order to bring this to a close such that people will be able to get on to the travel that they were expecting over the Christmas.

In a tweet, the Ministry of Defence (MoD) said Defence Secretary Gavin Williamson had confirmed the military deployment and said: "The armed forces have a range of unique capabilities and this isn't something we would usually deploy but we are there to assist and do everything we can so that they are in a position to open the airport at the earliest opportunity."

Transport Secretary Chris Grayling told Sky News: "One of the things we're going to be doing is temporarily lifting the night-flight restrictions at other airports so more planes can get into and out of the country."

Shadow Secretary of State for Transport Andy McDonald said:

Events at Gatwick Airport highlight the urgent need for clear rules on the use of drones near airports. There has been growing concern over the increasing number of near misses between drones and manned aircraft and the Government has been too slow to act. The Government should fast-track the introduction of a regulatory framework to protect against the misuse of drones and ensure the safety of UK airspace. This should include a drone exclusion zone around airports.

Karl Turner, the former Labour Shadow Attorney General for England and Wales, said on BBC Newsnight:

There should be wider exclusion zones around airports. I think the law says one kilometre at the moment, it should probably be five kilometres according to the experts. The government should have brought this legislation forward, it's been an abject failure and I blame Chris Grayling. He should have been in the House of Commons today making a statement and explaining to MPs why the Government has failed to bring this legislation forward.

On 24 December, security minister Ben Wallace announced that "The huge proliferation of such devices, coupled with the challenges of deploying military counter measures into a civilian environment, means there are no easy solutions... However, I can say that we are able to now deploy detection systems throughout the UK to combat this threat." On 10 January 2019, the UK government announced that military-grade anti-drone protection would be placed in major UK airports.

== Other drone incidents ==
There were previous drone incidents at Gatwick Airport on 3 July 2017 and 9 July 2017. The latter was not made public until 15 October 2017. On the evening of 28 April 2019, Gatwick closed temporarily due to an unconfirmed sighting of a drone. It was the first sighting since the incidents of December 2018. Three flights diverted to London Stansted Airport, and returned to Gatwick around 90 minutes later.

== See also ==
- List of UAV-related incidents
- Timeline of Gatwick Airport
- Mass psychogenic illness
- 2024 US air base drone incursions in the United Kingdom
