= 2019–20 Colorado drone sightings =

The 2019–20 Colorado drone sightings were a series of widely sighted unidentified drones observed in the skies of northeastern Colorado and western Nebraska between December 2019 and January 2020. According to witness reports, the drones flew in grid formations in groups of up to 19 and were visible at night between 6 and 10 pm. The Federal Aviation Administration (FAA), FBI, and local law enforcement investigated the sightings, but have not yet determined the operator of the drones.

== Overview ==
Observations of mysterious drones spotted in northeastern Colorado and western Nebraska were first reported in December 2019. The drones were described as having blinking lights and a wingspan of about six feet (1.8 m). According to the Denver Post, the drones flew in groups of six to 10 and were usually seen between 7 and 10 pm. The sheriff of Phillips County, Colorado described the formation as "a grid search" and stated that the size and number of drones makes it unlikely that they are being operated by hobbyists. One witness in Palisade, Nebraska counted 19 drones at one time, some hovering and others flying in formations in small groups. The drones fly at an altitude between 200–500 ft (61–152 m).

Sheriffs in the affected counties stated that the drones did not appear to be "malicious" and are not violating local laws, although the sheriff of Morgan County, Colorado said the situation is "very unnerving for our citizens." Flying a drone at night without a waiver from the Federal Aviation Administration (FAA) is illegal. Drone pilots also require waivers from the FAA to fly long distances, in coordinated formations, or at altitudes higher than 400 feet (120 m). The FAA checked with drone companies and unmanned aircraft test sites in the area, and has confirmed that none of them are operating the drones.

An interagency meeting was held in Brush, Colorado on 6 January 2020, involving more than 70 federal, state, and local agencies, including the Federal Bureau of Investigation, U.S. Air Force, FAA, and state and local law enforcement to discuss the sightings. Following the meeting local law enforcement was briefly engaged in a search for an unspecified "command vehicle", which was not found before the lookout was rescinded. The Colorado Division of Fire Prevention and Control also used a Pilatus PC-12 multi-mission aircraft in an effort to locate the drones in early January.

Sightings had tapered off by the end of January, and the Colorado Department of Public Safety ended active investigation around the same time. The department issued a report concluding that the majority of sightings were attributable to planets, stars, commercial aircraft, and hobbyist drones.

== Possible explanations ==
On January 5, 2020, The Colorado Springs Gazette reported that the U.S. Air Force confirmed that it conducts counter-drone exercises out of the Francis E. Warren Air Force Base in Cheyenne, Wyoming. The Air Force Global Strike Command oversees Minuteman missile silos located in northeastern Colorado, southeastern Wyoming and western Nebraska, and carries out extensive testing of commercially available drones in order to defend missile silos from surveillance or attacks. In an interview, an air force representative would neither claim nor deny ownership of the drones. However, one reporter said that another reporter had stated that the base denied it when she contacted them.

Allison Sylte, a reporter for 9 News in Denver, reached out to government agencies such as the U.S. Air Force, FAA, the North American Aerospace Defense Command, the National Oceanic and Atmospheric Administration, and the Colorado Department of Transportation, all of which have denied involvement with the drone sightings. Private companies such as Google, Amazon, and Uber have also stated that they are not responsible for the drones.

Omaha television station WOWT captured video of an object initially identified as a drone in Saunders County on January 7; it was later identified as likely being a FedEx Cessna Caravan.

The Denver Post reported on January 13 that the Colorado Department of Public Safety was scaling back their response to reported drones.

VICE News reported on January 29 that the drones "were not real".

== Public response ==
On January 2, Governor Jared Polis issued a statement saying "I'm actively monitoring the reports of drone sightings in eastern Colorado and share the expressed concerns of law enforcement and local residents". After a drone flew within 100 feet (30 m) of a Flight for Life medical helicopter, Polis stated that the drones were "no longer a novelty," and directed the Colorado Department of Public Safety to do more state monitoring, including the use of both ground-based teams and aircraft.

United States Representative Adrian Smith of Nebraska issued a press release on January 7 expressing his concern about the unidentified drones, stating "we must protect the privacy and property rights of Nebraskans."

The mayor of Yuma, Colorado has proposed new laws in response to the drone sightings which would restrict the use of drones to personal property and require operators to obtain a permit to fly within the city.

== See also ==
- 2024 United States drone sightings
- List of unmanned aerial vehicle-related incidents
- Jetpack man
- List of reported UFO sightings
