= Missy Cummings =

American space systems engineer and Navy pilot

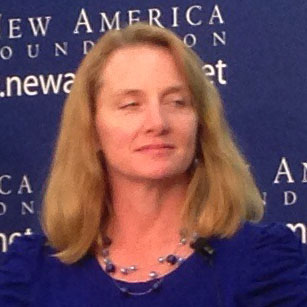
- Born: Mary Louise Cummings; 1966 (age 59–60)

Academic background
- Education: United States Naval Academy (BS); Naval Postgraduate School (MS); University of Virginia (PhD)

Senior Advisor to the National Highway Traffic Safety Administration for Safety
- In office October 2021 – January 2023
- President: Joe Biden

Military service
- Branch/service: United States Navy
- Years of service: 1988–1999

Mary Louise "Missy" Cummings (born 1966) is an American academic who was a professor at Duke University and director of Duke's Humans and Autonomy Laboratory. She was one of the United States Navy's first female fighter pilots. In November 2021, Dr. Cummings joined the National Highway Traffic Safety Administration (NHTSA). She currently teaches at George Mason University.

== Education ==
Cummings received her Bachelor of Science in mathematics from the United States Naval Academy in 1988, a Master of Science in space systems engineering from the Naval Postgraduate School in 1994, and a PhD in systems engineering from the University of Virginia in 2004. Her doctoral thesis was Designing Decision Support Systems for Revolutionary Command and Control Domains.

== Career ==
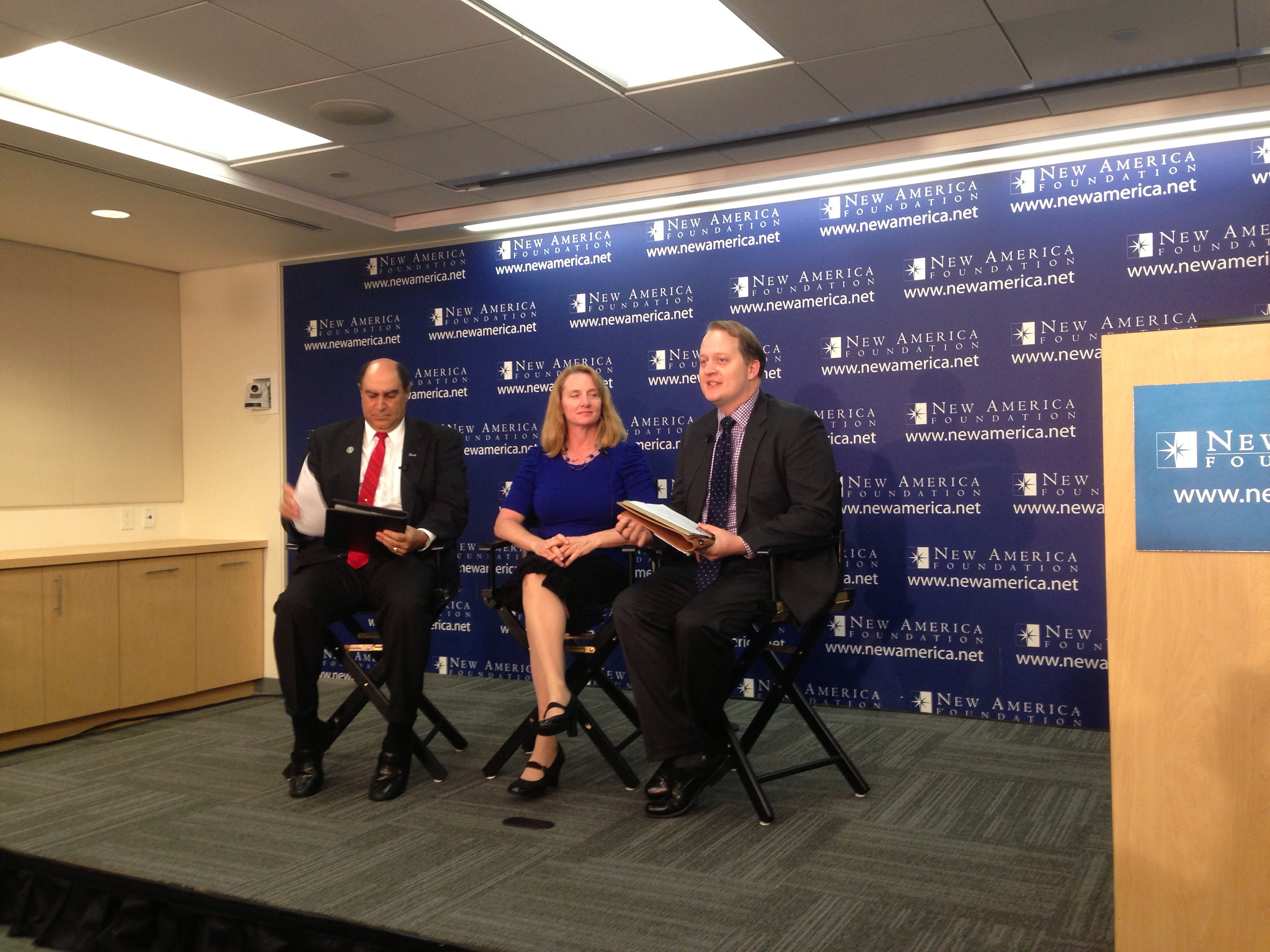
Michael Toscano, Missy Cummings and Shane Harris at #FTdrones panel

Cummings spent eleven years (1988–1999) as a naval officer and military pilot, earning the rank of lieutenant, and was one of the United States Navy's first female fighter pilots, flying an F/A-18 Hornet. She became a fighter pilot shortly after the Combat Exclusion Policy was repealed in 1993, and her book Hornet's Nest recounts her experience with discrimination and hostility as one of the first women in the fighter pilot community. Her first call sign was Medusa and her second was Shrew.

For her last tour in the Navy, Cummings was an NROTC instructor at Pennsylvania State University. After the Navy, she became an assistant professor at Virginia Tech in the school's Engineering Fundamentals Division. After obtaining her PhD at the University of Virginia, she became an associate professor of aeronautics and astronautics at the Massachusetts Institute of Technology. She became a full professor at Duke University in 2016. Cummings served on the Board of Directors for the automotive technology company Veoneer, Inc. from 2018 to 2021. She resigned and sold all of her shares in October 2021 prior to starting at the NHTSA.

As of 2021, Cummings is the director of George Mason University's Autonomy and Robotics Center and a professor at the university. She is an affiliate professor with the University of Washington’s Aeronautics and Astronautics Department and an American Institute of Aeronautics and Astronautics Fellow.

=== NHTSA appointment and responses ===
In October 2021, the NHTSA named Cummings as a new senior advisor for safety at the NHTSA on a "temporary assignment" through the Intergovernmental Personnel Act. Her appointment to the NHTSA was met with criticism from Tesla's CEO Elon Musk and personal harassment and death threats from Tesla advocates in response to her previous statements critical of Tesla. U.S. Secretary of Transportation Pete Buttigieg defended Cummings' appointment, and the NHTSA said that it was "look[ing] forward to leveraging her experience and leadership in safety and autonomous technologies." National Transportation Safety Board chair Jennifer Homendy surmised the Tesla advocates' responses to be a "calculated attempt to distract from the real safety issues". In January 2022, Cummings was required by NHTSA to recuse herself from any matters related to Tesla.

Cummings later parted ways with NHTSA and joined George Mason University as a professor and director of Mason's Autonomy and Robotics Center.

== Focus and views ==
Cummings's research interests include human supervisory control, artificial intelligence, human-autonomous system collaboration and human-robot interaction, human-systems engineering, and the socio-ethical impact of technology. Cummings has written on the brittleness of machine learning and future applications for drones. In addition, she has spoken critically of the safety of Tesla's Full Self-Driving Capability surrounding its reliance on computer vision.
