= Dornier Flugzeugwerke =

German aircraft manufacturer

Dornier-Werke GmbH
- Type: Privately held company
- Industry: aerospace
- Founded: 1914; 112 years ago
- Defunct: 2002
- Fate: Acquired by Fairchild Aircraft in 1996
- Successor: Airbus
- Headquarters: Manzell, Friedrichshafen, Germany
- Key people: Claude Dornier
- Parent: Daimler-Benz (from 1985)

Dornier Flugzeugwerke was a German aircraft manufacturer founded in Friedrichshafen in 1914 by Claude Dornier. Over the course of its long lifespan, the company produced many designs for both the civil and military markets.

== History ==
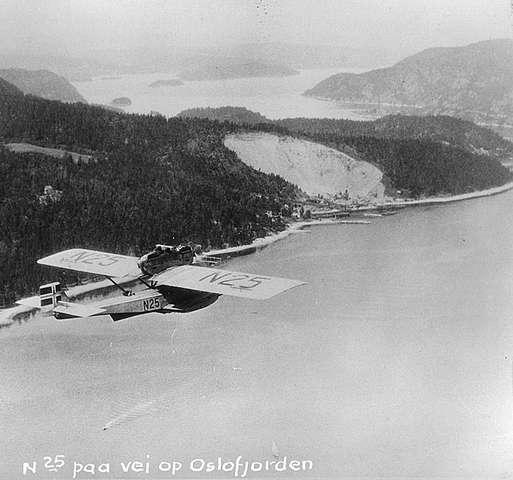
Dornier Wal flown by Roald Amundsen on his first attempt to reach the North Pole

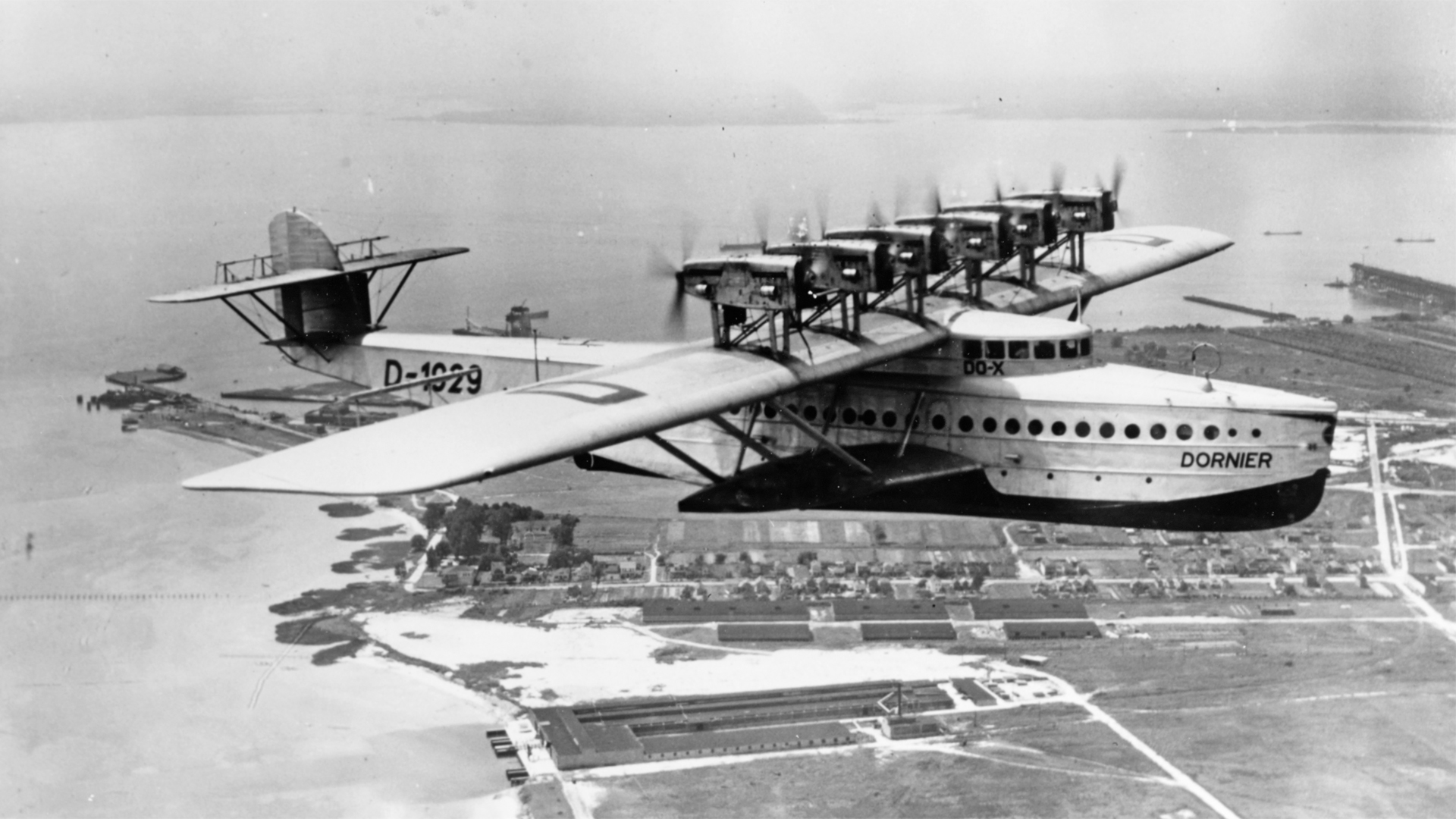
Dornier Do X, the largest and heaviest aircraft of its era

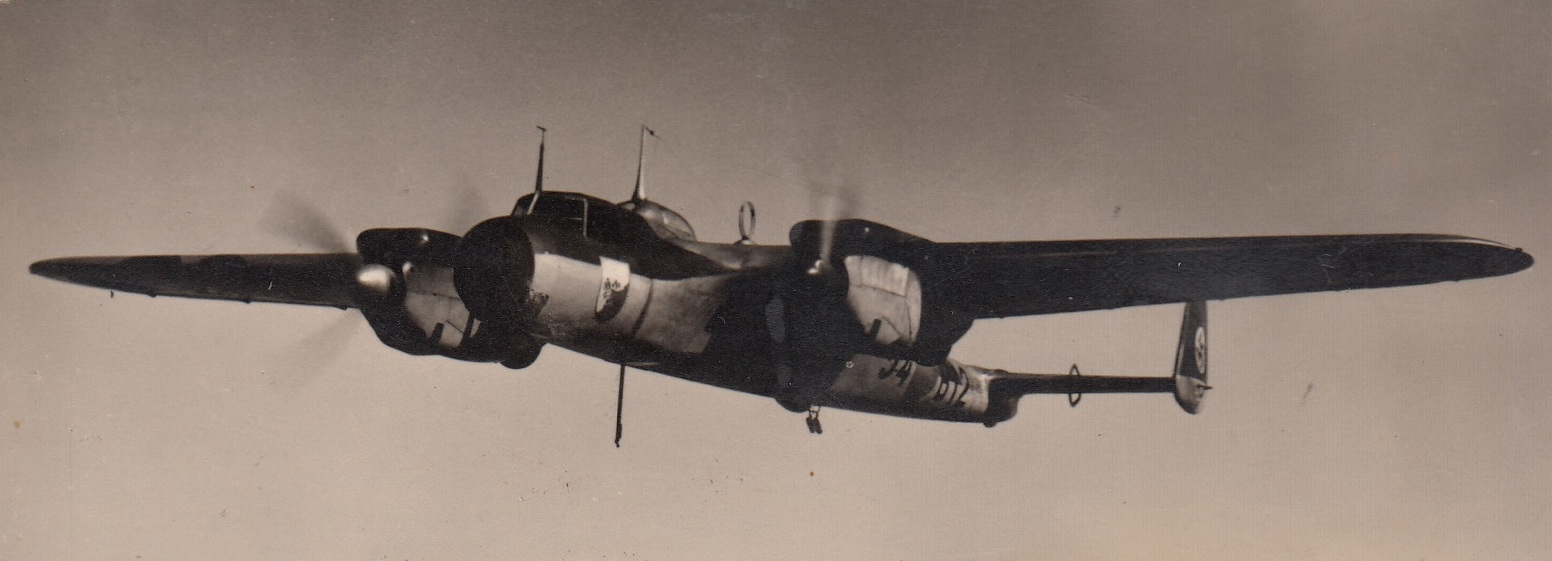
Dornier Do 17 "flying pencil" bomber

Originally Dornier Metallbau, Dornier Flugzeugwerke took over Flugzeugbau Friedrichshafen production facilities (Weingarten, Warnemünde, and the former Zeppelin shed at Manzell) when it failed in 1923.

Dornier was well known between the two world wars as a manufacturer of large, all-metal flying boats and of land based airliners. The record-breaking 1924 Wal (English: Whale) was used on many long-distance flights and the Do X set records for its immense size and weight. Dornier's successful landplane airliners, including the Komet (Comet) and Merkur (Mercury), were used by Lufthansa and other European carriers during the 1920s and early 30s. Dornier built its aircraft outside Germany during much of this period due to the restrictions placed on German aircraft manufacturers by the Treaty of Versailles: locations included Altenrhein, Switzerland, 12 km from Zeppelin's Lindau (Bodensee) location. Foreign factories licence-building Dornier products included CMASA and Piaggio in Italy, CASA in Spain, Kawasaki in Japan, and Aviolanda in the Netherlands. Once the Nazi government came to power and abandoned the treaty's restrictions, Dornier resumed production in Germany.

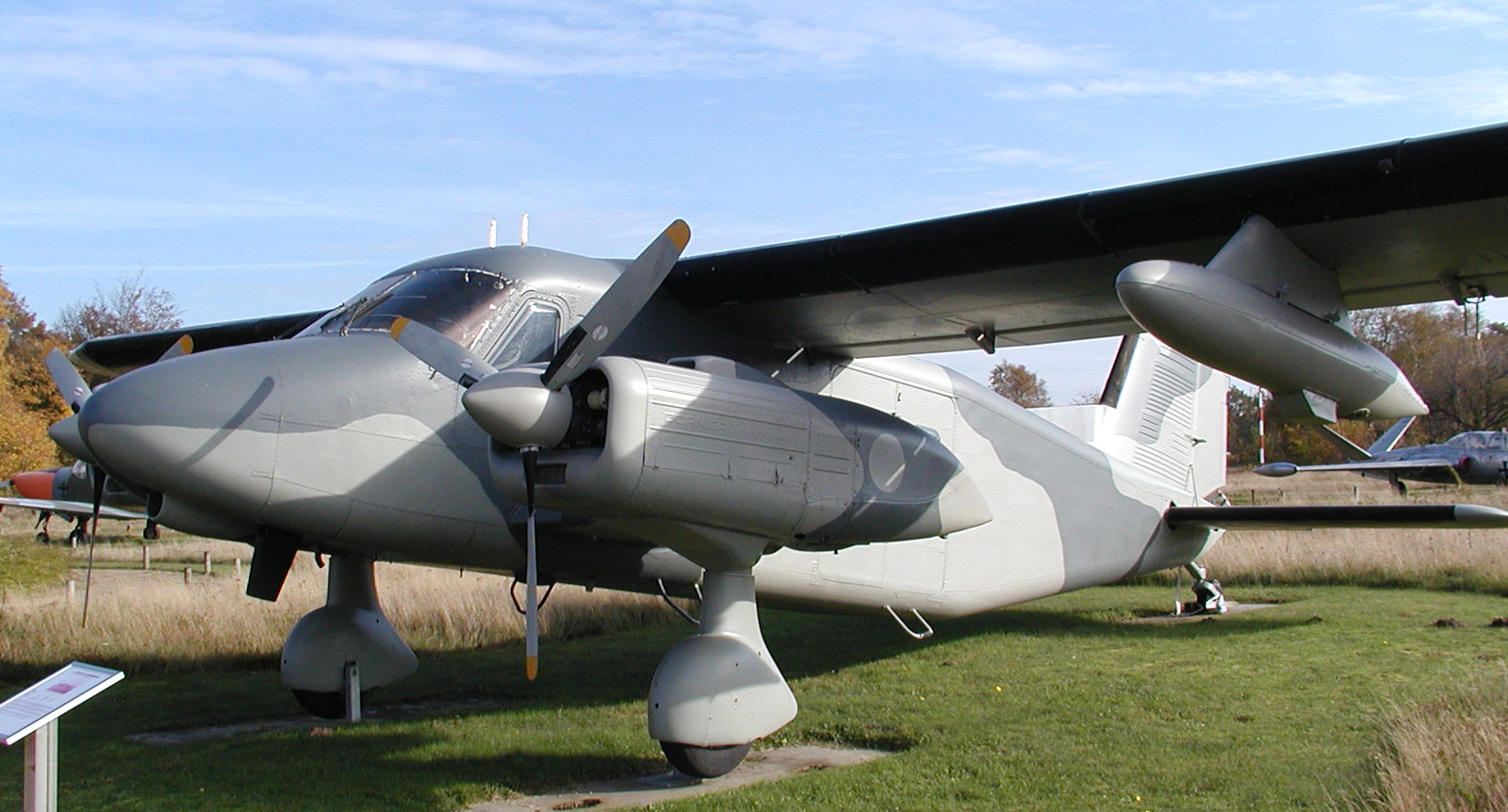
Dornier Do 28 D-2 Skyservant

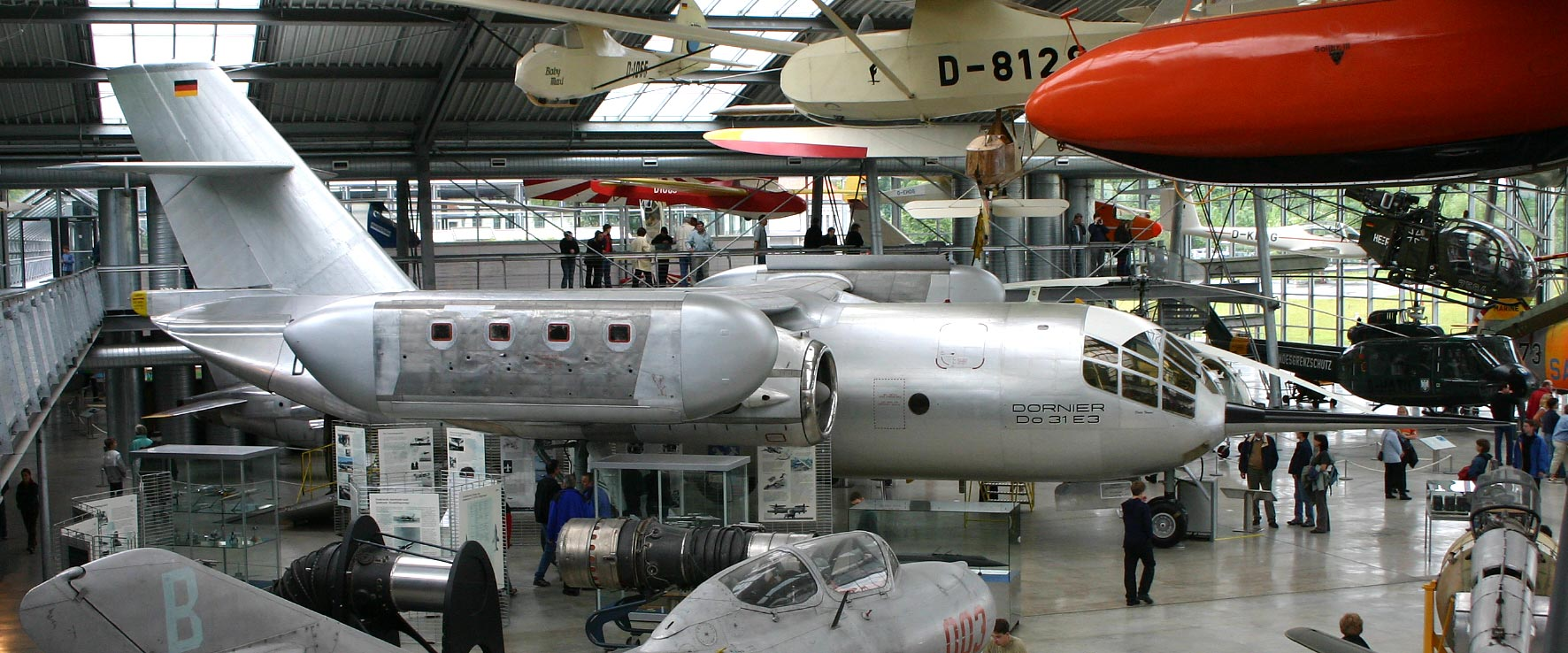
Do 31

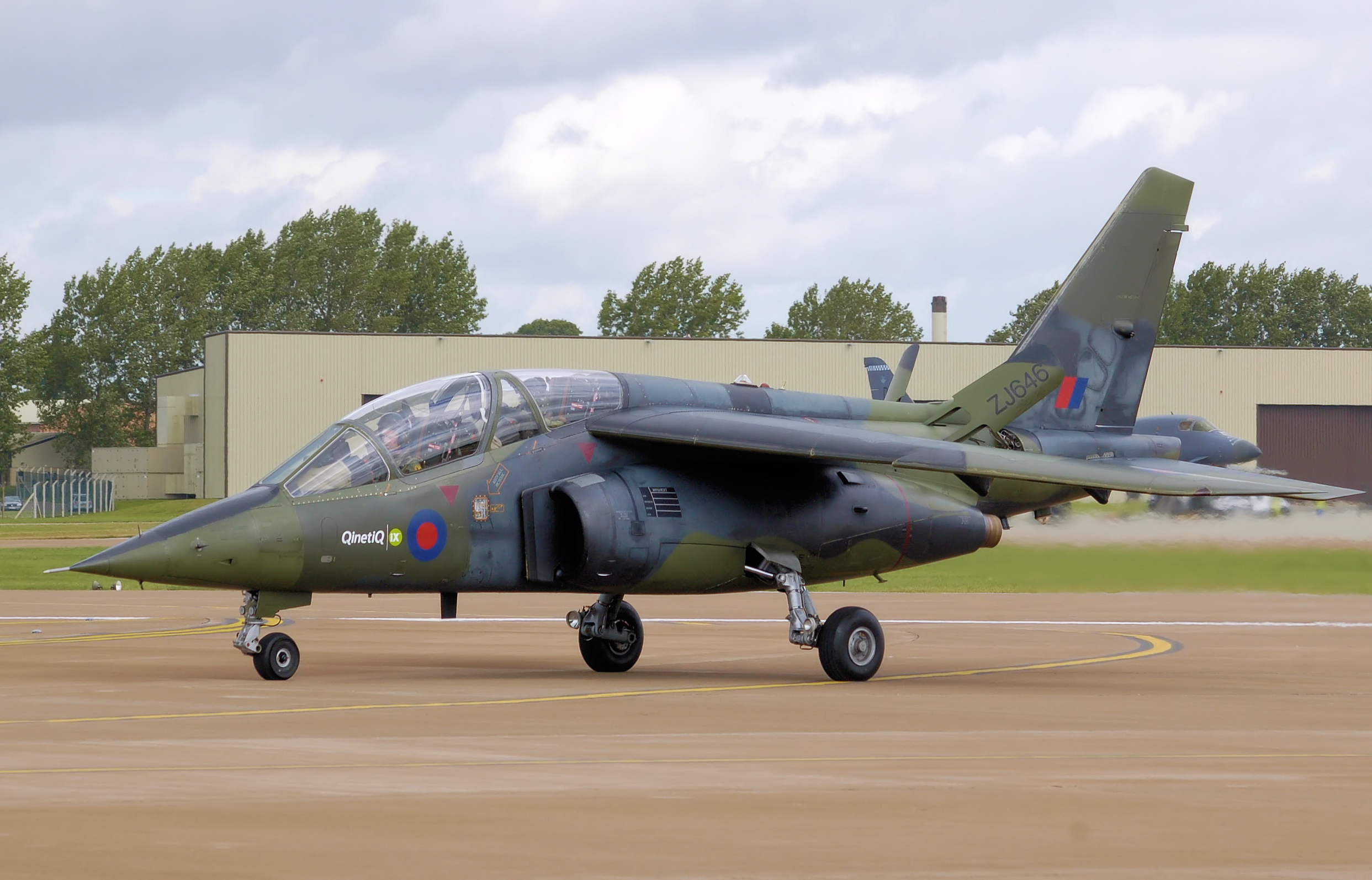
Dassault-Breguet/Dornier Alpha Jet of the UK defence technology organisation QinetiQ

The success of the Wal family encouraged the development of derivatives, and of more advanced successors, such as the Do 18, and Do 24 which saw service in several armed forces, including German, into World War II.

Dornier's most important World War II military aircraft design was the Do 17, nicknamed The Flying Pencil. It first flew in 1934 as a mailplane for Lufthansa but due to its narrow fuselage (hence its nickname) it was not commercially viable and was passed over. Dornier then developed it further as a military aircraft, with a prototype bomber flying in 1935, and in 1937 it was used in by the German Condor Legion during the Spanish Civil War. Production continued in Germany and it was developed to fill multiple roles for the Luftwaffe. As a medium bomber it saw service during the early part of World War II, particularly during the Battle of Britain. It was later developed into a nightfighter to counter the RAF bomber offensive. Dornier developed the similar looking Do 217 from the Do 17 but it was a larger and completely new design. Dornier also developed the fastest piston-engined fighter of the war, the twin-engined Do 335, which was too late to see service.

After WWII, aircraft production was again forbidden in Germany, and Dornier relocated to Spain and then to Switzerland where the firm provided aeronautical consultancy services until returning to Germany in 1954. Post-war, Dornier re-established itself with successful STOL Do 27 and Do 28 utility planes. In 1974 it joined a joint venture with French aircraft manufacturers Dassault-Breguet to develop the Alpha Jet.

In 1983, Hindustan Aeronautics Limited (HAL) acquired a production licence for the Dornier 228 and manufactured the aircraft for the Asian market. By 2013 a total of 117 Dornier 228 aircraft had been produced by HAL with plans to build 20 more during 2013-14. Pushpindar Singh Chopra was the agent of Dornier to India during this contract.

In 1985, Dornier became a member of the Daimler-Benz group, integrating its aeronautic assets with the parent company. As part of this transaction, Lindauer Dornier GmbH was spun off, creating a separate, family-owned firm, concentrating on textile machinery design and manufacturing. The rest of the company was split into several subsidiaries for defence, satellites, medtech and aircraft.

In 1996, the majority of Dornier Aircraft was acquired by Fairchild Aircraft, forming Fairchild Dornier. This company became insolvent in early 2002. Production of its 328 Jet was acquired by US company Avcraft. Asian groups continued to show interest in its 728 version in August 2004, but production was not restarted. Dornier 228 production was taken over by Swiss manufacturer RUAG, who then sold it off to General Atomics in 2020. Other subsidiaries became part of the EADS.

The medtech division was sold to an investment company and now bears the name Dornier MedTech. Dornier Medtech manufactures medical equipment, such as the Dornier S lithotripter, HM3, Compact Delta to treat kidney stones. Dornier MedTech also manufactures laser devices for a wide range of applications.

=== Dornier Seaplane Company ===
The Dornier family have a spin-off company and project, the Dornier Seastar. It is a turboprop-powered amphibious aircraft built largely of composite materials. This was developed by Claudius Dornier Jr., and later by his son Conrado by Dornier Seawings.

=== Dornier Technologie ===
Claude's grandson, Iren Dornier, founded Dornier Technologie in 1996 to manufacture the Dornier S-Ray 007.

== Dornier aircraft projects ==
=== Letter designations (before 1933) ===
Does not include designations for aircraft built while Dornier was with Zeppelin-Lindau.

- Dornier Do Gs I, precursor to Wal destroyed by Military Inter-Allied Commission of Control (1919)
- Dornier Do A Libelle (I 1921, III redesignated Do 12)
- Dornier Spatz, landplane version of Do A (1922)
- Dornier Do B Merkur, airliner; development of Do C (1926)
- Dornier Do C Komet, military version of the Komet (I 1921, II 1922, III 1926)
- Dornier Do C 2, 3, 4, fighter unrelated to earlier Do C, redesignated Do 10 in 1933 (C 2 ?, C 3 1931, C 4 1932)
- Dornier Do D, heavily revised floatplane torpedo bomber version for the Royal Yugoslav Air Force (1929)
- Dornier Do E, small reconnaissance flying boat (1924)
- Dornier Do F, heavy bomber (1932); redesignated Do 11 in 1933
- Dornier Do G, Greif (Cancelled 1920 project)
- Dornier Do H Falke, fighter developed from the Zeppelin-Lindau D.I (1922)
- Dornier Do I, twin-engine long range reconnaissance aircraft (1923)
- Dornier Do J Wal, twin-engine flying boat (1922)
- Dornier Do K, four-engine airliner/cargo freighter (K 1 1929, K 2 1929, K 3 1931)
- Dornier Do L Delphin, single-engine commercial flying boat (I 1920, II 1921, III 1927)
- Dornier Do N Design for the Imperial Japanese Army and used as Type 87 Heavy Bomber. Internal Kawasaki designation was Ka 87 (1926)
- Dornier Do O Wal Custom built version of Do J for expedition to South America (1924)
- Dornier Do P, four-engine heavy bomber (1930); led to the Do 11
- Dornier Do Q
- Dornier Do R.2 and R.4 Superwal, two (later four) engine flying boat airliner (1924)
- Dornier Do S, four-engine, 22-passenger flying boat airliner (1930)
- Dornier Do T, Komet/Merkur converted to air ambulance
- Dornier Do U (Cancelled civil variant of Do Y)
- Dornier Do X 12-engine passenger flying boat (1929); largest flying boat at the time
- Dornier Do Y, trimotor monoplane bomber (1930, redesignated Do 15)

Additional unbuilt projects include 3 different Schneider Trophy racers from 1924, 1928 and 1931 and a large multi-engine seaplane similar to the Do X with engines buried in the wings.

=== 1933–1945 ===
- Dornier Do 10, RLM designation for the Do C4
- Dornier Do 11, RLM designation for the Do F
- Dornier Do 12, small flying boat
- Dornier Do 13, twin-engine bomber; improved Do 11
- Dornier Do 14, experimental seaplane
- Dornier Do 15, RLM designation for the Do Y
- Dornier Do 16, RLM designation for the Do J II Wal
- Dornier Do 17, twin-engine light bomber; nicknamed Fliegender Bleistift ("flying pencil")
- Dornier Do 18, flying boat; Do 16 development
- Dornier Do 19, four-engine heavy bomber, Ural bomber candidate
- Dornier Do 20, proposed passenger flying boat; improved and enlarged Do X with wing-mounted diesel engines
- Dornier Do 22, torpedo bomber/reconnaissance seaplane; only for the export market
- Dornier Do 23, twin-engine medium bomber; improved Do 11
- Dornier Do 24, three-engine reconnaissance/SAR/bomber flying boat
- Dornier Do 26, four-engine transport/reconnaissance flying boat
- Dornier Do 29 (1934), proposed heavy fighter (Zerstörer) derived from the Do 17; number reused postwar
- Dornier Do 212, experimental flying boat
- Dornier Do 214, long-range transport flying boat project; cancelled by 1943 due to the worsening war situation
- Dornier Do 215, light bomber/night fighter; originally designated Do 17Z
- Dornier Do 216, four-engine large military flying boat project; rejected due to lack of demand
- Dornier Do 217, bomber developed from the Do 17
- Dornier Do 317, medium bomber prototype developed from the Do 217; cancelled as it had no advantage over the Do 217
- Dornier Do 318, enlarged Do 24 (project)
- Dornier Do 335, fighter-bomber
- Dornier Do 417, twin-engine multirole aircraft project; cancelled as it was inferior to the Ju 188
- Dornier Do 635, twin fuselage version of Do 335; also known as Do 335Z
- Dornier P.59, fighter project
- Dornier P.85, "Sea-Stuka", twin-engine; similar to Do 217 with floats
- Dornier P.184, transport; parallel development to the BV 144
- Dornier P.232, mixed propulsion fighter
- Dornier P.247, single-seat fighter with pusher propeller; further development of the Do 335
- Dornier P.252, night fighter with two Jumo 213 engines
- Dornier P.254, mixed-propulsion aircraft
- Dornier P 256, turbojet night fighter version of the Do 335
- Dornier P.273, high-altitude fighter

=== 1945–present ===
- Dornier Do 25, prototype for Do 27
- Dornier Do 27, STOL light utility aircraft
- Dornier Do 28, twin-engine STOL light utility aircraft developed from Do 27
- Dornier Do 29, experimental V/STOL aircraft with tilting propellers
- Dornier Do 31, experimental jet engine VTOL transport
- Dornier Do 32, ultralight, collapsible tip jet helicopter
- Dornier 128, improved Do 28D-2
- Dornier Do 131, version of Do 31 with liftjets
- Dornier Do 132, utility helicopter with tip jets (project)
- Dornier 228 – twin turboprop STOL utility aircraft developed from the Do 28
- Dornier Do 231, VTOL transport aircraft project
- Dassault/Dornier Alpha Jet, light attack jet/advanced trainer
- Dornier 328, turboprop commuter airliner
- Fairchild Dornier 328JET, turbofan version of 328
- Fairchild Dornier 428JET, proposed stretched version of the 328JET; cancelled August 2000
- Fairchild Dornier 728 family, proposed regional jetliner; cancelled in 2002 when Fairchild Dornier went bankrupt
- Dornier Aerodyne, wingless VTOL aircraft
- Dornier DAR, unmanned anti-radar drone
- Dornier Rautenflügel, fighter concept
- Dornier Seastar, turboprop amphibious aircraft
- Dornier S-Ray 007, two-seat, single-engine amphibious aircraft
- Dornier LA-2000, study for a stealth strike aircraft with full delta wing similar to A-12 Avenger

== Dornier Automobile Projects ==
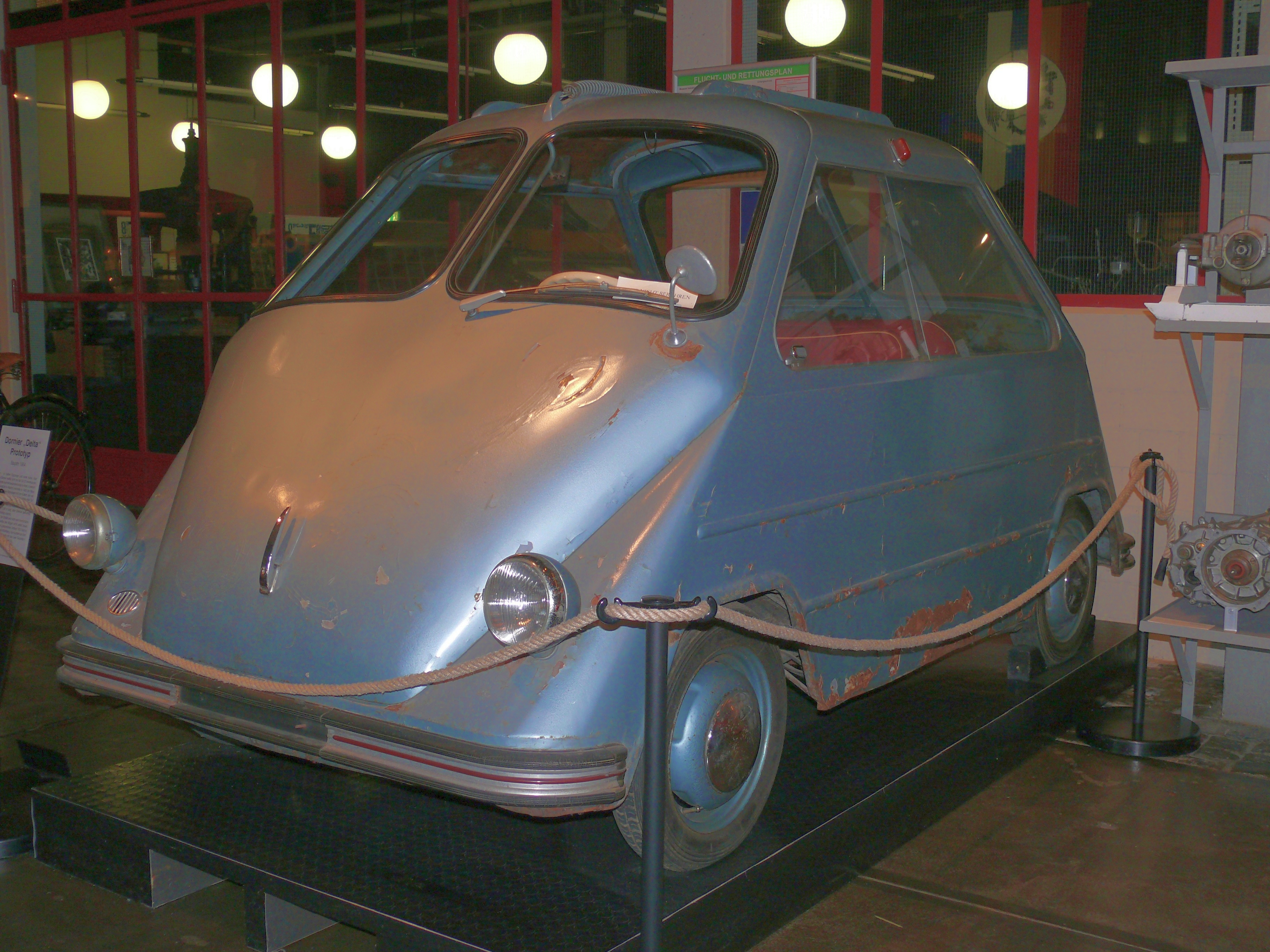
Dornier Delta

- Dornier Delta
- Dornier Delta II, developed for Hymer

== Dornier Faint Object Camera ==
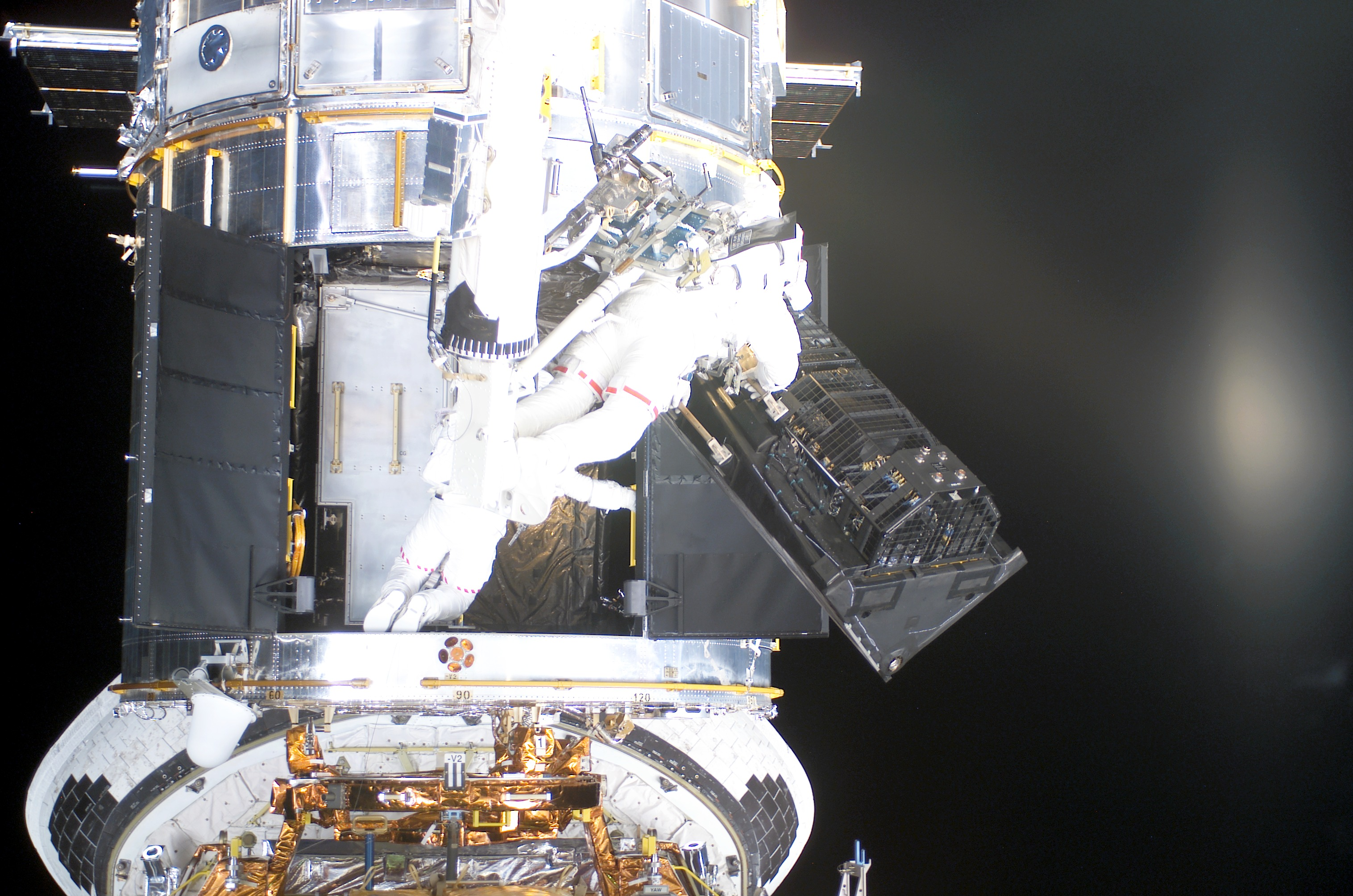
NASA astronauts of Space Shuttle mission STS-109 remove FOC during an EVA

Dornier GmbH built the Faint Object Camera for the Hubble Space Telescope, which was used from 1990 to 2002. The ESA funded the unit, which actually consists of two complete and independent camera systems designed to provide extremely high resolution, exceeding 0.05 arcseconds. It is designed to view very faint UV light from 115 to 650 nanometers in wavelength. It was the last original instrument on the Hubble when it was replaced by the Advanced Camera for Surveys in 2002.

== Missile projects ==
- Dornier Viper

== Drone projects ==
The DAR (Drohne Antiradar) developed in the 1980s.

== Spacecraft ==
- AMC-5 (satellite)
- Project 621 (rocket)

== See also ==
- Dornier Museum Friedrichshafen
- List of RLM aircraft designations
- Zündapp Janus
