= Dornier Do 14 =

Prototype German seaplane

Do 14
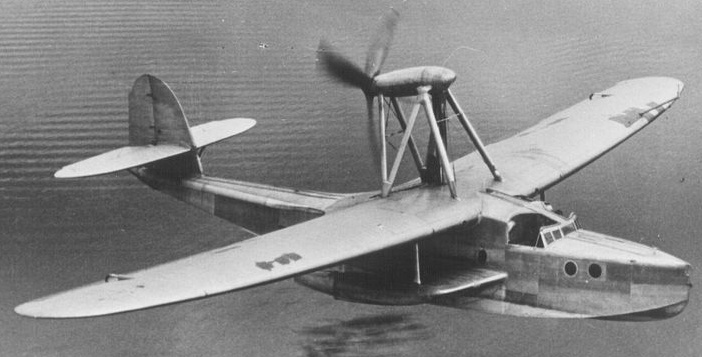

General information
- Type: Experimental Seaplane
- National origin: Germany
- Manufacturer: Dornier Flugzeugwerke
- Designer: Dornier Flugzeugwerke

The Dornier Do 14 was a prototype seaplane, developed by Dornier Flugzeugwerke with backing from the Luftwaffe for experimental propulsion studies. The aircraft was similar to the Dornier Do 12. Only one Dornier Do 14 was constructed for testing, the aircraft registered as "D-AGON", after test flights during 1936, the aircraft engines were subsequently dismantled in 1937. The prototype aircraft was finally scrapped in 1939.

== Specifications ==
Data from

General characteristics

- Crew: two
- Length: 17.95 m (58 ft 11 in)
- Wingspan: 23.34 m (76 ft 7 in)
- Height: 8.35 m (27 ft 5 in)
- Empty weight: 6,120 kg (13,492 lb)
- Gross weight: 7,260 kg (16,006 lb)
- Powerplant: 1 × BMW VId V-12 liquid-cooled piston engine, 560 kW (750 hp)

Performance

- Maximum speed: 446 km/h (277 mph, 241 kn)
- Range: 500 km (310 mi, 270 nmi)
