= Dornier Do Y =

German type of aircraft

Do Y
- A Dornier Do Y of the Royal Yugoslav Air Force

General information
- Type: Bomber
- National origin: Germany
- Manufacturer: Dornier Flugzeugwerke
- Primary user: Royal Yugoslav Air Force
- Number built: 4

History
- First flight: 17 October 1931

The Dornier Do Y was a trimotor German monoplane bomber of the early 1930s designed by Dornier Flugzeugwerke (Dornier Aircraft Works) to an order by the Royal Yugoslav Air Force (RYAF). The Yugoslavs originally intended to use war reparations to pay for them, but ultimately had to use their own funds. Only a pair of aircraft were initially ordered to give the Yugoslavs experience with multi-engine bombers and Dornier failed to sell any more Do Y's. Two improved versions were subsequently built on speculation, but failed to find purchasers until the RYAF bought them in 1935.

All four Do Y's were declared obsolete in 1939 and relegated to training and transport missions. They played no role in the 1941 Invasion of Yugoslavia by the Axis Powers and were captured undamaged. The Germans decided to transfer all of them to the Air Force of the Independent State of Croatia later that year, but only one can be confirmed to have served with the Croatians.

== Background ==
In early 1930 the RYAF decided to order some multi-engined bombers from builders with experience with multi-engine aircraft to gain experience with the type and to evaluate different models before making a decision on purchasing future aircraft. The RYAF had two main requirements: the first was that they use three license-built Gnome-Rhône Jupiter VI air-cooled radial engines and the second was that the bombers had to be delivered by 30 August 1931. Dornier had no suitable design in production that could meet such a tight deadline and had to perform design work in parallel with the Do 11 twin-engined bomber. For example both aircraft used a semi-elliptical wing design based on that of the earlier Do K3 prototype. The company was able to begin construction of two prototypes before the Yugoslavs signed a contract for both on 21 May 1931. These aircraft were unarmed as Germany was not allowed to build military aircraft by the terms of the Versailles Treaty.

The RYAF intended to pay for them using war reparation monies owed to Yugoslavia by Germany, but the effects of the Great Depression on the German economy in 1931 caused U.S. President Herbert Hoover to propose suspension of the reparations payments effective on 1 July and this was later accepted by the signatories to the Versailles Treaty. The Weimar government cancelled all deliveries funded by reparations as of 1 July and Yugoslavia was forced to pay for the Do Ys and other aircraft that it had ordered with its own money. The first prototype flew on 17 October.

Dornier began construction of two improved Do Ys on its initiative the following year as the Do U and unsuccessfully attempted to sell them as airliners to Deutsche Luft Hansa. While negotiations were ongoing, the aircraft was redesignated as the Do 15. Dornier then offered them to the Heereswaffenamt (Army Weapons Department) on 14 January 1933, one civilian aircraft for Lufthansa and the other for the Reichswehr (German Armed Forces). Work continued on the Do 15s until Hermann Göring, the acting Aviation Minister of the new Nazi government, ordered that work be suspended in March. Dornier stored the incomplete aircraft until 1935 when they were inspected by a Yugoslav delegation which placed an order for both in November. Designated the Do Ym by the RYAF, the first flight of these bombers was made on 1 July 1936.

== Description ==
The Do Y was a shoulder-wing monoplane with an all-metal monocoque fuselage formed from duralumin. The structure of the empennage was also duralumin, but it was covered in fabric as were all of the control surfaces. The two-spar cantilever wing was also covered in fabric except for the area behind the octagonal engine nacelles which was duralumin and could be walked upon to facilitate maintenance. There were some issues with wing flutter under certain conditions, but these were mostly resolved during trials. The wing was built in three sections: a center section that extended just past the nacelles and two outer wing panels. The center section housed the bomb bay and the two 1,045-litre (230 imp gal; 276 US gal) fuel tanks. Each engine was provided with a 70-litre (15 imp gal; 18 US gal) lubricating oil tank. The Do Y had fixed conventional landing gear that included a tailwheel at the extreme end of the fuselage. The telescopic legs for the main wheels were attached to the bottom of the forward wing spar and to the fuselage with V-struts and bracing wires.

The bomber was initially powered by three 450-horsepower (340 kW) Gnome-Rhône Jupiter VI radials, driving two-bladed wooden propellers. Two engines were located at the front of the wing while the third was mounted on struts above the fuselage. The RYAF requested that they be replaced by license-built 480-horsepower (360 kW) Gnome-Rhône Jupiter 9Ak engines before delivery, although it is uncertain when this was actually done. (Note: Ostric believes that this was most likely performed in 1932 or 1933.) The wooden propellers were replaced by metal ones before delivery. Aviation historian Sime Ostric believes that the Jupiter radials were first replaced by 420-horsepower (310 kW) Gnome-Rhône 9Ad engines and then by 480 hp Gnome-Rhône 9Ae models in 1937.

The pilot and copilot sat side-by-side in an open cockpit at the top of the fuselage, forward of the wing, each with a minimal windscreen. The copilot also served as the bombardier and could control the Do Y's rudder from the bombardier's position in the lower nose of the aircraft. The rest of the crew consisted of a radio man, a mechanic and possibly an observer. The bomber was armed with five 7.7-millimetre (0.303 in) Darne machine guns, arranged in two twin-weapon installations, one in the upper nose above the bombardier's position and the other in the upper fuselage between the wing and the vertical stabiliser, and a single belly gun. The radio man also served as the forward machine gunner and the mechanic operated in the dorsal machine gun position. The observer, if one was carried, manned the belly gun. The bomb bay could accommodate up to 1,200 kilograms (2,600 lb) of bombs in two racks that were limited to bombs no larger than 200 kilograms (440 lb).

The RYAF required that the license-built 625-horsepower (466 kW) Gnome-Rhône 9Kers engines with three-bladed propellers be fitted to the Do Ym and Dornier replaced the engine nacelles with more efficient NACA cowlings to provide better cooling. In addition the wingspan of the new aircraft was reduced and the fabric covering of the underside of the wing was replaced by duralumin to eliminate the wing flutter experienced by the earlier models. A much more minor change was that more windows were added to the fuselage to improve visibility.

== Operational history ==
The Do Y's gave demonstrations in Austria, Hungary and Romania in early January 1932 in an unsuccessful attempt to gain more orders for the aircraft. They arrived in Yugoslavia later that month and were assigned to the 6th Aviation Regiment (6.Vazduhoplovni Puk) based at Zemun. All of the multi-engine bombers were transferred to the newly formed 261st Aviation Group (261.Vazduhoplovna Grupa) in September 1933. Later that month they participated in a parade in honour of Prince Nicholas of Romania and ferried the prince to Kraljevo and Novi Sad. On 15 October 1934, the Do Y's escorted the train carrying the body of the assassinated King Alexander I from Zemun to Belgrade. The following year the unit was redesignated as the 261st Independent Trimotor Bomber Group (Serbo-Croatian Latin: 261.Nezavizna bombarderska grupa tromotoraca). The bombers finally received their bomb racks and were fitted for their defensive armament that same year, although there is no photographic evidence that the Darne machine guns were ever actually mounted.

The two Do Ym bombers arrived in Yugoslavia in early March 1937 and Prime Minister Milan Stojadinović flew in one of them on 13 March. The Do Y's began general overhauls at the Kraljevo Aviation Depot on 8 October; one aircraft was completed by the end of the year, but the other was not finished until August 1938. The 261st Group was redesignated as the 81st Aviation Regiment during 1938. All of the trimotors were scheduled to be replaced by the Savoia-Marchetti SM.79 in early 1939, but those aircraft were delayed until September. Most of the aircraft were then relegated to transport and liaison roles, but one remained with the 81st Regiment for training duties through mid-1940. Both of the Do Ym aircraft were fitted with large doors on the side of the fuselage, probably for use by paratroopers. All four Do Y's were transferred to Kraljevo at the beginning of 1941, with at least one of the older Do Y's already being overhauled.

None of the Do Y's played any part in the invasion of Yugoslavia in April 1941 and all four were captured by German forces. Both Do Y's were being overhauled and the two Do Ym bombers were parked in front of the State Aircraft Factory. Dornier documents dated 11 September state that all of the Do Y's were to be given to the Croats free of charge, but they must pay for any repairs. One of them was subsequently handed over to the Air Force of the Independent State of Croatia and was assigned to 9th Squadron in January 1942. It only made a few flights before it became a decoy at Sarajevo in mid-1944. The other three aircraft were cannibalized for spare parts and subsequently scrapped.

== Operators ==
Independent State of Croatia

- The Air Force of the Independent State of Croatia

Kingdom of Yugoslavia

- Royal Yugoslav Air Force

== Specifications (Do Y - 9K engines) ==
Data from Jane's all the World's Aircraft 1937

General characteristics

- Crew: 4
- Length: 18.2 m (59 ft 9 in)
- Wingspan: 26.82 m (88 ft 0 in)
- Height: 6.3 m (20 ft 8 in)
- Wing area: 108.8 m^{2} (1,171 sq ft)
- Empty weight: 5,700 kg (12,566 lb)
- Gross weight: 8,500 kg (18,739 lb)
- Fuel capacity: 2,090 L (550 US gal; 460 imp gal) fuel in two wing tanks; 210 L (55 US gal; 46 imp gal) oil in three tanks
- Powerplant: 3 × Gnome-Rhône 9Kers 9-cylinder air-cooled radial piston engines, 450 kW (600 hp) each at 4,050 m (13,290 ft)
- Propellers: 3-bladed metal propellers

Performance

- Maximum speed: 300 km/h (190 mph, 160 kn) at 4,000 m (13,000 ft)
- Cruise speed: 250 km/h (160 mph, 130 kn) at 4,000 m (13,000 ft)
- Landing speed: 105 km/h (65 mph; 57 kn)
- Range: 1,500 km (930 mi, 810 nmi)
- Service ceiling: 8,300 m (27,200 ft) service ceiling
- Absolute ceiling: 8,800 m (28,900 ft)
- Rate of climb: 2.7 m/s (530 ft/min)
- Time to altitude: 4,000 m (13,000 ft) in 12 minutes 30 seconds
- Wing loading: 78 kg/m^{2} (16 lb/sq ft)
- Power/mass: 0.15838 kW/kg (0.09634 hp/lb)

Armament

- Guns: 5 × machine guns in nose, dorsal and ventral positions
- Bombs: 12 × 100 kg (220 lb) bombs carried internally in the fuselage

== See also ==
Related lists

- List of Interwar military aircraft

== Bibliography ==
- Dornier GmbH (1985). Dornier: Die Chronik des ältesten deutschen Flugzeugwerks [Dornier: The Story of the Oldest German Aircraft Company] (in German). Friedrichshafen, Germany: Walter Biering GmbH. ISBN 3-925505-01-6.
- Nikolic, Djordie & Ognjevic, Akeksandar M. (2021). Dornier: The Yugoslav Saga 1926-2007. Lublin, Poland: Kagero Publishing. ISBN 978-83-66673-61-8.
- Ostric, Sime (June 2003). "Laid et lourde: le Dornier Do-Y en Yugoslavie (première partie)" [Ugly and Heavy: The Dornier Do-Y in Yugoslavia (first part)]. Avions: Toute l'aéronautique et son histoire (in French) (123): 50–60. ISSN 1243-8650.
- Ostric, Sime (August 2003). "Laid et lourde: le Dornier Do-Y en Yugoslavie (fin)" [Ugly and Heavy: The Dornier Do-Y in Yugoslavia (last part)]. Avions: Toute l'aéronautique et son histoire (in French) (125): 52–59. ISSN 1243-8650.
