= Dornier S-Ray 007 =

Two-seat amphibious aircraft concept

S-Ray 007
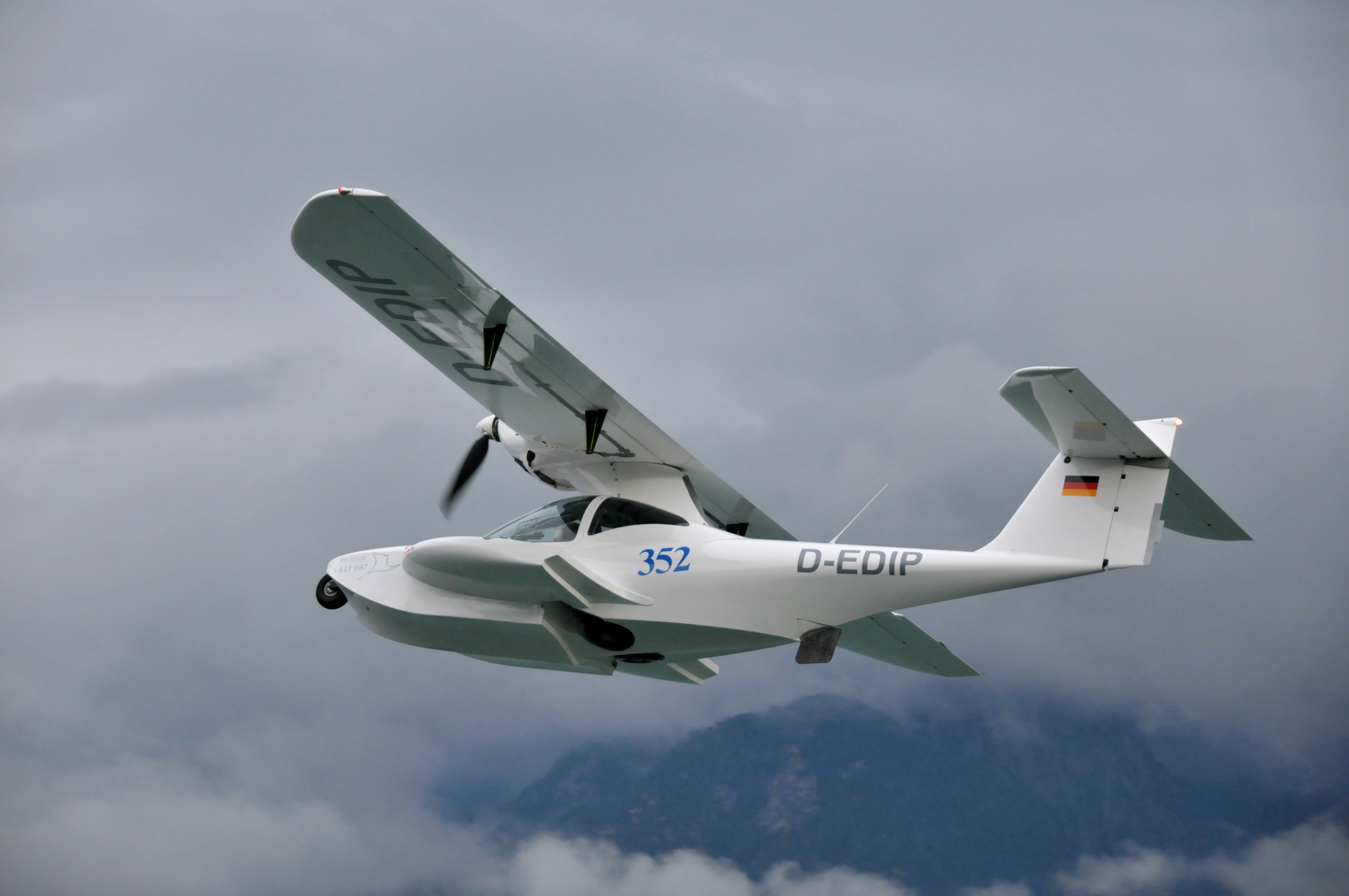

General information
- Type: Two-seat amphibious single-engine aircraft
- National origin: Germany
- Manufacturer: Dornier Technologie
- Designer: Iren Dornier

History
- First flight: 14 July 2007
- Developed from: Dornier Libelle

The Dornier S-Ray 007 is a two-seat amphibious aircraft concept designed by Dornier Technologie.

The concept is similar to that of the Dornier Libelle from the 1920s, and thus originally, the aircraft also carried the name Dornier Libelle. However, it was later changed to Dornier Stingray. Before the first aircraft could be built, the name was changed a third time to the Dornier S-Ray 007. The leader of the project is Iren Dornier, grandson of Claude Dornier and owner of Dornier Technologie.

The flying boat is a high-wing aircraft, featuring a one-piece wing which is connected with the centrally mounted Rotax 912S engine and propeller, on a stable aerodynamically-shaped central support pylon, to the fuselage. The S-Ray 007 is built from reinforced plastics with carbon fibre reinforcements, which makes the flying boat very resistant to salt water. The aircraft is equipped with retractable landing gear, and two 50 litre fuel tanks.

The maiden flight of the Dornier S-Ray 007 was held on 14 July 2007 at Friedrichshafen airport, and the aircraft was piloted by Gerhard Thalhammer.

== Specifications ==
Data from Iren Dornier S-Ray 007

General characteristics

- Crew: two
- Length: 6.75 m (22 ft 2 in)
- Wingspan: 9.0 m (29 ft 6 in)
- Height: 2.1 m (6 ft 11 in)
- Wing area: 12 m^{2} (130 sq ft)
- Empty weight: 510 kg (1,124 lb)
- Gross weight: 800 kg (1,764 lb)

Performance

- Cruise speed: 185 km/h (115 mph, 100 kn)
- Stall speed: 68 km/h (42 mph, 37 kn)
- Range: 1,300 km (810 mi, 700 nmi)

== See also ==
- Dornier Seastar
