= Dornier Do 12 =

Flying boat

Do 12
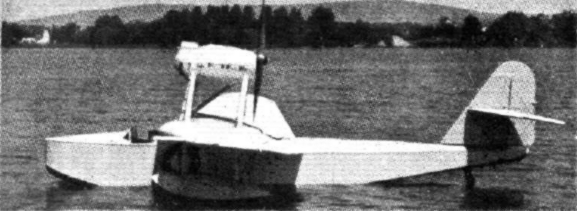

General information
- Type: Flying boat
- National origin: Germany
- Manufacturer: Dornier Flugzeugwerke

History
- First flight: 23 June 1932

The Dornier Do 12 Libelle III ("Dragonfly III") was the third of a line of small German flying boats of the 1930s. It started with the Dornier A Libelle I and the Dornier A Libelle II, though the Do 12 was not a continuation, but an entirely new aircraft.

The aircraft was amphibious and would carry three to four passengers. It was powered by a single Argus As 10 engine initially, then a Gnome-Rhône 5Ke Titan engine, mounted above the wing. It first flew in 1932 and went on to be used by the DFS to tow gliders.

== Design ==
The Do 12 was a high-wing monoplane, of usual Dornier all-metal construction, with a two-spar, trapezoidal wing, whose trailing edge was very strongly rounded at the root. The fuselage was of rectangular cross-section.

A storage area was in the nose, where equipment, including anchors, could be kept. Behind it, the open cockpit had two side-by-side seats, with optional dual controls. In the cabin, there were two more seats and a storage area, which could also be fitted with bunks for sleeping. Between the cockpit and cabin were nacelles which accommodated the retracted undercarriage wheels, a first for Dornier, which were lowered or raised manually by a crank. The engine sat on a stand high above the wing, alongside two fuel tanks, in pusher configuration.

From the first flight on 23 June 1932, and in the further course of testing, it was obvious that the Argus engine was underpowered, making takeoff distances substantially too long. However, financial difficulties in the company meant that fitting the stronger Gnome-Rhône Titan 5Ke took some time.

Father Paul Schulte, a missionary known as the "Flying Priest", used the Do 12 "D-INEZ" for many years and in his various books it plays an important role.

== Variants ==
Do 12
powered by a Gnome-Rhône Titan 5Ke five-cylinder radial engine
Do 12A
powered by an Argus As 10 inverted V-8 engine

== Specifications (Do 12) ==
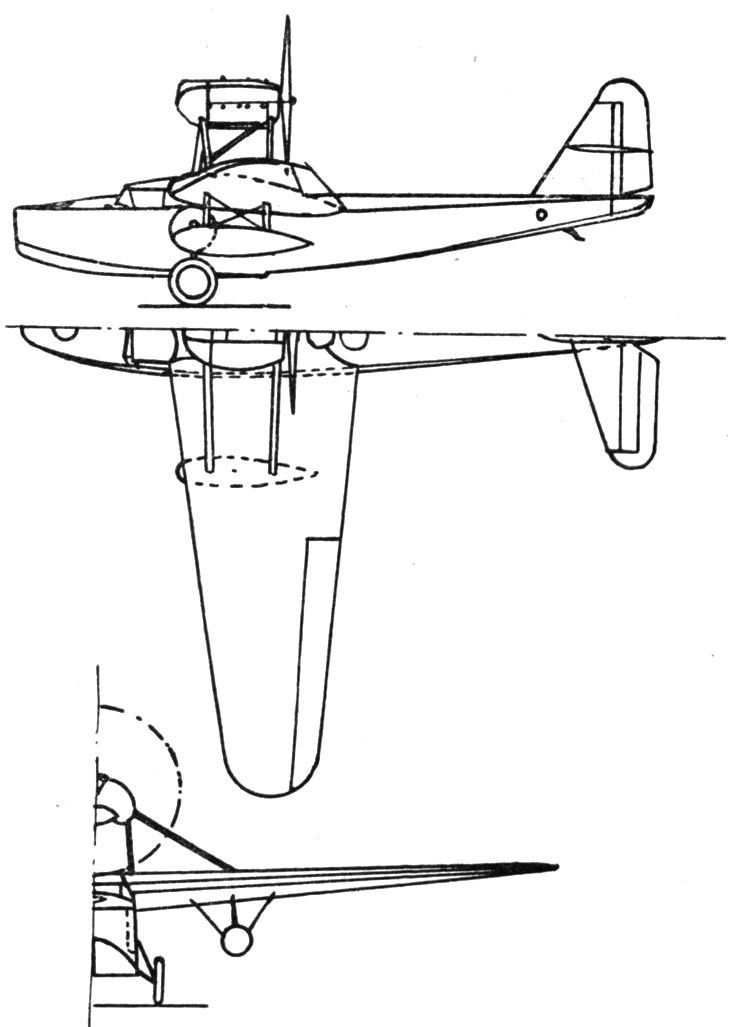
Dornier Libelle III 3 view from l'Aerophile magazine January 1933

Data from Die Deutsche Luftrüstung 1933–1945

General characteristics

- Crew: two
- Capacity: two passengers
- Length: 9.01 m (29 ft 7 in)
- Wingspan: 13 m (42 ft 8 in)
- Height: 3.87 m (12 ft 8 in)
- Wing area: 28 m^{2} (300 sq ft)
- Empty weight: 980 kg (2,161 lb)
- Gross weight: 1,400 kg (3,086 lb)
- Powerplant: 1 × Gnome-Rhône Titan 5Ke 5-cyl. air-cooled radial piston engine, 221 kW (296 hp)
  - or 1 × Argus As 10 inverted V-8 air-cooled piston engine rated at 168 kW (225 hp)

Performance

- Maximum speed: 210 km/h (130 mph, 110 kn)
- Cruise speed: 180 km/h (110 mph, 97 kn)
- Stall speed: 103 km/h (64 mph, 56 kn)
- Range: 600 km (370 mi, 320 nmi) (Titan)
  - (As 10) – 800 km (497 mi)
- Service ceiling: 5,100 m (16,700 ft) (Titan)
  - (As 10) 5,600 m (18,400 ft)
- Rate of climb: 4.25 m/s (840 ft/min) (Titan)
  - (As 10) – 3.9 m/s (770 ft/min)
- Time to altitude: (Titan) 1,000 m (3,300 ft) in 4 minutes
  - (AS 10) 1,000 m (3,300 ft) in 5 minutes
- Wing loading: 50 kg/m^{2} (10 lb/sq ft)

== See also ==
Related lists

- List of military aircraft of Germany
- List of RLM aircraft designations
- List of flying boats and floatplanes
