= Dornier Do S =

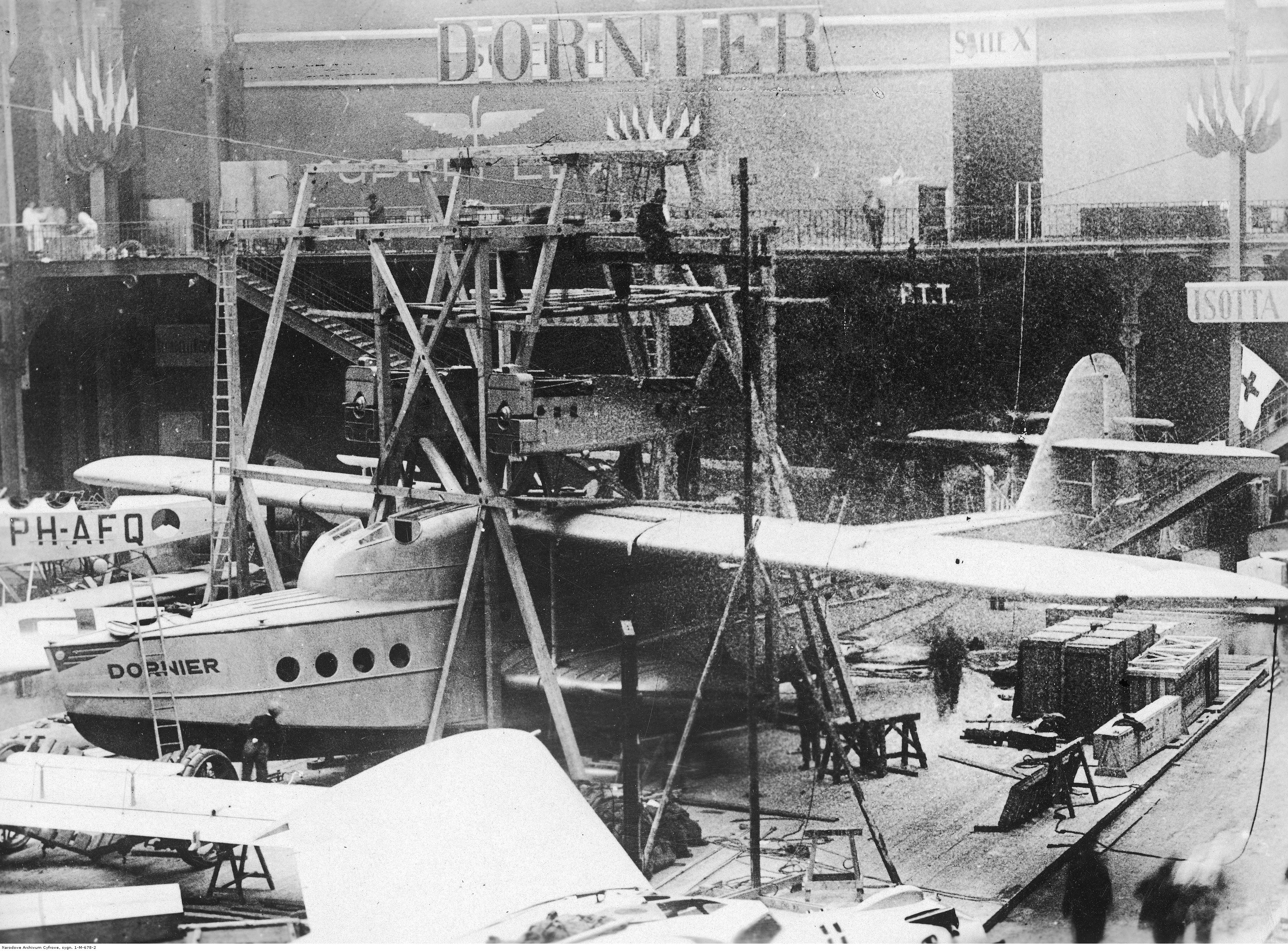

General information
- Type: Passenger flying boat
- National origin: Germany
- Manufacturer: Dornier Flugzeugwerke
- Number built: 1

History
- First flight: 23 September 1930

The Dornier Do S was a 22-passenger flying boat airliner flown in Germany in 1930.

== Design and development ==
The all-metal Dornier Do S was intended to replace the Dornier Do R 4 Superwal, a four-engined, 19-passenger flying boat flown four years earlier. Both were high-wing monoplanes but the Do S was bigger (about 7–8%) in both span and weight, and had a significantly improved hull which seated 22 passengers. A large increase in effective wing area, which included sponsons and an auxiliary winglet, decreased the wing loading by about 30% and the landing speed by 25 km/h (16 mph; 13 kn).

The main wing of the Dornier S was in three parts, with a central panel attached to the crew's compartment on top of the main fuselage, and two outer panels. It was rectangular in plan, with a chord of 8.8 m (28 ft 10 in), apart from slightly blunted tips. The wing was built around three duralumin trellis spars, with dural ribs and skin. The inner panel was supported by two vertical struts from the sponsons. On each side the main outer bracing was provided by a single strut from the inner sponson to the central spar of the outer panel, at about half-span. These were assisted by steel flying wires from below, between the forward and rear spars and the sponsons, and from above by a single wire from the raised engine mountings and their cross-bracing auxiliary wing, to the forward spar. High aspect ratio ailerons occupied all the trailing edge of the outer panels, aerodynamically balanced by small auxiliary surfaces mounted forward and well above the hinge line.

The lower part of the fuselage followed Dornier's usual practice, with a narrow-V cross-section forward changing to a flat bottom, with a deeper centre region, near the single step and a V-section aft ending with a water rudder. There were two passenger cabins, one seating twelve forward of a lobby accessed by a starboard side door and containing a cloakroom, toilet, library and medicine cabinet. Behind it was a second passenger compartment for ten, with a kitchen aft. At the stern the empennage was conventional, with a fin that had a swept leading edge and blunted top, carrying a rudder which reached down to the top of the fuselage. Its tailplane, with a plan similar to that of the wing, was braced from below by a pair of parallel struts on each side and was adjustable in flight. It carried elevators which were aerodynamically balanced in the same way as the ailerons.

The crew were housed in a separate structure above the cabin which also formed the central connection between wing and fuselage. It began well forward of the leading edge and ended just aft of the trailing edge. The pilot's open cockpit near the front had a pair of side-by-side seats with dual controls. Further aft, there were positions for a flight engineer, a navigator and a radio operator, one of whom could act as co-pilot.

The Do S was powered by four 347 kW (465 hp) Hispano-Suiza 12Lbr water-cooled V-12 engines, mounted above the wings in push-pull configuration pairs and driving four-bladed propellers. Each engine in a pair had a radiator occupying half the front of the rectangular section nacelle. Each pair was mounted on two V-struts and two wider-spread inverted V-struts to the forward and central spars. The upper engine mountings were braced together centrally by a narrow-chord structure which acted as an auxiliary wing as well as being part of the main wing bracing structure. With a span of almost 9 m (29 ft 6 in), it reached out beyond the engines.

== Operational history ==
The Do S's first flight was made on 23 September 1931 from the Bodensee. On 16 November 1931 it flew from Friedrichshafen in Germany to Paris for the 12th annual Salon (aero show), landing on the Seine at Suresnes but displayed indoors in Paris. It returned to Friedrichshafen in the new year in a series of short demonstration flights. Despite Dornier's efforts. no orders were placed and only one Do S was built. It was used as a hydrodynamic test vehicle until 1933, when it was transferred at the Ministry of Transport's request to the Deutsche Verkehrsfliegerschule (DVS) flying school at List auf Sylt. It was lost in the Baltic in 1935.

== Specifications ==
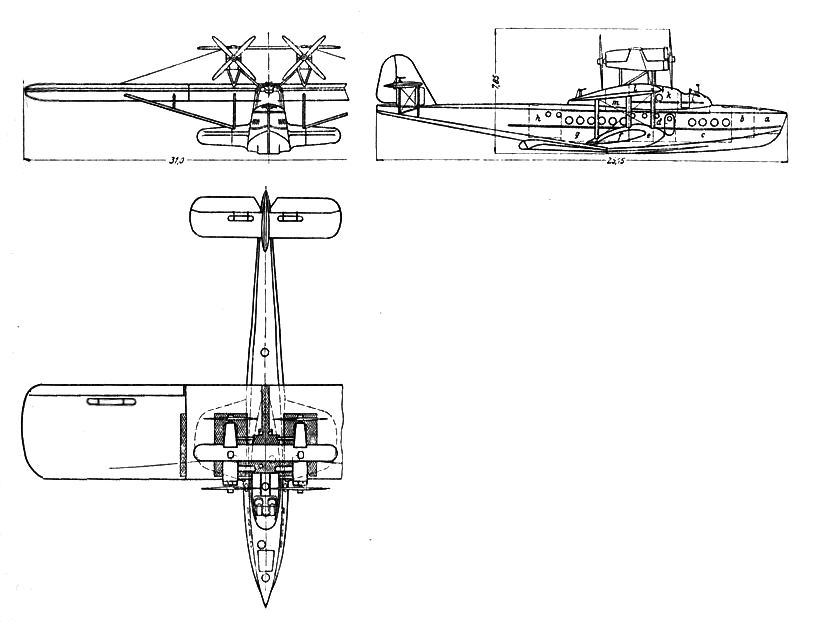
Dornier Do.S 3-view drawing from l'Aerophile May 1931

Data from Les Ailes, January 1931

General characteristics

- Crew: four; pilot, engineer, navigator and radio operator
- Capacity: 22 passengers
- Length: 25.75 m (84 ft 6 in)
- Wingspan: 31.00 m (101 ft 8 in)
- Height: 7.85 m (25 ft 9 in) (from keel to propeller tip)
- Wing area: 209 m^{2} (2,250 sq ft) including sponsons and the upper winglet
- Empty weight: 10,000 kg (22,046 lb) (a later source gives 9,100 kg (20,100 lb))
- Gross weight: 15,000 kg (33,069 lb)
- Fuel capacity: 3,500 L (770 imp gal; 920 US gal)
- Powerplant: 4 × Hispano-Suiza 12Lbr water-cooled V-12 engine, 470 kW (630 hp) each take-off, 347 kW (465 hp) continuous
- Propellers: 4-bladed wooden fixed pitch

Performance

- Cruise speed: 215 km/h (134 mph, 116 kn)
- Range: 1,000 km (620 mi, 540 nmi) with 22 passengers
- Service ceiling: 2,700 m (8,900 ft)
- Landing speed: 90 km/h (56 mph; 49 kn)
