= Dornier Do X =

1920s–1930s German flying boat

Do X
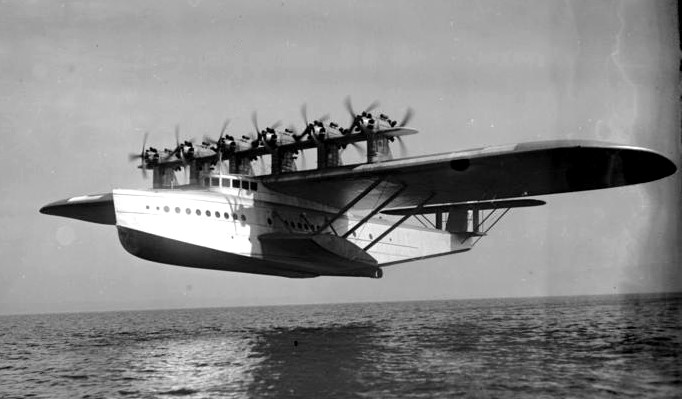

General information
- Type: airliner, flying boat
- Manufacturer: Dornier
- Designer: Claude Dornier
- Primary users: Regia Aeronautica Dornier Flugzeugwerke, Deutsche Luft Hansa
- Number built: 3

History
- Manufactured: 1929-1932
- Introduction date: 1929
- First flight: 12 July 1929
- Retired: 1937

The Dornier Do X was the largest, heaviest, and most powerful flying boat in the world when it was produced by the Dornier company of Germany in 1929. First conceived by Claude Dornier in 1924, planning started in late 1925 and after over 240,000 work-hours it was completed in June 1929.

During the years between the two World Wars, only the Soviet Tupolev ANT-20 Maksim Gorki landplane of a few years later was physically larger, but at 53 tonnes maximum takeoff weight it was not as heavy as the Do X's 56 tonnes.

The Do X was financed by the German Transport Ministry and in order to circumvent conditions of the Treaty of Versailles, which forbade any aircraft exceeding set speed and range limits to be built by Germany after World War I, a specially designed plant was built at Altenrhein, on the Swiss side of Lake Constance.

The type was popular with the public, but a lack of commercial interest and a number of non-fatal accidents prevented more than three examples from being built.

== Design ==
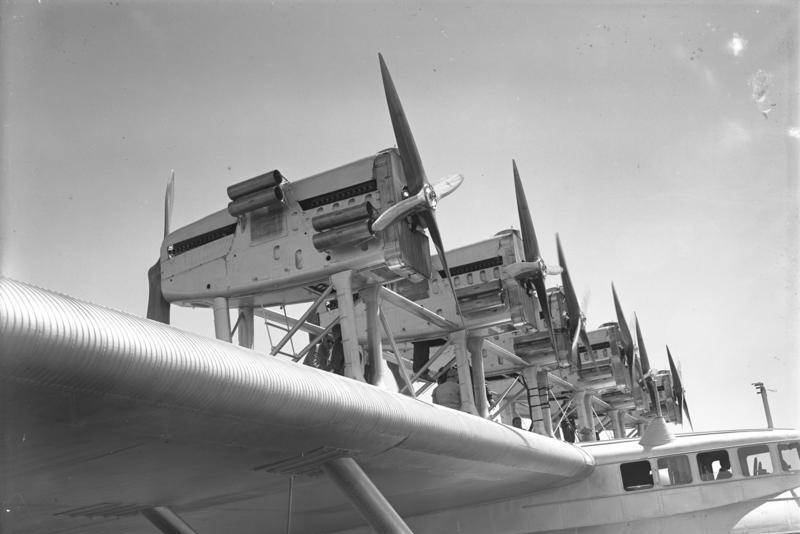
Engines on the wing

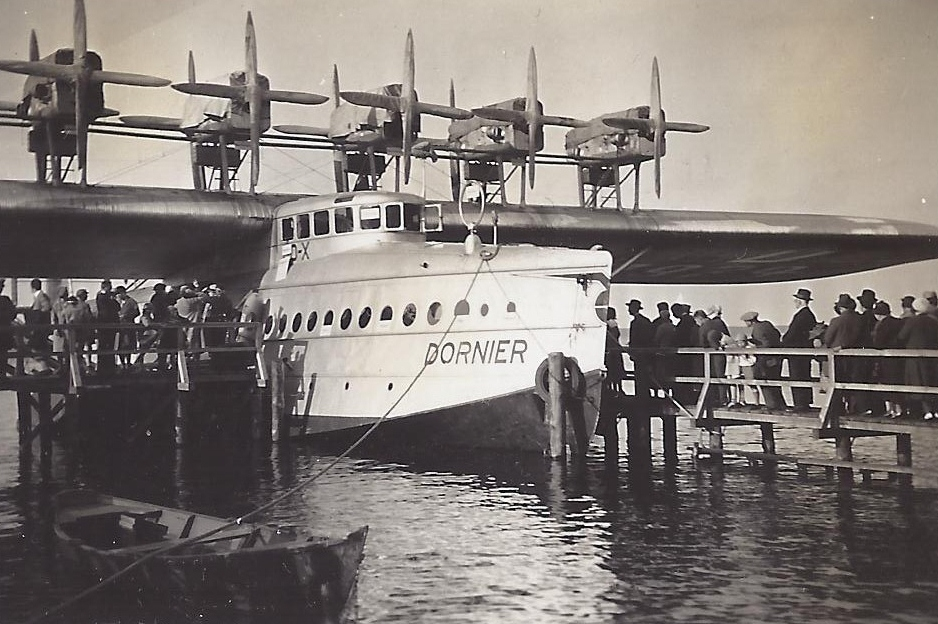
Do X on Lake Müggelsee, Berlin, May 1932

The Do X was a semi-cantilever monoplane. The Do X had an all-duralumin hull, with wings composed of a steel-reinforced duralumin framework covered in heavy linen fabric, covered with aluminium paint.

It was initially powered by twelve 391 kW (524 hp) Siemens-built Bristol Jupiter radial engines in tandem push-pull configuration mountings, with six tractor propellers and six pushers mounted on six strut-mounted nacelles above the wing. The nacelles were joined by an auxiliary wing to stabilise the mountings. The air-cooled Jupiter engines were prone to overheating and could barely lift the Do X to an altitude of 425 m (1,394 ft). The engines were managed by a flight engineer, who controlled the 12 throttles and monitored the 12 sets of gauges. The pilot would relay a request to the engineer to adjust the power setting, in a manner similar to the system used on maritime vessels, using an engine order telegraph. Many aspects of the aircraft echoed nautical arrangements of the time, including the flight deck, which bore a strong resemblance to the bridge of a vessel. After completing 103 flights in 1930, the Do X was refitted with 455 kW (610 hp) Curtiss V-1570 "Conqueror" water-cooled V-12 engines. These enabled it to reach an altitude of 500 m (1,600 ft), considered sufficient to safely cross the Atlantic. Dornier designed the flying boat to carry 66 passengers on long-distance flights or 100 passengers on short flights.

The luxurious passenger accommodation approached the standards of transatlantic liners. There were three decks. On the main deck was a smoking room with its own wet bar, a dining salon, and seating for the 66 passengers which could also be converted to sleeping berths for night flights. Aft of the passenger spaces was an all-electric galley, lavatories, and cargo hold. The cockpit, navigational office, engine control and radio rooms were on the upper deck. The lower deck held fuel tanks and nine watertight compartments, only seven of which were needed to provide full flotation. Similar to the later Boeing 314, the Do X lacked conventional wing floats, using sponsons (fuselage-mounted stub wings) to stabilize the craft on the water and also act as embarkation platforms for passengers.

Three Do Xs were constructed in total. The original operated by Dornier, and two other machines based on orders from Italy, namely the X2, named Umberto Maddalena (registered I-REDI), and X3, named Alessandro Guidoni (registered I-ABBN). The Italian variants were slightly larger and used a different powerplant and engine mounts. Dornier claimed the X2 was the largest aircraft in the world at that time. Each was powered by Fiat A-22R V12 water-cooled engines, with the six engine mounts being covered by a streamlined fairing.

A proposed improved version of the Do X designated the Dornier Do 20, in which the pylon-mounted engines were to be replaced by four pairs of 750 kW (1,000 hp) diesel engines in nacelles fared into the wing's leading edge and driving four propellers, was promoted in 1936, but never advanced beyond a design study.

== Operation ==
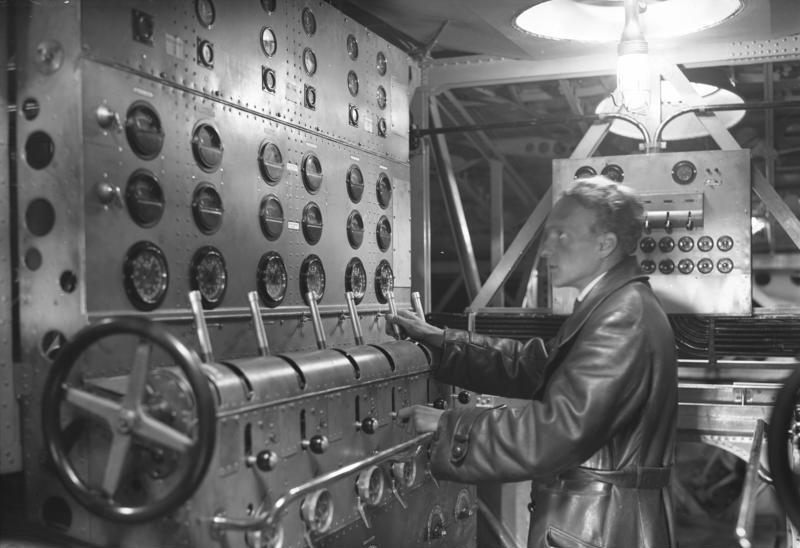
The engineer in the machine centre operated the throttles of the 12 engines

The Flugschiff ("flying ship"), as it was called, was launched for its first test flight on 12 July 1929, with a crew of 14. To satisfy skeptics, on its 70th test flight on 21 October there were 169 on board of which 150 were passengers (mostly production workers and their families, and a few journalists), ten were aircrew and nine were stowaways. The flight set a new world record for the number of people carried on a single flight, a record that would stand for 20 years. After a takeoff run of 50 seconds the Do X slowly climbed to an altitude of 200 m (660 ft). Passengers were asked to crowd together on one side or the other to help make turns. It flew for 40 minutes Flug Revue claims it was the 42nd flight and lasted 53 minutes, and a historical film shows "fliegt mit 170 personen") at a maximum speed of 170 km/h (110 mph) before landing on Lake Constance.

To introduce the airliner to the potential United States market the Do X took off from Friedrichshafen, Germany, on 3 November 1930, under the command of Friedrich Christiansen for a transatlantic test flight to New York. The route took the Do X to the Netherlands, the United Kingdom, France, Spain, and Portugal. The journey was interrupted at Lisbon on 29 November, when a tarpaulin made contact with a hot exhaust pipe and started a fire that consumed most of the left wing. After sitting in Lisbon harbour for six weeks while new parts were fabricated and the damage repaired, the flying boat continued with several further mishaps and delays along the Western coast of Africa and by 5 June 1931 had reached the islands of Cape Verde, from which it crossed the ocean to Natal in Brazil.

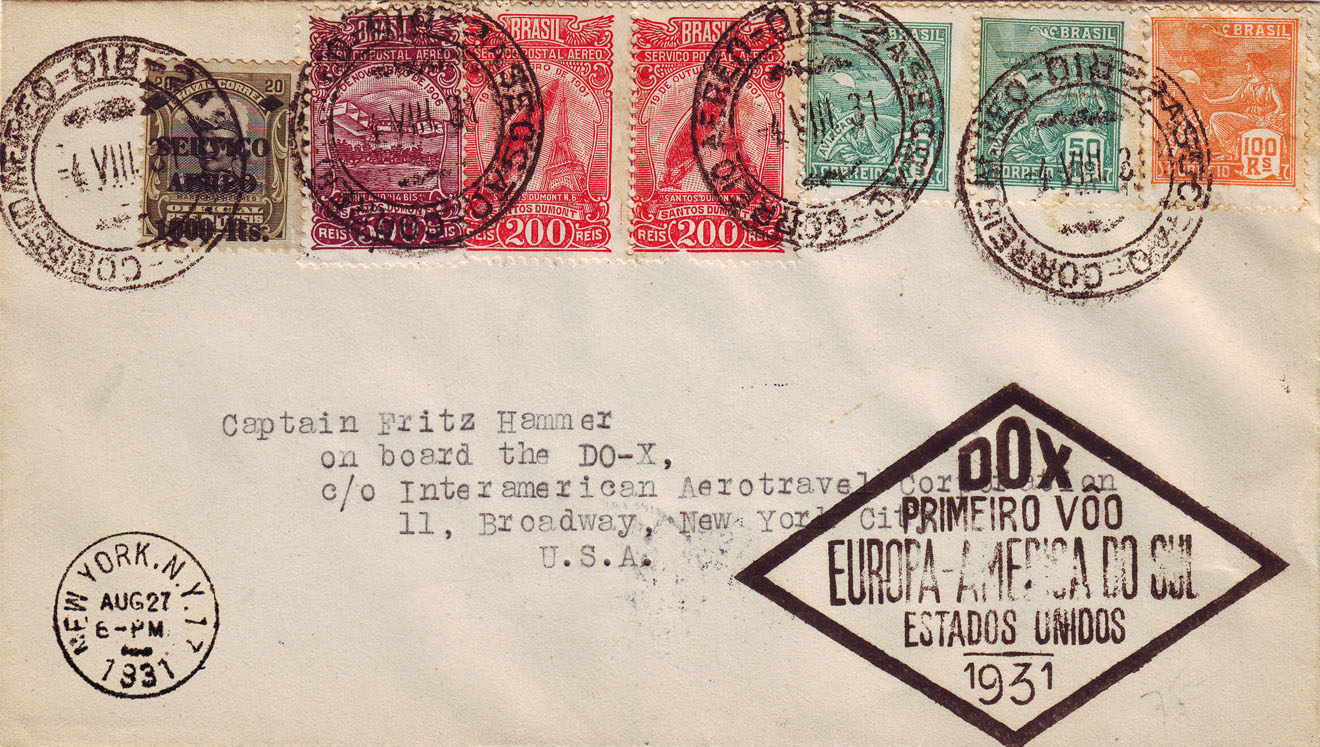
Cover carried from Rio de Janeiro to New York on the Do X, August 5–27, 1931

The flight continued north via San Juan to the United States, reaching New York on 27 August 1931, almost ten months after departing Friedrichshafen. The Do X and crew spent the next nine months there as its engines were overhauled, and thousands of sightseers made the trip to Glenn Curtiss Airport (now LaGuardia) for sightseeing tours. The Great Depression dashed Dornier's marketing plans for the Do X, and it departed from New York on 21 May 1932 via Newfoundland and the Azores to Müggelsee, Berlin, where it arrived on 24 May and was met by a cheering crowd of 200,000.

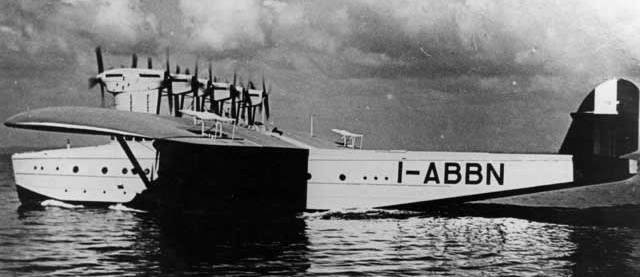
Italy's Do X3 Alessandro Guidoni, one of the three Do Xs built

The Do X2 entered service in August 1931, and the X3 followed in May 1932. Both were initially based at the seaplane station at La Spezia, on the Ligurian Sea, and reassigned to various other bases during their service. Both orders originated with SANA, then the Italian state airline, but were requisitioned and used by the Italian Air Force primarily for prestige flights and public spectacles. After plans for a first-class passenger service (Genoa–Gibraltar) were deemed unfeasible, the X2 and X3 were used for officer training cruises, aeronaval manoeuvres, and publicity flights.

In April 1936, a plan was floated for a trans-Atlantic service between Berlin and New York via Lisbon and Charleston, South Carolina, with intermediate stops in the Azores and Bermuda, but it never came to pass.

== Final fates ==
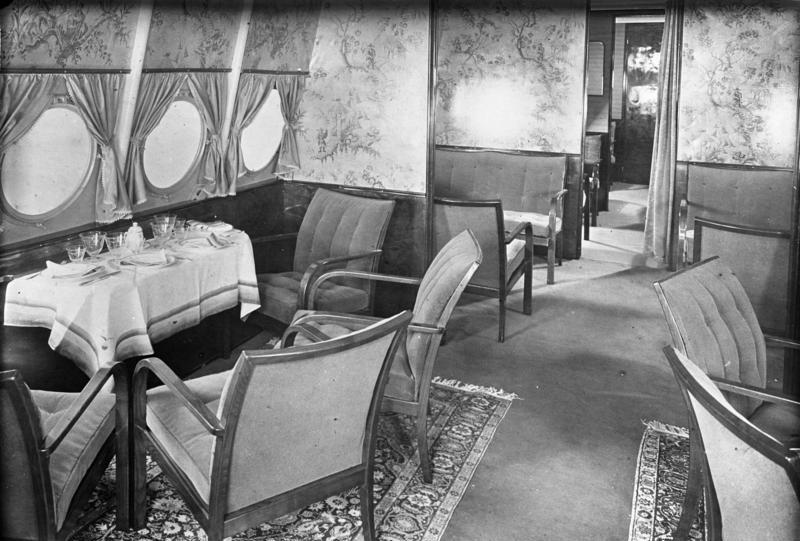
Dining room

Germany's original Do X was turned over to Deutsche Luft Hansa, the German national airline, after the financially strapped Dornier company could no longer operate it. After a successful 1932 tour of German coastal cities, Luft Hansa planned a Do X flight to Vienna, Budapest, and Istanbul for 1933. The voyage ended after nine days when the flying boat's tail section tore off during a botched, overly-steep landing on a reservoir lake near Passau. While the accident was successfully covered up, the Do X was out of service for three years, during which time it changed hands several times before reappearing in 1936 in Berlin, Hormann writes "Am 5.September 1933 flog Chefeinflieger Wagner die DO-X zum Bodensee zurück. Mit dem Fiasko von Passau begann für DO-X der Weg ins Museum." ("On 5 September 1933 chief test pilot Wagner flew the DO X back to the Bodensee (Lake Constance). The Passau fiasco started the DO X's trip to the museum.") The Do X then became the centerpiece of Germany's new aviation museum Deutsche Luftfahrt-Sammlung at Lehrter Bahnhof.

The Do X remained an exhibit until being destroyed during World War II in a Royal Air Force air raid on the night of 23–24 November 1943. Fragments of the torn-off tail section are displayed at the Dornier Museum in Friedrichshafen. While never a commercial success, the Dornier Do X was the largest heavier-than-air aircraft of its time, and demonstrated the potential for an international passenger air service.

In an accident identical to that of Lufthansa's Do X1a, the Italian Do X2 lost its tail section in a botched landing only one month later. After scaling back flights and crew complements during 1934, they were mothballed at Marina di Pisa in 1935, and broken up for scrap in 1937.

== Operators ==
Germany

- Dornier Flugzeugwerke
- Deutsche Luft Hansa

Italy

- Regia Aeronautica
- SANA (state airline)

== Replica project ==
A group of enthusiasts, led by former Dornier employee Peter Kielhorn, is working to construct a static (non-flying) replica of the Dornier Do X. The goal is to have the digital Do X completed by 2026 and the full-scale, buoyant (but non-flying) replica ready by 2029, the 100th anniversary of the original's first test flight.

== Specifications (Do X1a) ==
Dornier Do X 3-view

Data from Jane's all the World's Aircraft 1929, Flight 21 February 1930 : The Dornier Do. X First Authentic Data and Particulars

General characteristics

- Crew: 10-14
- Capacity: 66-100 passengers
- Length: 40.05 m (131 ft 5 in)
- Wingspan: 47.8 m (156 ft 10 in)
- Lower wingspan: 10 m (32 ft 10 in) (sponsons)
- Width: 4.8 m (15 ft 9 in) maximum hull beam
- Height: 10.25 m (33 ft 8 in)
- Wing area: 486.2 m^{2} (5,233 sq ft)
- Empty weight: 28,000 kg (61,729 lb)
- Gross weight: 49,000 kg (108,027 lb)
- Fuel capacity: 16,000 L (4,200 US gal; 3,500 imp gal) in 8 tanks in hull and wings + optional 8,600 L (2,300 US gal; 1,900 imp gal)
- Oil capacity: 3,600 L (950 US gal; 790 imp gal) in six nacelle tanks with 1,300 L (340 US gal; 290 imp gal) in a hull tank for in-flight replenishment
- Powerplant: 12 × Curtiss V-1570 12-cylinder Liquid-cooled aircraft piston engines, 450 kW (600 hp) each
- Propellers: 4-bladed fixed-pitch wooden propellers

Performance

- Maximum speed: 242 km/h (150 mph, 131 kn)
- Cruise speed: 170 km/h (110 mph, 92 kn)
- Range: 1,700 km (1,100 mi, 920 nmi)
- Service ceiling: 3,200 m (10,500 ft)
- Wing loading: 105 kg/m^{2} (22 lb/sq ft)
- Power/mass: 17.2 lb/hp (10.5 kg/kW)

== See also ==
- Short Sarafand - largest biplane flying boat

Aircraft of comparable role, configuration, and era

- Blackburn Sydney
- Latécoère 521

Related lists

- List of flying boats and floatplanes
- List of large aircraft
