= Dornier Do 29 (1934) =

1930s experimental aircraft by Dornier

Do 29

General information
- Type: Zerstörer ("Destroyer")
- Manufacturer: Dornier
- Status: Design only
- Primary user: Luftwaffe

History
- Developed from: Dornier Do 17

The Dornier Do 29 was a proposed Zerstörer, or heavy fighter, designed by Dornier as a competitor to the Messerschmitt Bf 110.

The design answered the Reich Air Ministry requirement in autumn 1934 for a heavy fighter. Highly derivative of the earlier Do 17, the design was rejected before the prototype stage, and work stopped in 1936.

== Specifications (estimated) ==
Data from Luftwaffe secret projects : ground attack & special purpose aircraft

General characteristics

- Crew: 1
- Length: 15.35 m (50 ft 4 in)
- Wingspan: 17.56 m (57 ft 7 in)
- Height: 4.6 m (15 ft 1 in)
- Wing area: 55 m^{2} (590 sq ft)
- Gross weight: 4,270 kg (9,414 lb)
- Powerplant: 1 × Bramo 323A 9-cylinder air-cooled radial piston engines, 628 kW (842 hp) LH rotation
- Powerplant: 1 × Bramo 323B 9-cylinder air-cooled radial piston engines, 628 kW (842 hp) RH rotation
- Propellers: 3-bladed variable-pitch propellers

Performance

- Maximum speed: 460 km/h (290 mph, 250 kn)

Armament

- Guns: 6 × 7.92 mm (.312 in) MG 17 machine guns in nose + 1 × 7.92 (.312 in) MG 15 machine gun dorsal

== See also ==
Related development

- Dornier Do 17

Aircraft of comparable role, configuration, and era

- Focke-Wulf Fw 57
- Henschel Hs 124
- Messerschmitt Bf 110

Related lists

- List of military aircraft of Germany
