= Lindauer Dornier =

German textile machinery manufacturer

- Type: Private
- Industry: Textile Machinery
- Predecessor: Dornier Flugzeugwerke
- Founded: 1950; 76 years ago
- Founder: Peter Dornier
- Headquarters: Rickenbacher Str. 119, 88131, Lindau, Germany
- Key people: Andreas Kückelmann (CEO); Franz-Peter Matheis (CFO); Dr. Holger Niemeier (CTO)
- Number of employees: ~1000
- Website: https://www.lindauerdornier.com/en/

Lindauer DORNIER GmbH is a family-owned textile machinery manufacturer located in Lindau, Germany. It was spun off from Dornier GmbH in 1985.
