= Project 621 =

Project 621 was a project by the Dornier company with the intention of producing a sounding rocket with liquid-fuel propulsion. It was to use a paraglider system to return safely to earth for later re-use. It had a wet mass of 240 kg (520 lb) and a dry mass of 74 kg. The rocket itself was never launched.

The rocket of the project was supposed to reach an apogee of eighty kilometers, and then return from a height of forty kilometers, spiraling to the ground. In 1965, multiple drop tests of the paraglider system on the rocket test area in Salto di Quirra in Sardinia was performed.

The project was halted in 1966, after large problems occurred regarding the choice of a suitable wing material (textile wings could not handle the loads, while wings made of high-grade steel could not withstand the airflow without major problems).
