= Dornier Seastar =

Flying boat, first flown 1984

Seastar
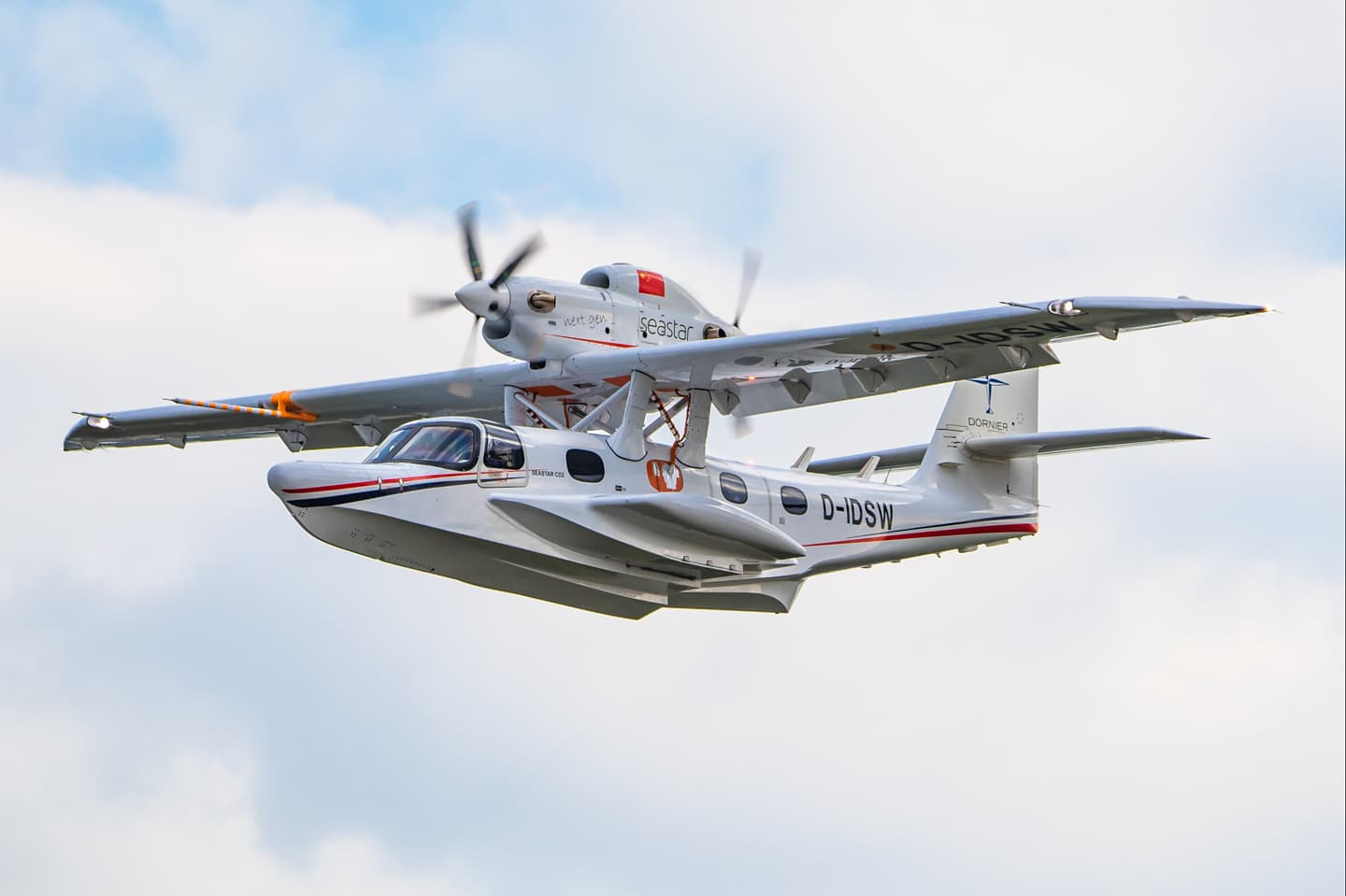

General information
- Type: Utility amphibian
- National origin: Germany
- Manufacturer: Dornier Seawings
- Designer: Claudius Dornier Jr
- Number built: 4 (3 CD-2) (1 prototype)

History
- First flight: 17 August 1984

The Dornier Seastar is a turboprop-powered amphibious aircraft built largely of composite materials. Developed by Claudius Dornier Jr of Germany, it first flew in 1984. The design is owned by Claudius Jr's son, Conrado, who founded Dornier Seawings AG (now Dornier Seawings) to continue work on the project after two previous firms, Claudius Dornier Aircraft and Dornier Composite Aircraft, both went into bankruptcy. Development of the aircraft was put on hold without any production Seastars being completed in 1991.

Multiple attempts to put the Seastar into production, often as a joint venture with other aerospace companies, were made throughout the 1990s and early 2000s. However securing the necessary financing to proceed to the manufacturing phase proved challenging. After several false starts, in October 2009, Dornier Seawings announced that it was formally launching manufacturing of the type, although no aircraft were actually built. In November 2018 the company received US$170 million in funding from its Chinese backers to construct a manufacturing facility and one prototype for flight, with production to follow in 2021.

== Development ==
=== Origins ===
The first prototype, a proof-of-concept aircraft, using the metal wings from a Dornier Do 28 and with large struts bracing the wing to the sponsons, conducted its maiden flight from Hamburg on 17 August 1984. A second prototype, which was more representative of the definitive design, featured several alterations; these included the adoption of a new composite wing, which connected with a set of cabane struts to the fuselage only, and was a larger aircraft overall. On 24 April 1987, the second prototype made its first flight from Oberpfaffenhofen. Development work on the project came to a close in 1991. A total of three aircraft had been produced at this point. In 1990, a European certificate of airworthiness was received for the type; in 1991, American airworthiness was also granted to the Seastar.

During the 1990s, the programme encountered severe organisational issues, including a lack of funding and backers who subsequently withdrew their participation. In November 1989, the company behind the Seastar, Claudius Dornier Aircraft, filed for bankruptcy, amid claims that the German government had failed to support the project. Prior to this, more than 50 options and letters of intent had been received for the type. In 1990, Dornier Composite Aircraft acquired the Seastar program, but this firm was also bankrupt within two years. As a result, a new company, Dornier Seastar, was formed to complete the aircraft's development and to produce the type, and began to seek partnerships with Asian companies to achieve this.

In 1993, Dornier Seastar and a consortium of Malaysian investors signed a joint venture agreement, under which assembly of the Seastar was envisioned to take place at a factory in Malaysia within the following year. However, in July 1995, a company spokesperson stated that Dornier Seastar's Malaysian subsidiary would be shelved until further notice, due a lack of capital investment; it has been allegedly that investors were concerned about the technical and financial viability of the project, such as the acquisition of internationally recognised production certification in Malaysia. By the time of the withdrawal, all of the manufacturing tools, moulds and jigs to produce that aircraft had already been transferred to Penang, Malaysia, along with a prototype aircraft for sales demonstration purposes at Subang Airport, Selangor.

=== Seeking partners ===
Following the collapse of the Malaysian joint venture, Dornier Seastar promptly set about attracting new investors to finance the program into the manufacturing phase. While the company focused its search on the Asian market, representatives stated that they were considering relocating production of the type to another country; Dornier Seastar also dismissed claims that a further $100 million were required to complete development of the aircraft's design. In early 1998, Dornier Seastar proposed the formation of a partnership with Hindustan Aeronautics (HAL), with the goal of producing the type as a joint venture. HAL confirmed that it was examining the viability for the Seastar in the Indian market.

By 2003, one of the two Seastar prototypes had been restored and received public transport certification in December of that year. In February 2004, the company stated that, in addition to seeking investment, it had been evaluating potential manufacturing sites in Europe and Asia prior to initiating a planned development phase later that year. It was said that feasibility studies and market analysis indicated that there was a global demand for around 250 such aircraft over the next ten years; furthermore, that it was proposing three different versions of the aircraft, each one for a different market segment: A surveillance variant for government agencies, a 12-seat regional airliner configuration aimed at charter operators, and a six-seat layout that was suited to VIP customers. In August 2006, there were claims made that the project was close to being relaunched with backing from firms in Singapore and Abu Dhabi, the latter being contingent upon the Seastar being manufactured in Abu Dhabi.

In October 2008, the company announced its intentions to produce the Seastar in the US, in part due to favourable currency exchange rates. Fabrication was to be outsourced to other companies, and was intended to use mainly American suppliers. The firm viewed the aircraft as having a niche role among private owners, airlines, and search and rescue operators. Dornier Seawings stated that it was seeking an additional $150 million to bring the type into mass production; it was also said that, in the event of 25 or more sales being secured, the Seastar could be in production as early as March 2009. In March 2009, the firm stated that it was pushing back its planned launch to the third quarter of that year, attributing this to the effects of the Great Recession, but remained optimistic about market demand for the type; it was also said that Dornier required only an additional $65 million, rather than the $150 million figure given in an earlier business plan, to establish full production status and to begin manufacturing work.

=== Production ===
In October 2009, Dornier Seaplane announced that it would launch production of the Seastar. According to Dornier Seaplane chief executive Joe Walker, the aircraft had been well received by a variety of public and private operators, and had received more than 25 letters of intent to procure the Seastar; he also stated that 2010 would be dedicated to selecting a final assembly site and major suppliers for the aircraft's manufacturing, and the first aircraft was then scheduled to be rolled out by the end of 2011.

In May 2010, Dornier Seaplane announced that it would build the Seastar in Saint-Jean-sur-Richelieu, about half an hour away from Montreal, Quebec, Canada. The site was picked due to the strength of the local supply chain and presence of skilled aerospace workers, as well as its proximity to Lake Champlain for flight operations. At this point, the company aimed to deliver their first production aircraft in 2012; production was projected to rise from a single aircraft in 2012, to six in 2013 and to 12 in 2014; dependent on demand, as many as 50 Seastars per year could eventually be built.

=== Wuxi acquisition ===
In 2013, the Seastar was acquired by Chinese companies Wuxi Communications Industry and Wuxi Industrial Development with the Dornier family retaining a minority stake. The company became a joint venture with these two state-owned companies, and plans to produce the aircraft in two locations, with one site in Oberpfaffenhofen, Germany and another in Wuxi, China.

In January 2016, Dornier Seaplane announced that Seastar airframes would be built by Diamond Aircraft Industries. In February 2016, Dornier launched the improved CD2. The first new-generation Seastar rolled out on 18 August 2017 in Oberpfaffenhoffen and is prepared for its first flight in the first half of 2019, for a 2020 type certification. It includes a redesigned and upgraded interior, Honeywell Primus avionics, a stern thruster, new Sumitomo corrosion-resistant landing gear, hydraulic electrically steerable nose gear, five-blade composite propellers and Pratt & Whitney Canada engine. By November 2018, the Chinese shareholders invested €150 million to develop and produce the CD2, to construct a new facility in Wuxi and to expand its Oberpfaffenhofen base.

It first flew on 28 March 2020.

== Design ==
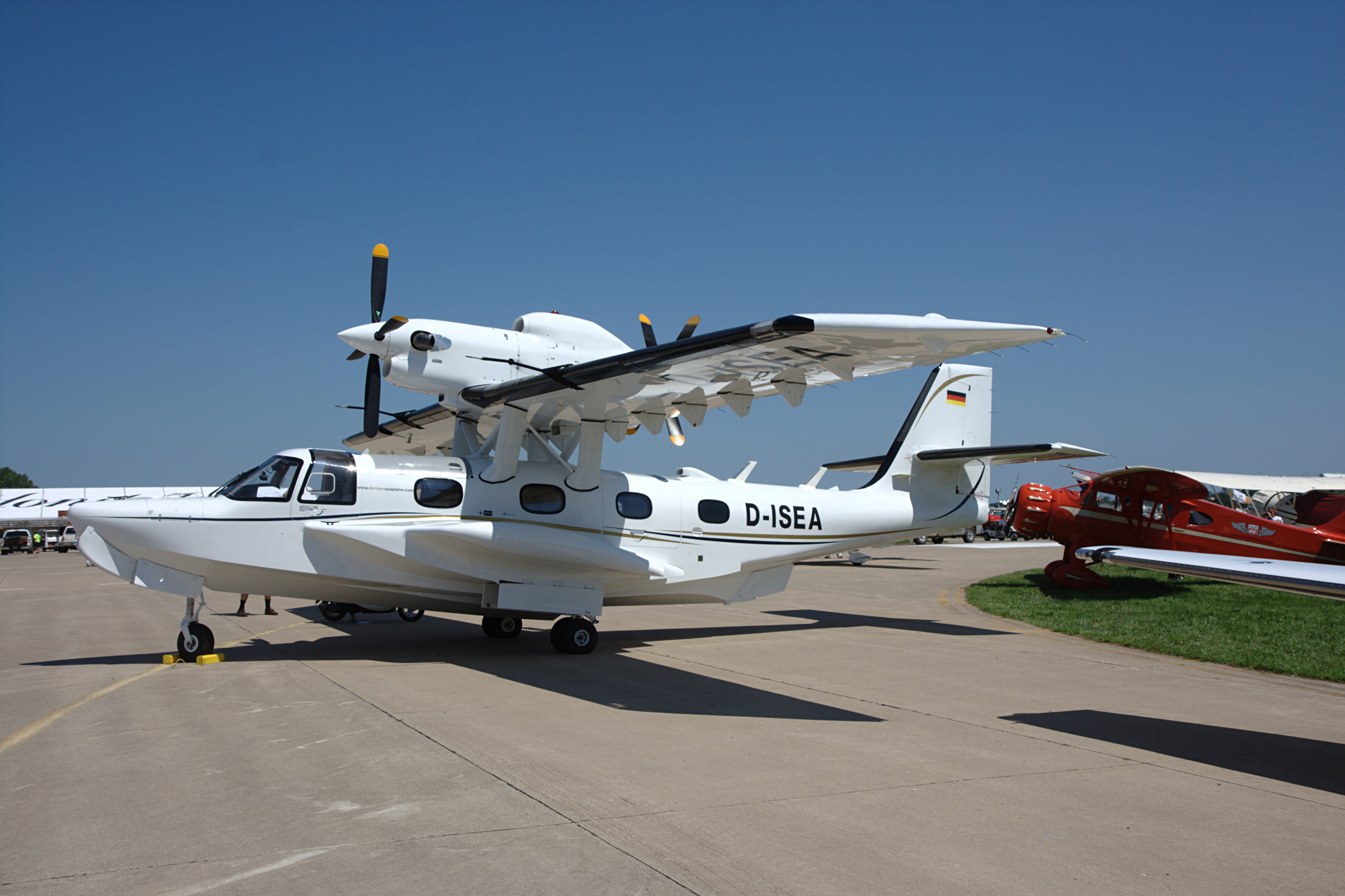
Seastar, 2010

The Dornier Seastar is a parasol wing flying boat, powered by a pair of Pratt & Whitney Canada PT6A-112 engines, mounted in a single nacelle over the wings in a push-pull configuration. In general layout, it strongly resembles both the innovative Dornier Do J Wal all-metal monoplane flying boat of the 1920s, of which over 250 examples were built, and its direct successor, the larger Dornier Do 18 of the 1930s. Locating both of the engines in the center of the wing enables the weight of the engines to be more effective in reducing any induced rolling motions; it also protects the engines from water spray, reducing corrosion, and eliminates asymmetric thrust when operating.

The Seastar's fuselage is composed of a fiberglass composite material, which is corrosion-proof as well as being less prone to leaks in comparison to rivetted metal hull counterparts. Unlike typical floatplanes, which are often conversions of land-based aircraft, the Seastar has a low vertical center of gravity, achieved in part by carrying all of its fuel within its sponsons instead of the wings. The sponsons, which provide stability while submerged on the water, are shaped to break surface tension and to generate considerable lift during the acceleration performed during takeoff; they also accommodate the main landing gear. Other flying boats often retract the landing gear into the hull instead. The landing gear can be optionally removed and reinstalled when needed; a special 'water mode' for the landing gear is also present which prevents their deployment during a water-based landing.

The hull of the Seastar features complex angling and shaping, as the result of extensive water tank testing. Pilots exit and enter the Seastar through a single door on the left-hand side of the aircraft from the sponson, and passengers board via a separate hatch located aft of the wing, also stepping from the sponson. This approach enables the aircraft to close to a relatively short distance from docks or boats for boarding purposes. The cabin can house up to 12 passengers, in addition to the crew in high-density seating, or can alternatively accommodate six-nine passengers in more spacious configurations; an aft baggage compartment is also present.

A series of improvements have been projected for the aircraft, such as the integration of an autopilot to enable single-pilot operations. Other prospective improvements include the adoption of a glass cockpit, deicing equipment, and air conditioning systems. Early production aircraft are intended to be compatible with the retrofitting of these improvements later on. According to Dornier Seawings, for surveillance missions the Seastar's flight endurance can be extended to around 11 flight hours by cruising on only a single engine. It is also claimed that the Seastar is one of the fastest flying boats on the market.

== Variants ==
Seastar CD-2

Orca
Proposed 2019 maritime patrol variant for government customers in the security, search and rescue, and environmental monitoring roles.

== Specifications (Seastar CD-2) ==
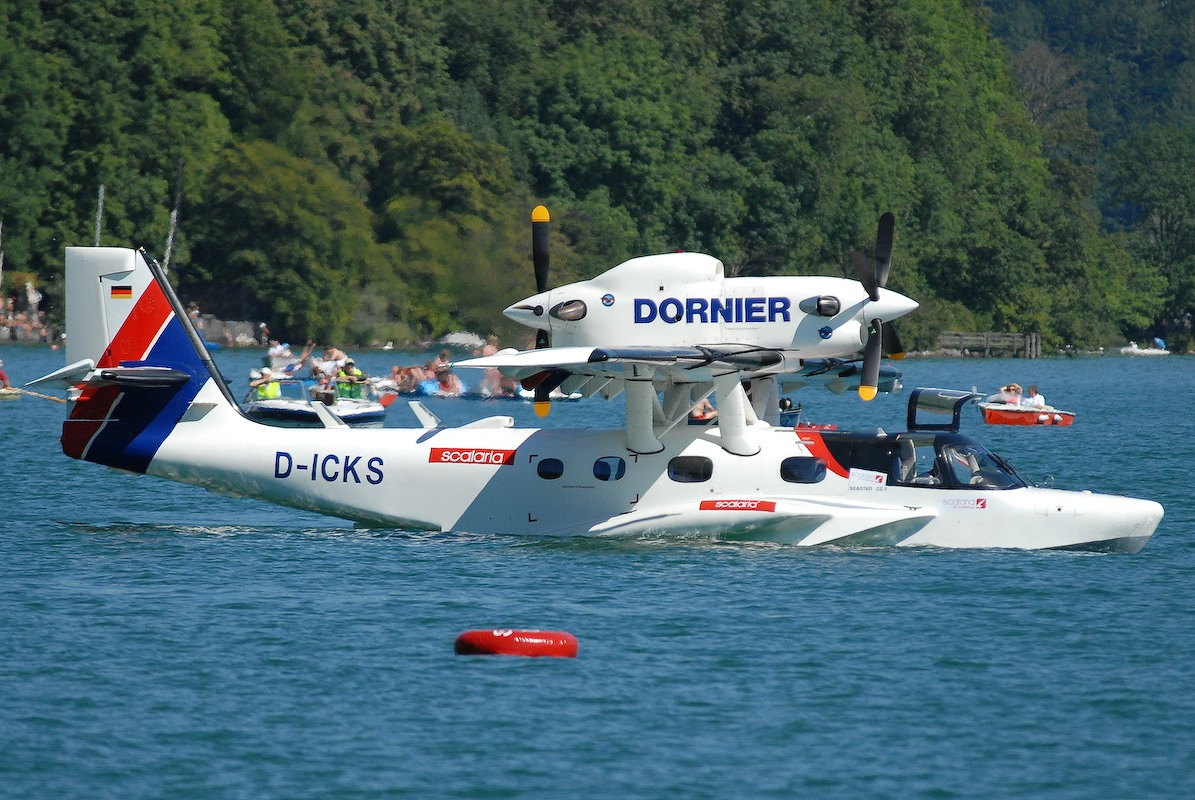
The Dornier Seastar on the Wolfgangsee in Austria

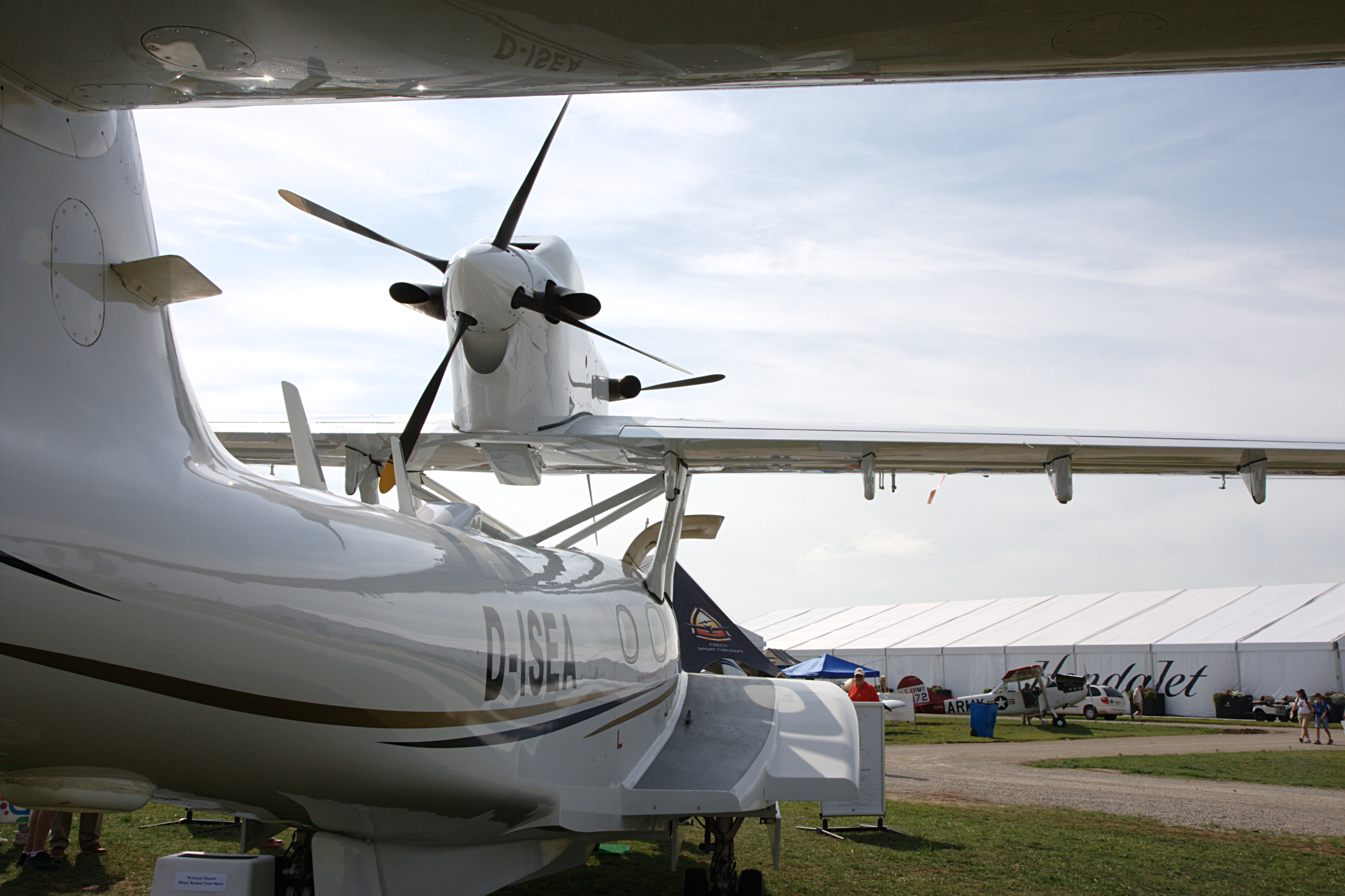
Rear view of a Seastar

Data from EASA TCDS Dornier Seawings

General characteristics

- Crew: one
- Capacity: 12
- Length: 12.70 m (41 ft 8 in)
- Wingspan: 17.74 m (58 ft 2 in)
- Height: 4.83 m (15 ft 10 in)
- Wing area: 30.6 m^{2} (329 sq ft)
- Empty weight: 2,900 kg (6,393 lb)
- Max takeoff weight: 4,600 kg (10,141 lb)
- Fuel capacity: 1387 kg (3056 lb)
- Powerplant: 2 × Pratt & Whitney Canada PT6A-112/A135A turboprop, 478 kW (650 shp) each
- Propellers: 4-bladed McCauley 4HFR34C760/95DA (Five-blade MT-Propellers on new Gen), 2.4 m (7 ft 10 in) diameter front, 2.35m aft

Performance

- Cruise speed: 330 km/h (210 mph, 180 kn)
- Stall speed: 120 km/h (75 mph, 65 kn) flaps 40°
- Never exceed speed: 417 km/h (259 mph, 225 kn)
- Service ceiling: 4,500 m (14,800 ft)
- Wing loading: 2,900 kg/m^{2} (590 lb/sq ft)

Avionics
(New Version only) Full Honeywell Primus Epic 2.0 glass cockpit (all-digital displays, autopilot, modern navigation).

== See also ==
Aircraft of comparable role, configuration, and era

- Dornier Do 18
- Dornier S-Ray 007

Related lists

- List of flying boats and floatplanes
