= Dornier Do K =

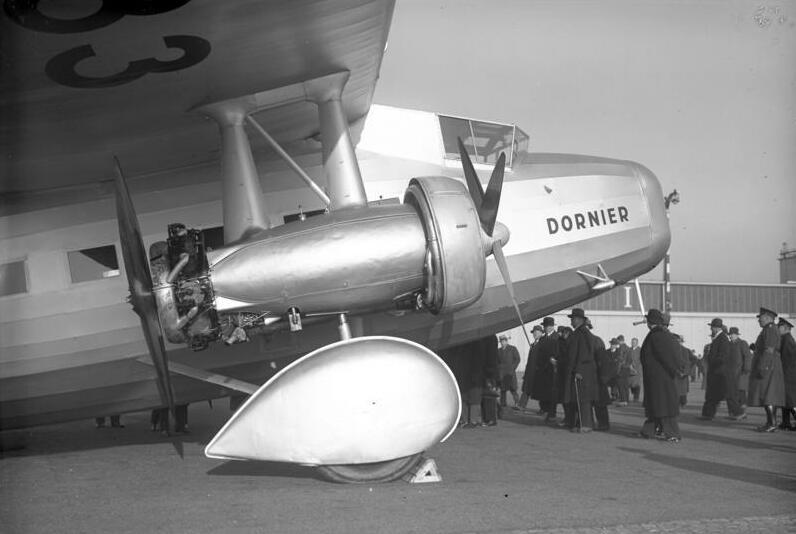
- Do K3

General information
- Type: Airliner
- National origin: Germany
- Manufacturer: Dornier
- Designer: Claude Dornier
- Number built: 3

History
- First flight: 7 May 1929 (Do K1)

The Dornier Do K was a German commercial passenger and freight monoplane, designed by Claude Dornier and built by Dornier Flugzeugwerke. Only three prototypes of different designs were built and the type was not a commercial success.

== Design and development ==
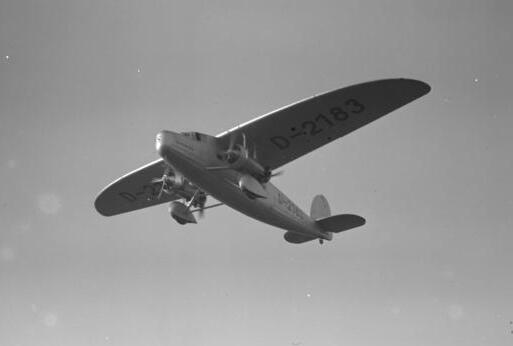
Do K3

=== Do K1 ===
The first Dornier Do K was the K1 which first flew on 7 May 1929. The K1 was a conventionally-braced high-wing monoplane, powered by a single nose-mounted 510 hp (380 kW) licence-built Bristol Jupiter VI radial engine, and had a conventional landing gear with a tailskid. The square-section fuselage had an enclosed cockpit for two with a cabin behind for freight or eight passengers. Test flights showed that performance was poor and the aircraft was redesigned.

=== Do K2 ===
The Do K2 flew in December 1929 with similar wings and fuselage but had a changed landing gear and four 240 hp (179 kW) Gnome-Rhone Titan radial engines. The four engines were strut mounted on each side of the fuselage in tandem pairs, one in tractor configuration and the other as a pusher. Although the aircraft had an increase in available power, the performance was little improved on the K1.

=== Do K3 ===
The K3 was a complete rethink of the design. The braced wing was replaced with a cantilever wing of larger span. The fuselage was changed to oval and stretched for two extra passengers and the tailskid was replaced with a tailwheel and the main units were enclosed in fairings. The four engines were in the same tandem arrangement as the K2, but located lower on the fuselage and changed to 305 hp (227 kW) Walter Castor radial engines. The performance was greatly improved but still provoked little interest and no others were built.

== Specifications (Do K3) ==
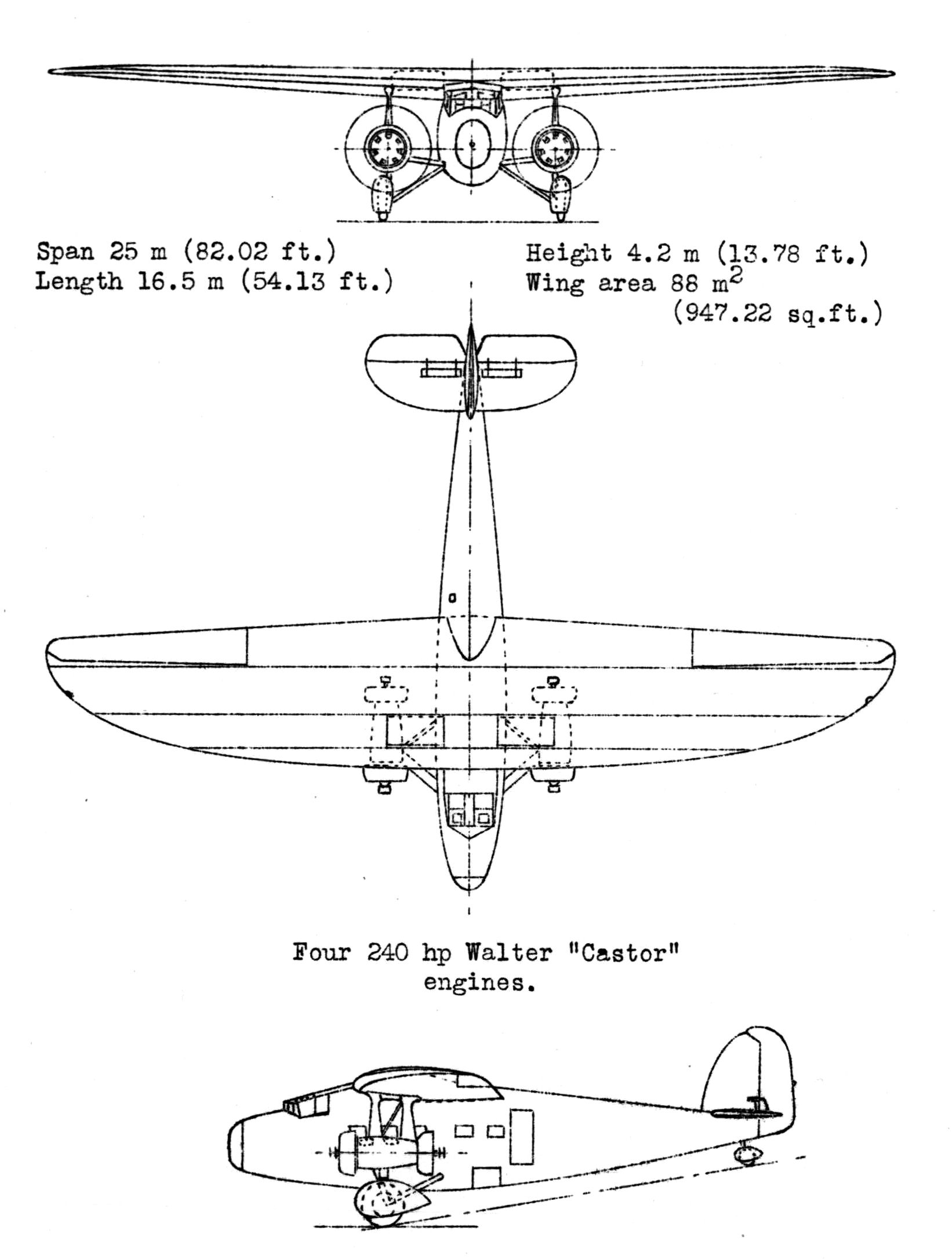
Dornier Do K3 3-view drawing from NACA aircraft Circular No.155

Data from The Illustrated Encyclopedia of Aircraft

General characteristics

- Crew: two
- Capacity: ten
- Length: 16.65 m (54 ft 7.5 in)
- Wingspan: 25 m (82 ft 0.25 in)
- Height: 4.55 m (14 ft 11.25 in)
- Wing area: 89 m^{2} (958.02 sq ft)
- Empty weight: 4,265 kg (9,403 lb)
- Gross weight: 6,200 kg (13,669 lb)
- Powerplant: 4 × Walter Castor radial piston engine , 227 kW (305 hp) each

Performance

- Maximum speed: 230 km/h (143 mph, 124 kn)
- Range: 800 km (497 mi, 432 nmi)
- Service ceiling: 6,000 m (19,685 ft)
