= Dornier Do 20 =

Flying boat design

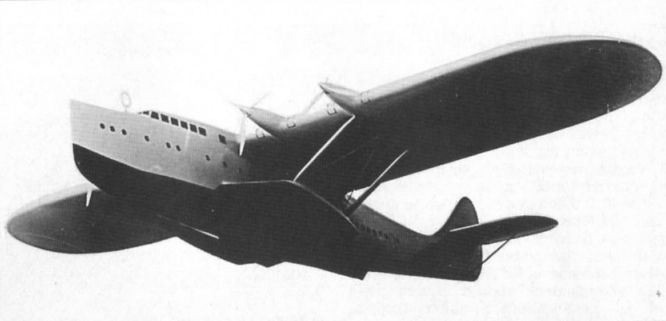
Model of the Dornier Do 20 (1936)

The Dornier Do 20 was a proposed commercial flying boat designed in the mid-1930s. It was envisaged as an improved and enlarged version of the Dornier Do X Flugschiff (flying ship) that first flew in 1929. The Do X was not entirely successful, being under-powered despite using six pairs of engines mounted above the wing, and only three were built. Dornier proposed to overcome the shortcomings of the Do X by replacing the pylon-mounted engines with four pairs of diesel engines each of about 1,000 horse power, each pair fitted into a nacelle fared into the leading edge of the wing and driving one of the aircraft's four propellers.

A model of the aircraft was exhibited at the 1936 International Aviation Exhibition in Stockholm (ILIS) and details were published in the 1937 edition of Jane's All the World's Aircraft. No orders were received and no Do 20 aircraft were ever built.
