= Dornier Libelle =

Libelle
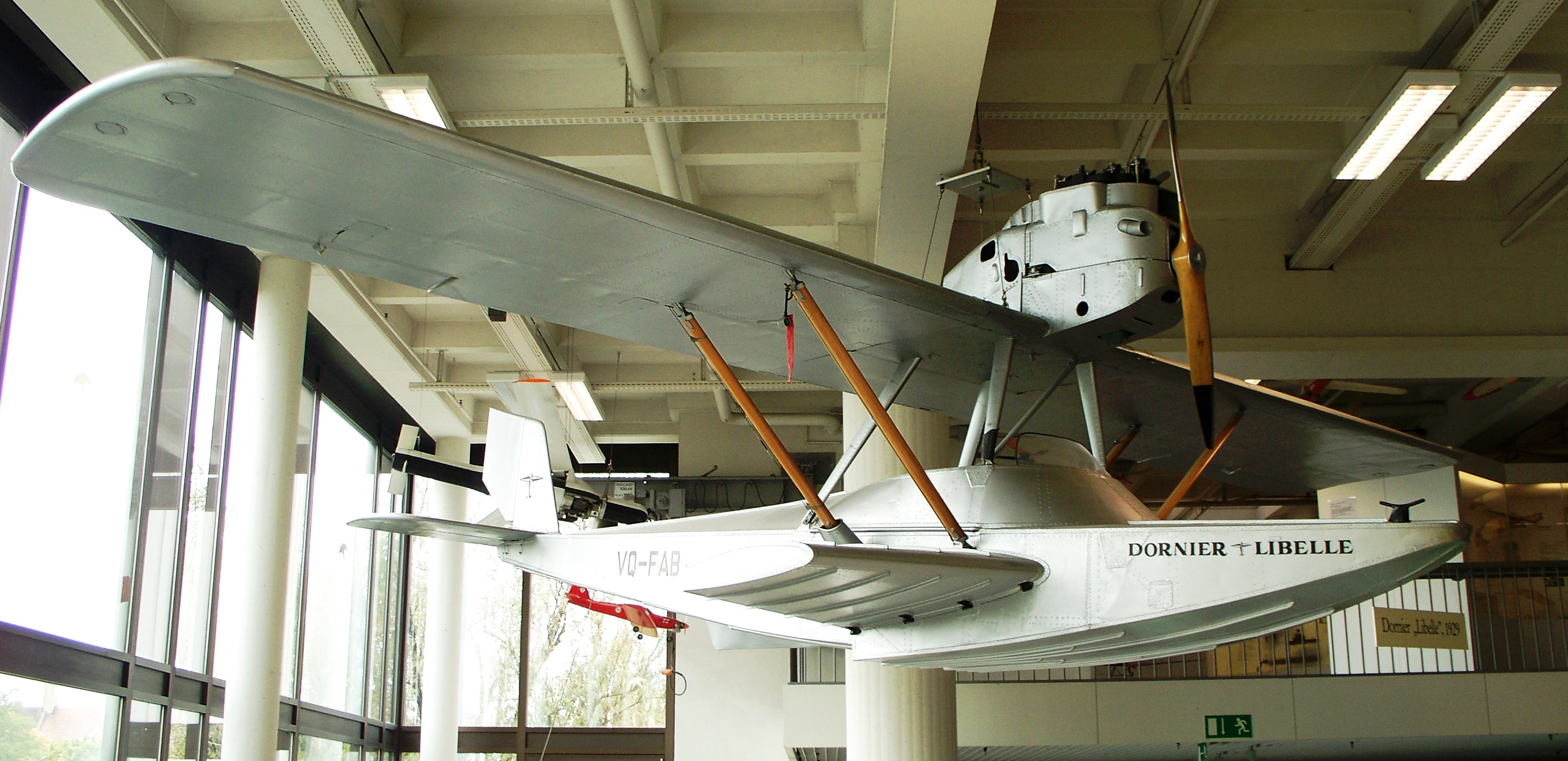
- The Dornier Libelle II in the Deutsches Museum München

General information
- Type: Flying boat
- Manufacturer: Dornier
- Designer: Claude Dornier
- Number built: 2x Do A + 5x Libelle I + 3x Libelle II

History
- First flight: 16 August 1921

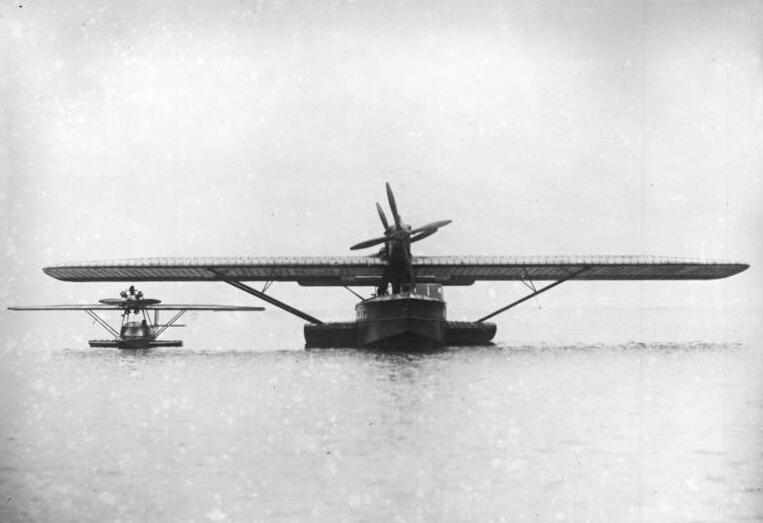
Dornier Libelle in 1928

The Dornier Libelle (en:"Dragonfly I"), also designated Do A, was a German open-cockpit, all-metal, parasol wing, monoplane flying boat aircraft, with partly fabric-covered wings. There was three versions of the seaplane version; the prototype, first version, and improved version (the Libelle 2). A landplane version, built without sponsons and fitted with a fixed tailwheel undercarriage was produced as the Dornier Spatz.

== Variants ==
Do A
Two prototypes of the Libelle
Libelle I
The standard production model, five built, fitted with Siemens-Halske Sh 4 engines and two built with 59.7 kW (80 hp) Siemens-Halske Sh 5 engines.
Libelle II
The improved Libelle II was powered by Siemens-Halske Sh 5 or 75 kW (101 hp) Siemens-Halske Sh 11 engines. Other engines fitted to Libelle II aircraft include the Bristol Lucifer and the ADC Cirrus. Three built.

== Accidents ==
A Dornier Libelle crashed into the sea off Milford beach in Auckland, New Zealand on 12 December 1929, killing both crewmen.

== Survivor ==
A Libelle II VQ-FAB, manufacturers number 117 built in 1925, which operated in Fiji, is displayed in the Deutsches Museum in the centre of Munich.

== Specifications (Libelle I) ==
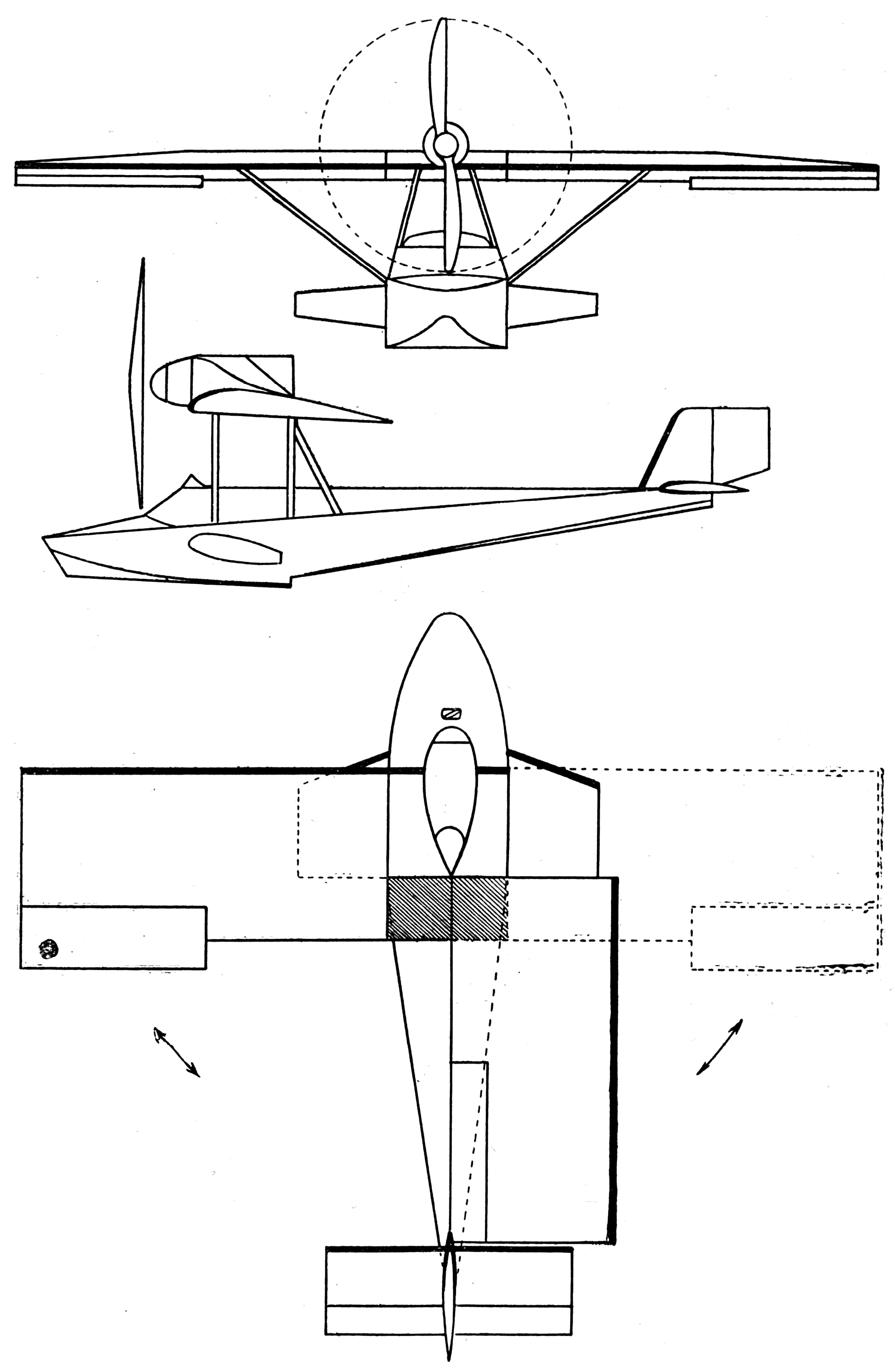
Dornier Libelle 3-view drawing from Les Ailes March 9,1922

Data from

General characteristics

- Crew: one
- Capacity: two passengers
- Length: 7.18 m (23 ft 7 in)
- Wingspan: 8.5 m (27 ft 11 in)
- Height: 2.27 m (7 ft 5 in)
- Wing area: 14 m^{2} (150 sq ft)
- Empty weight: 420 kg (926 lb)
- Gross weight: 640 kg (1,411 lb)
- Fuel capacity: fuel 42 kg (93 lb)fuel + oil 10 kg (22 lb)
- Powerplant: 1 × Siemens-Halske Sh 4 5-cyl. air-cooled radial piston engine, 45 kW (60 hp)

Performance

- Maximum speed: 120 km/h (75 mph, 65 kn)
- Cruise speed: 100 km/h (62 mph, 54 kn)
- Range: 300 km (190 mi, 160 nmi)
- Service ceiling: 1,600 m (5,200 ft)
