= Claude Dornier =

German aircraft designer

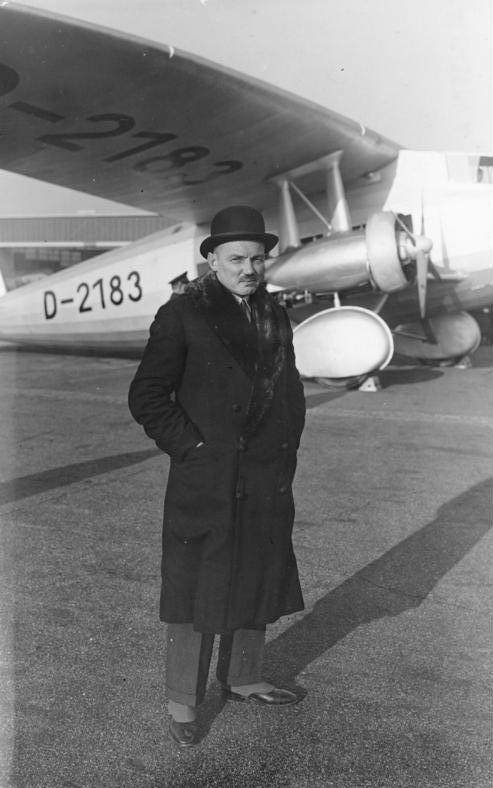
Claude Dornier 1931 in front of a Dornier Do K-3

Claude (Claudius) Honoré Désiré Dornier (14 May 1884 – 5 December 1969) was a Franco-German airplane designer and founder of Dornier GmbH. His notable designs include the 12-engine Dornier Do X flying boat, for decades the world's largest and most powerful airplane. He also made several other successful aircraft.

== Biography ==
The son of a French wine importer and his German wife, Claude Dornier was born in Kempten im Allgäu in Bavaria where he grew up and attended school, with science being his chief interest. Dornier then moved to Munich, where he graduated in 1907 from the Technical University.

As a young engineer, Dornier first worked on strength calculations at the Nagel Engineering Works in Karlsruhe. In 1910 he joined Luftschiffbau Zeppelin in Friedrichshafen on the Bodensee, where his abilities quickly attracted Count Ferdinand von Zeppelin's attention. Soon appointed as the Count's personal scientific advisor, Dornier began working on improving the strength of light metal sections, and later on aircraft engineering and giant metal flying boats and was responsible for the development of the first stressed skin all-metal monocoque aircraft designs, including the Zeppelin-Lindau D.I, which was the first such aircraft to enter production.

After political pressure he joined the Nazi Party in 1940 and during the Second World War his company created many aircraft for the German armed forces. After the war during the denazification of Germany, Claude Dornier was classified as a "Follower" (Group IV).

Dornier received the Ludwig-Prandtl-Ring from the Deutsche Gesellschaft für Luft- und Raumfahrt (German Society for Aeronautics and Astronautics) for "outstanding contribution in the field of aerospace engineering" in 1959.

His son, Claudius Dornier Jr., was also an aircraft designer.

In 1987 Dornier was inducted into the International Air & Space Hall of Fame at the San Diego Air & Space Museum.
