= Kreider-Reisner XC-31 =

Transport aircraft, U.S. Army Air Corps, 1934

XC-31
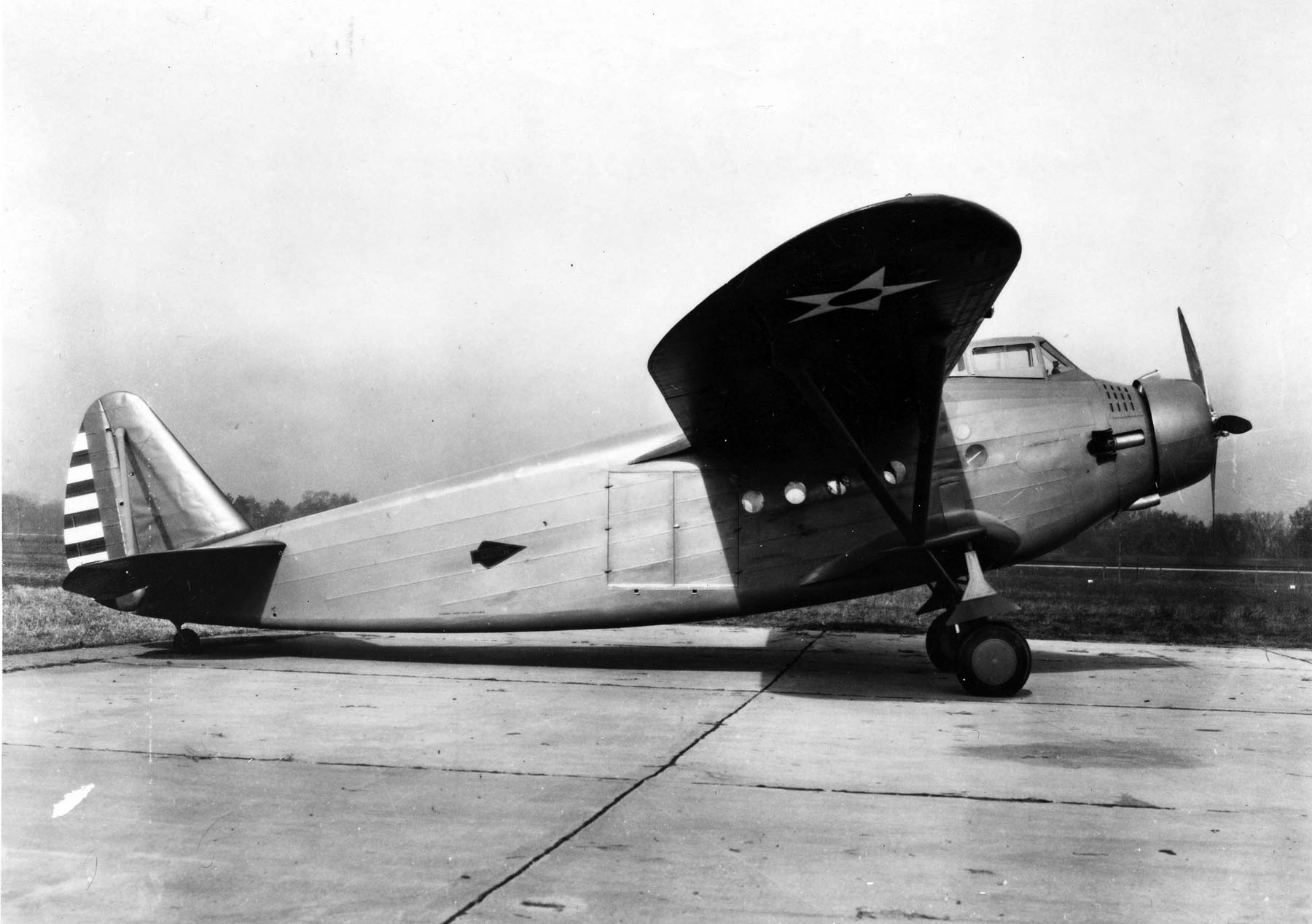

General information
- Type: Single-engine transport
- National origin: United States
- Manufacturer: Kreider-Reisner; Fairchild Aircraft
- Primary user: United States Army Air Corps
- Number built: 1

History
- First flight: September 22, 1934

The Kreider-Reisner XC-31 or Fairchild XC-31 was an American single-engined monoplane transport aircraft of the 1930s designed and built by Kreider-Reisner. It was one of the last fabric-covered aircraft tested by the U.S. Army Air Corps. Designed as an alternative to the emerging twin-engined transports of the time such as the Douglas DC-2, it was evaluated by the Air Corps at Wright Field, Ohio, under the test designation XC-941, but rejected in favor of all-metal twin-engined designs.

The XC-31 was built with an aluminum alloy framework covered by fabric, and featured strut-braced wing and fully retractable landing gear, with the main gear units mounted on small wing-like stubs and retracting inwards. An additional novel feature was the provision of main cargo doors that were parallel with the ground to facilitate loading.

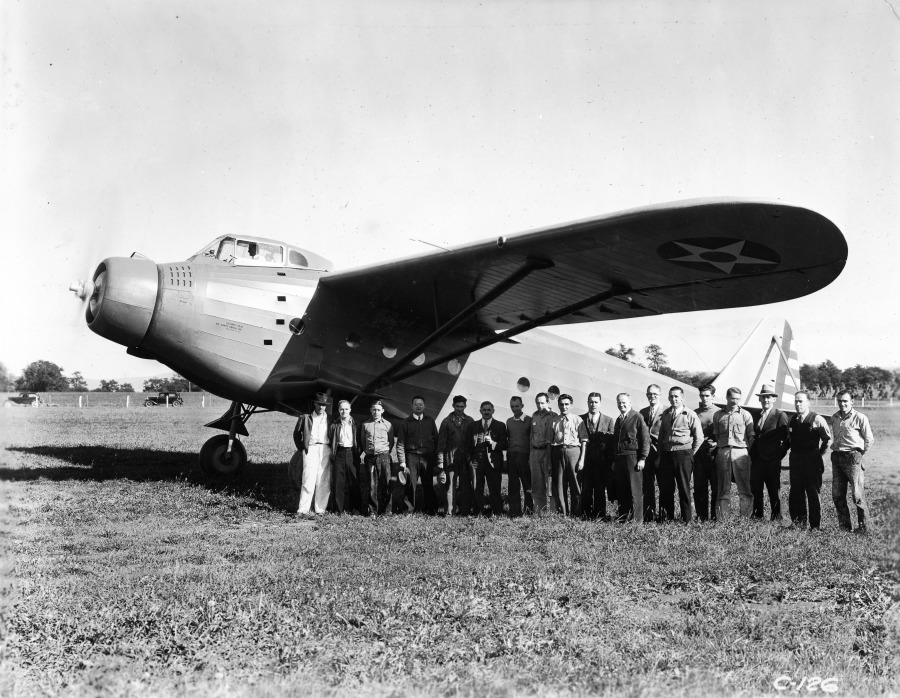
Kreider-Reisner XC-31 - 34-026

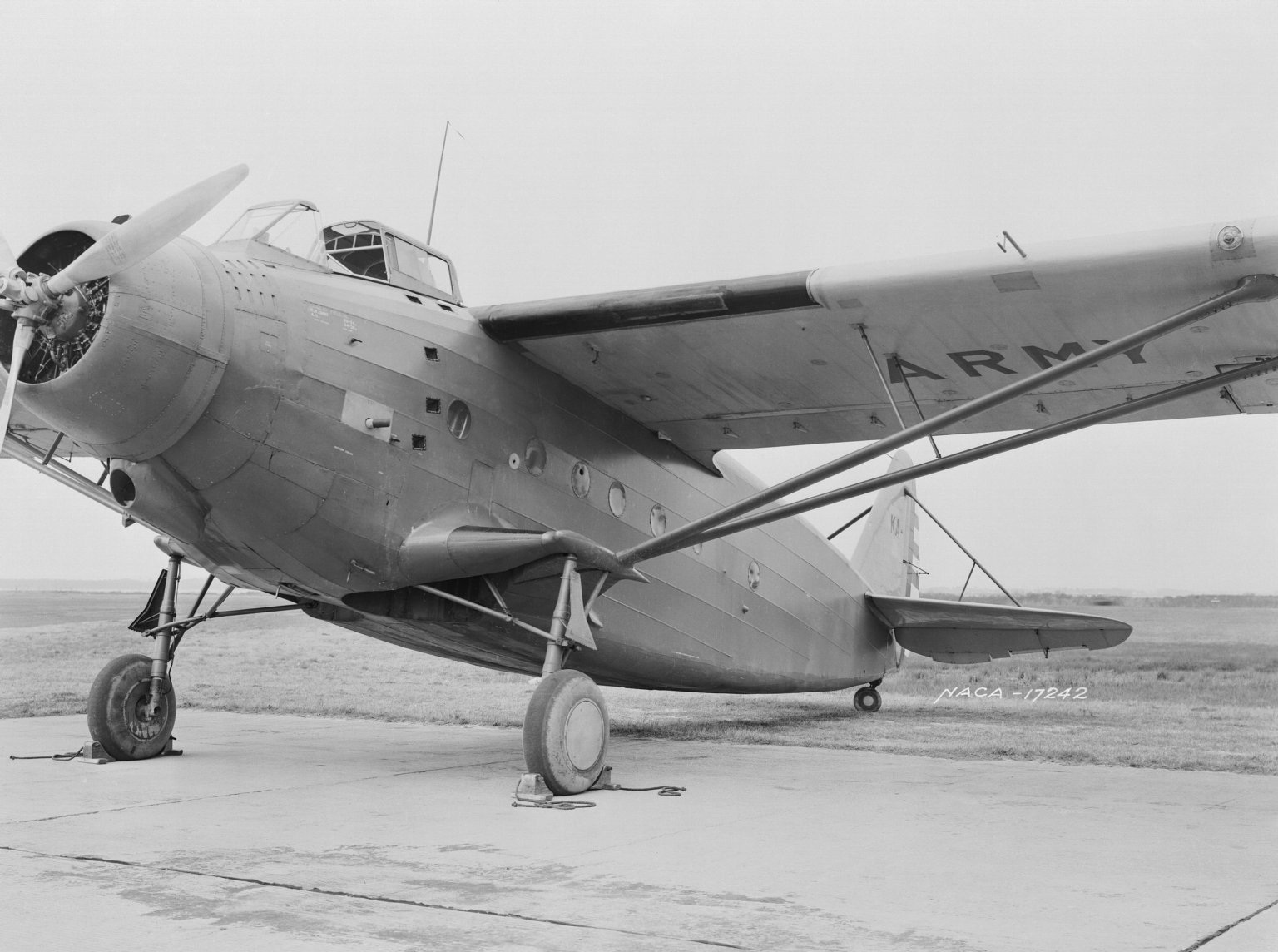
XC-31 at Langley

Following evaluation by the USAAC, the XC-31 was transferred to NACA, which used it for icing studies at its Langley Research Center.

== Specifications ==
Data from ,

General characteristics

- Crew: 1 (Pilot)
- Capacity: 15 passengers or 3,500 pounds (1,600 kg) of cargo
- Length: 55 ft 5 in (16.89 m)
- Wingspan: 75 ft 0 in (22.86 m)
- Height: 15 ft 10 in (4.83 m)
- Wing area: 802 sq ft (74.5 m^{2})
- Empty weight: 7,322 lb (3,321 kg)
- Gross weight: 12,750 lb (5,783 kg)
- Powerplant: 1 × Wright R-1820-25 radial , 750 hp (559 kW)

Performance

- Maximum speed: 154 mph (248 km/h, 134 kn)
- Cruise speed: 143 mph (230 km/h, 124 kn)
- Range: 775 mi (1,247 km, 673 nmi)
- Service ceiling: 15,000 ft (4,570 m)

== See also ==
Related development

- Fairchild 100

Aircraft of comparable role, configuration, and era

- Douglas DC-2
- Ford Trimotor
- Junkers Ju 52

Related lists

- List of military aircraft of the United States
