= Meyers Midget =

Midget
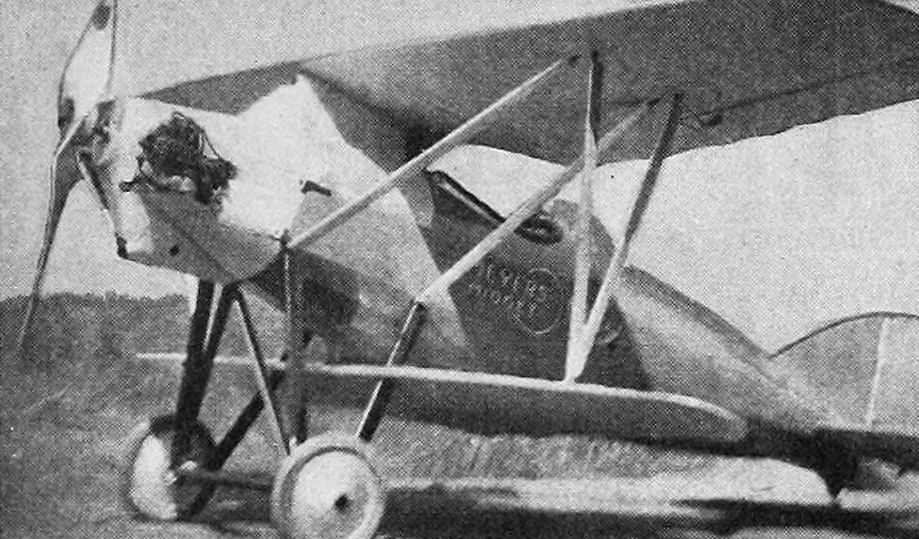

General information
- Type: Single-seat sports biplane
- National origin: United States of America
- Manufacturer: Kreider-Reisner Aircraft Co.
- Designer: Charles W. Meyers
- Number built: 1

History
- First flight: 6 September 1926

The Meyers Midget was a one-off small, low-powered, sporting single-seat sesquiplane, designed and built in the United States in 1926, incorporating several innovative structural features.

== Design and development ==
The Midget was a small, low-powered single-seat sesquiplane with some unusual features. Its lower wing had 75% of the span of the upper one and close to 75% of its chord. The upper wing was raised above the fuselage, as with most biplanes, but on a slim, faired pylon rather than by the usual cabane struts. The lower wing was similarly mounted clear of the fuselage underside. The Midget was a single bay biplane with vertical V-form interplane struts; unusually, it also had pairs of parallel lift struts from the lower fuselage longerons to the upper wings at the same points as the interplane struts, instead of interplane wires. The wing struts were of steel, faired in balsa wood. An advantage gained by mounting the wings clear of the fuselage was that the two channel spruce spars of both could run from tip to tip without interruption. In plan, both wings were straight tapered; only the upper planes carried ailerons. The wings were fabric covered.

The fuselage construction was also unusual. Birch veneer strips about one third of the depth of the fuselage ran lengthwise, joining birch bulkheads into a girder which was then strengthened with four L-shaped spruce longerons. Stressed longitudinal spruce strips formed rounded upper and lower fuselage surfaces, so that the overall cross-section was roughly oval. A plywood double girder ran centrally along the bottom of the mid-fuselage to the engine bulkhead, forming a mounting for the lower wing pylon, the cockpit and controls and parts of the engine mounting and undercarriage. The fuselage and tail surfaces were fabric covered except for a veneered region around the open cockpit, set under the wing trailing edge. The wide chord fin had a curved leading edge; the two-piece tailplane was fixed to the upper longerons. The control surfaces were unbalanced and had non-rigid trailing edges, the fabric taking up a scalloped shape.

The Midget was powered by an air-cooled 32 hp (24 kW) Bristol Cherub on a steel tube mounting and cowled with its cylinders protruding. Each mainwheel of the conventional undercarriage was located on a V-form pair of struts joined to the lower longeron at the base of the lift struts, the rear member passing through the lower wing. The two wheels and bungee shock absorbers were mounted on a single axle with an inverted V-strut from its ends to the fuselage central girder. All the undercarriage struts, like the wing struts, were of steel with balsa fairings. There was a small tailskid.

The aircraft was constructed by the Kreider-Reisner Aircraft Company. Not to be confused with the Kreider-Reisner A Midget, which was a low-wing monoplane racer.

== Operational history ==
The Midget made its first public appearance and its first flight at the National Air Races held in Philadelphia in September 1926. Despite the lack of preparation it did compete but retired with carburettor problems after seven laps. Speed, climb rate and control response were reportedly good. It was later destroyed in a crash after suffering an engine failure.

== Specifications ==
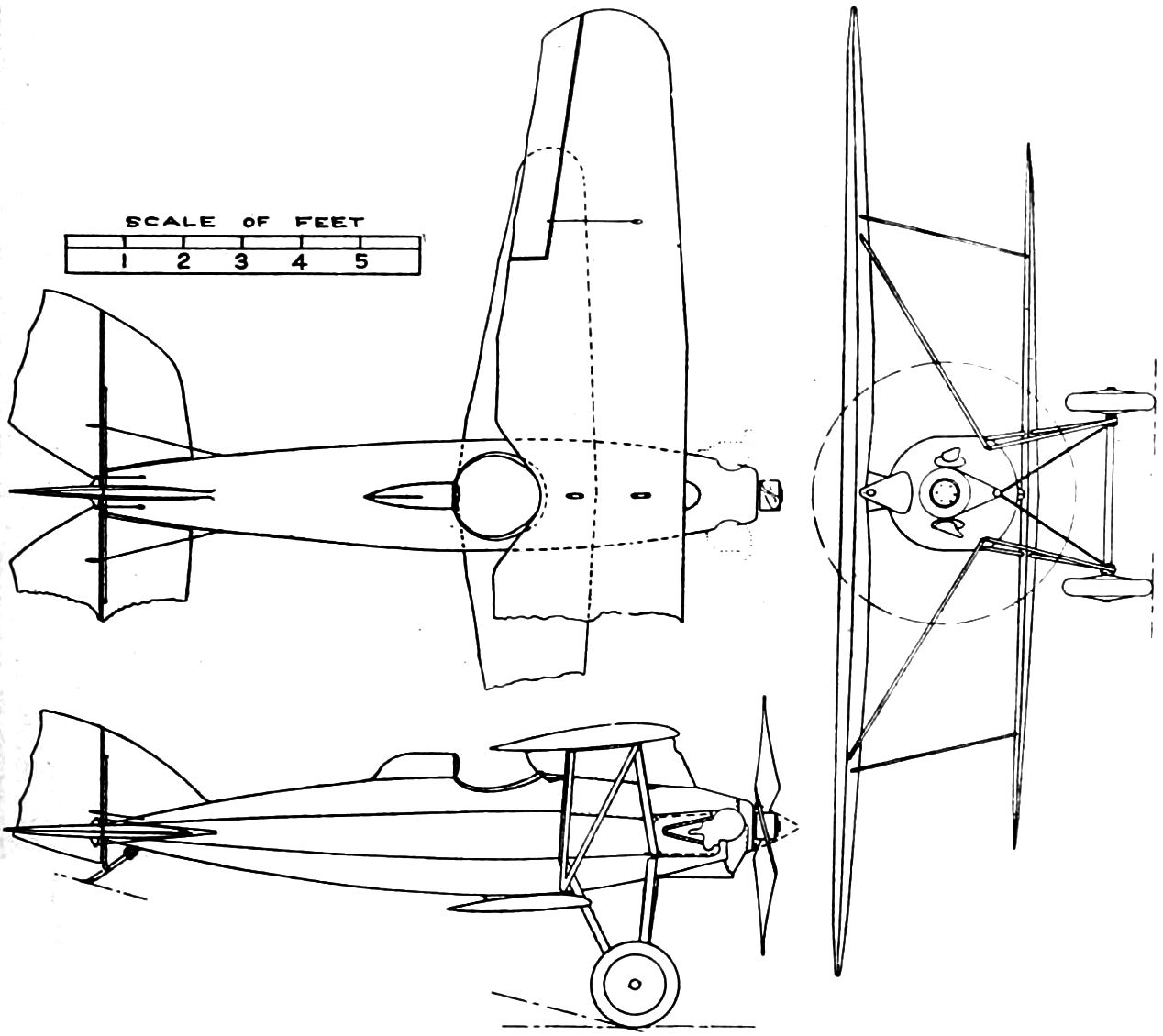
Meyers Midget 3-view drawing from Aero Digest April 1927

Data from Flight 1927

General characteristics

- Crew: one
- Length: 13 ft 2 in (4.01 m)
- Upper wingspan: 16 ft 0 in (4.88 m)
- Lower wingspan: 12 ft 0 in (3.66 m)
- Wing area: 70 sq ft (6.5 m^{2}) total; 65% from upper wing
- Airfoil: Meyers M.6
- Empty weight: 304 lb (138 kg)
- Gross weight: 480 lb (218 kg)
- Fuel capacity: 2.5 U.S. gal (2.1 Imp gal, 9.5 L)
- Powerplant: 1 × Bristol Cherub 2-cylinder horizontally opposed air cooled piston engine, 32 hp (24 kW)
- Propellers: 2-bladed Curtis-Reed all metal, 3 ft 1 in (940 mm) pitch, 4 ft 6 in (1.37 m) diameter

Performance

- Maximum speed: 100 mph (160 km/h, 87 kn) approximately
