= Kreider-Reisner =

Defunct American flying service and aircraft manufacturer

Kreider-Reisner Aircraft Company
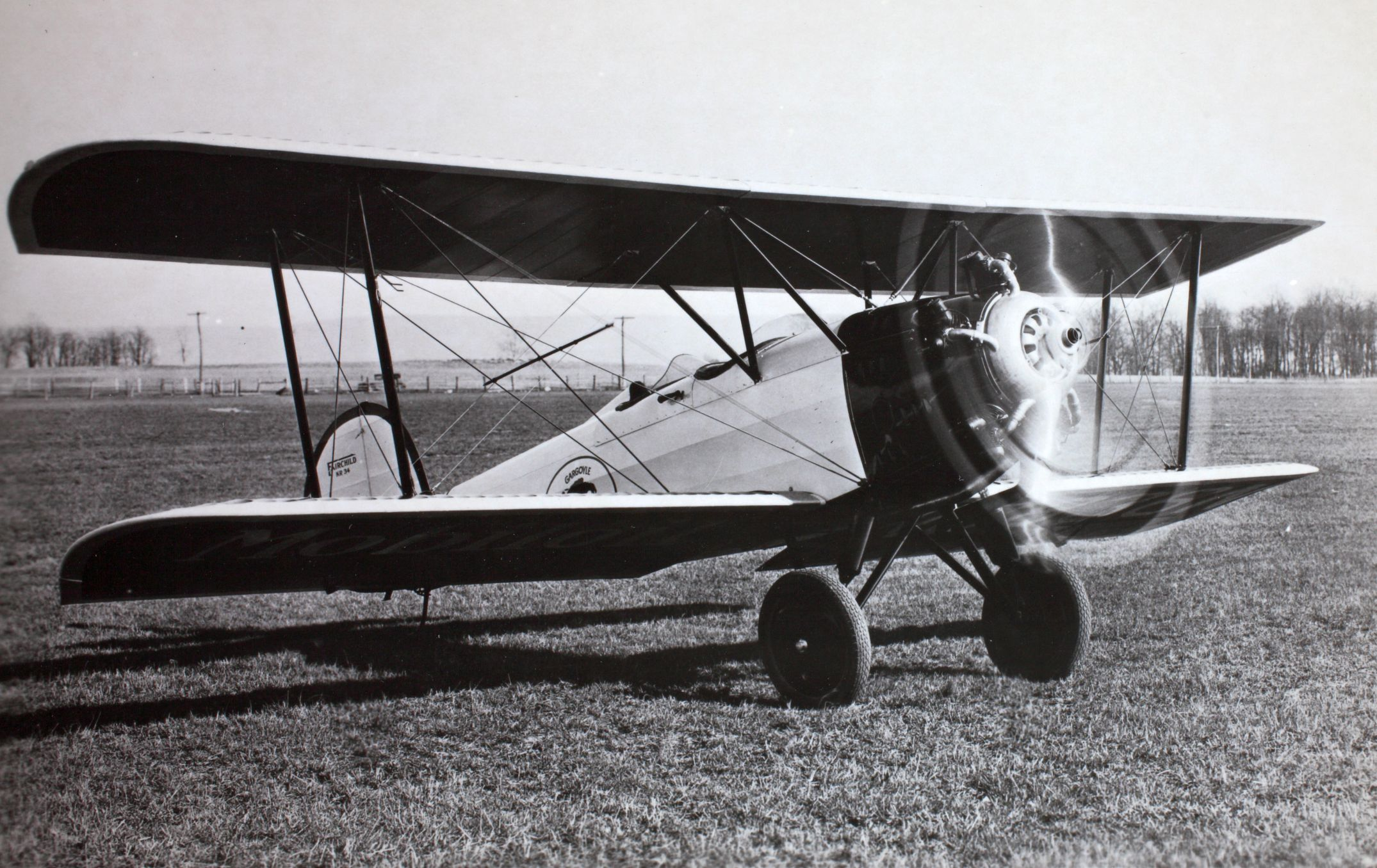
- Fairchild KR-34
- Industry: Aerospace
- Founded: 1923; 103 years ago
- Founders: Ammon H. Kreider; Lewis Reisner
- Defunct: 1929
- Successor: Fairchild Aircraft
- Headquarters: Hagerstown, Maryland, United States

The Kreider-Reisner Aircraft Company was an American flying service and aircraft manufacturer from 1923 to 1929.

== History ==
The Kreider-Reisner Aircraft Company was formed at Hagerstown, Maryland, in 1923 as a sub-contractor. By September 1925 the company was operating a general flying service and incorporated. In 1926 it designed and built the first aircraft the Midget lightplane. The aircraft performed well in aviation competitions so the company then designed a two-seat utility biplane. It had decided it was cheaper to design and build an aircraft for use in its own flying services and the resulting aircraft was the C-2 Challenger. A smaller version was designed and built in 1928 as the C-6 Challenger. On 1 April 1929 the company was bought by the Fairchild Aircraft Company who continued production at Hagerstown and redesignated the aircraft in a Fairchild KR series. Kreider remained president, but died on 13 April 1929 in a mid-air collision. Reisner left the company shortly afterward. By 1931, Fairchild had relocated its headquarters to the Hagerstown site. In 1935, the name of the company was changed to Fairchild Aircraft Corporation.

== Aircraft ==
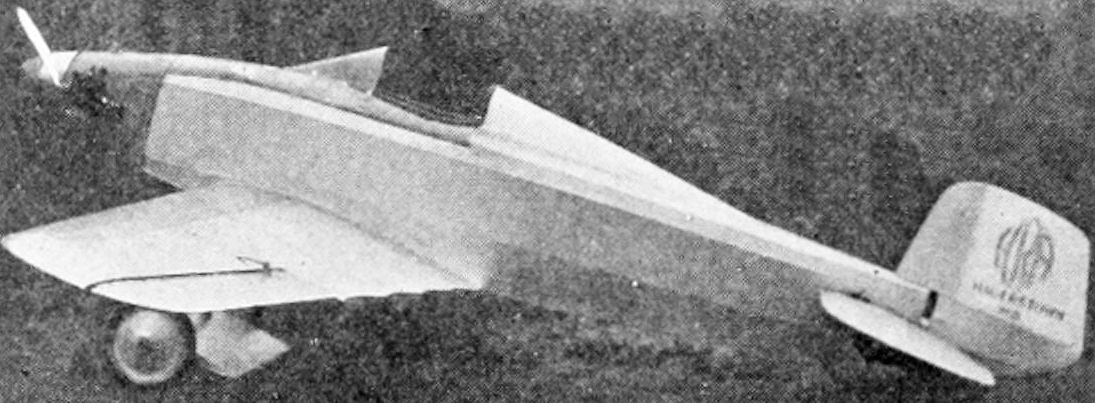
A Midget in the November 1926 issue of Aero Digest

Model name	First flight	Number built	Type
Kreider-Reisner C-2C Challenger		~167	Single engine utility biplane
Kreider-Reisner C-3C Challenger		4	Single engine utility biplane
Kreider-Reisner C-4C Challenger		~69	Single engine utility biplane
Kreider-Reisner C-5C Challenger		3	Single engine utility biplane
Kreider-Reisner C-6C Challenger		7	Single engine utility biplane
Kreider-Reisner XC-31	1934	1	Prototype single engine monoplane transport
Kreider-Reisner Midget	1926	1	Single engine racing monoplane
Meyers Midget	1926	1	Single engine racing sesquiplane

See also Fairchild 22 (Fairchild 22 Model C7)
