= Fairchild Dornier 328JET =

Regional airliner

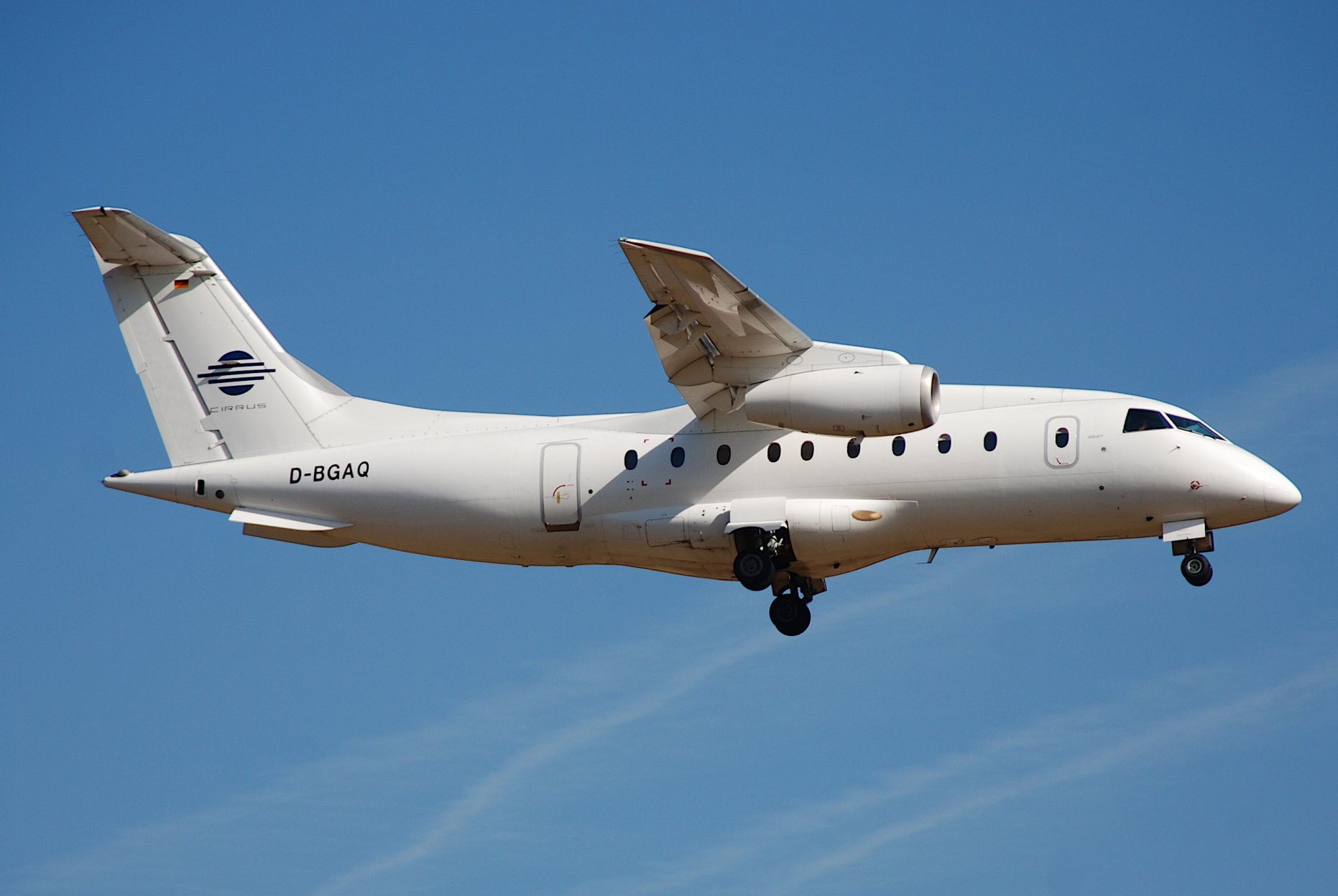
- A former Cirrus Airlines 328JET in 2008

General information
- Type: Airliner
- National origin: Germany
- Manufacturer: Fairchild Dornier
- Status: Active
- Primary users: Sun-Air of Scandinavia Ultimate Air Shuttle; Key Lime Air
- Number built: 110

History
- Manufactured: 1996–2002
- First flight: 20 January 1998
- Developed from: Dornier 328
- Variant: Fairchild Dornier 428JET
- Developed into: Lockheed Martin X-55

The Fairchild-Dornier 328JET is a commuter airliner, based upon the turboprop-powered Dornier 328, developed by the German aircraft manufacturer Dornier Luftfahrt GmbH. It would be the last Dornier-designed aircraft to reach production before the company's collapse during the early 2000s.

The 328JET was designed by Dornier in response to negative feedback from some customers on the marketability of turboprops against the more appealing turbofan engine. It was a relatively straightforward re-engining of the existing 328, being originally designated as the 328-300 prior to being rebranded as the 328JET. During 1996, early on in the programme, the financially distressed Dornier company was acquired by the American aerospace firm Fairchild Aircraft; the resulting corporation, named Fairchild Dornier, continued development of the 328JET. On 20 January 1998, the first 328JET prototype conducted its maiden flight.

While production of the 328 family was performed in Oberpfaffenhofen, Germany, sales activity was centred in San Antonio, Texas, and support for Dornier's products was provided from both locations. At one stage, a stretched variant commonly referred to as the 428JET was under active development. However, amid intense competition in the international market for regional jets, Fairchild Dornier were unable to attain enough sales of the type to maintain production after 2002. Support for existing aircraft continues, and a prospective revival of the programme has been mooted on multiple occasions, but no solid production-related activity has ensued. Sierra Nevada Corporation currently provides parts and maintenance support.

== Design and development ==
=== Background ===
During the early 1990s, German manufacturer Dornier had launched their turboprop-powered Dornier 328 onto the market. However, some prospective customers reported a negative perception of noise and reliability issues with turboprop engines, which motivated the company to study the manufacture of a turbofan-based variant, initially referred to as the 328-300. Market research had indicated that, provided that both the economics and performance of such an aircraft were competitive, this would have greater desirability amongst the market. According to Fairchild Dornier president Jim Robinson, such an arrangement had been examined early on in the 328's development process but had been rejected by then-parent company Daimler-Benz Aerospace AG (DASA). Reportedly, producing a jet-powered version of the airliner had been greatly aided by the relatively conservative structural design of the 328. Relatively few design modifications between the two airliners were necessary.

By November 1996, according to Dornier vice-president for sales Andrew Jampoler, a feasibility study for the programme had been completed and the company was close to selecting an engine; options considered included the General Electric CFE738, Pratt & Whitney Canada PW306, and the LF507-1F, as well as a de-rated LF507-2 powerplant. By adopting one of these engines, a cruise speed of between 375 and 390 kn (694 and 722 km/h) at 22,000 ft (6,700 m) could be achieved, noticeably higher than the original 328's current maximum speed of 335kn at the same altitude. Conservative projections anticipated the jet-powered airliner to consume roughly 30% more fuel than its turboprop-powered predecessor, although it was believed that this difference would be decreased by further refinements. Jampoler also stated that Dornier had forecast an in-service date of late 1998. Dornier ultimately opted for the Pratt & Whitney Canada PW306/9 engine. During early February 1997, Dornier formally launched the 328JET programme.

=== Original programme ===
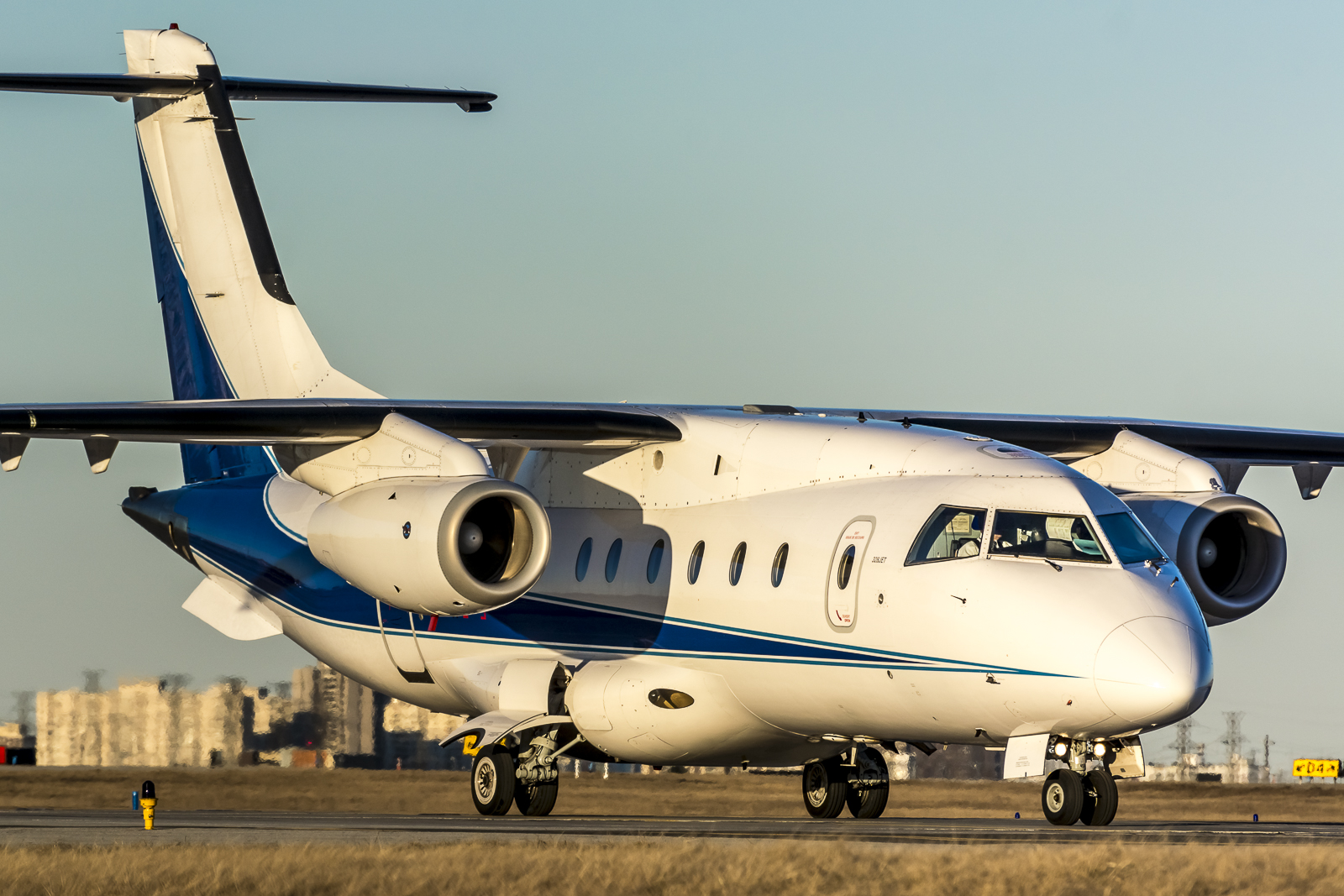
Pratt & Whitney Canada owned 328JET at Pearson International Airport

During the mid-1990s, Dornier experienced considerable financial difficulties; these heavily contributed to the company's acquisition by the American aerospace firm Fairchild Aircraft, after which the organisation became Fairchild Dornier. The new entity chose to continue with the programme, albeit rebranding the type as the 328JET. Even following the acquisition, considerable pressure remained on the programme's finances, extending through to its suppliers, leading to reorganisations and premature withdrawals from involvement. By the end of 1997, Dornier-Fairchild had cut its annual costs by $58 million, and anticipated exceeding its $115 million cost-cutting target within two years. Management shake-ups and other measures continued to be performed as part of efforts to reform the business.

In spite of internal pressures, senior figures remained upbeat about the prospects for the 328JET and the regional jet market. During June 1997, the first sales of the type were announced, French regional operator Proteus Airlines emerged as the launch customer as a result of a $70 million order for six aircraft, alongside orders from other customers. It was hoped that the 328JET would have market appeal with those who found the 328 to not meet their preferences, in particular those customers based in the Middle East. By the end of the year, Dornier had reportedly secured 17 firm orders and 15 options, while the company claimed it was negotiating two major orders for up to 180 aircraft with the aim of closing over the following three months. Dornier representatives believed that there was a viable market for up to 600 328JETs. According to Andrew Doyle of the aerospace periodical Flight International, the reenginging programme was being well-received, referring to it as "a new lease of life".

By March 1997, reports emerged that Dornier was set to start converting the second 328 prototype into the first turbofan-powered 328JET prototype. During October 1997, as work was underway on building the first prototype, Dornier announced several improvements to the aircraft, including a higher cruise speed of 400kt that was achieved via a minor reduction of the trailing edge flaps. On 6 December 1997, the 328JET prototype rolled out at Dornier's facility outside Oberpfaffenhofen, Germany, after which ground-based testing commenced immediately. On 20 January 1998, the prototype conducted its maiden flight; it was piloted by Meinhardt Feuersenger, hitherto chief test pilot of the turboprop 328, and Peter Weger. This initial flight over the Bavarian Alps attained a peak altitude of 25,000 ft (7,600 m) and lasted for almost 2 hours. The flight test programme would involve a total of four prototypes. According to Dornier, performance figures gained from the flight testing phase had either met or exceeded their established expectations. Certification was delayed by four months to address issues with the 328JET's undercarriage, specifically involving the brakes and shock absorbers. During July 1999, type certification was granted by the European Joint Aviation Authorities, corresponding approval from the Federal Aviation Administration (FAA) was received within the following weeks.

Early on the 328JET programme, Dornier were already considering options for a stretched version of the aircraft, originally referred to as the 328-700. During 1998, following the first flight of the type, Fairchild-Dornier opted to pursue development of the stretched 428JET, a 44-seat version of the 328JET. Work proceeded to the point several customers had signed letters of intent to purchase the upcoming aircraft. Furthermore, Dornier had planned to conduct a comprehensive upgrade of the existing model, involving an avionics overhaul and possible re-winging to use a new swept wing, around the early 2000s. By 1998, a dedicated corporate-orientated version, branded Envoy 3, was also being promoted. However, a consequence of intense competition within the regional airliner market was multiple manufacturers making losses and terminating their programmes; Fairchild-Dornier were no exception to the industry-wide pressure. The limited commercial performance of the 328JET had placed Fairchild-Dornier into a precarious financial position, the company ultimately being unable to continue the development of further models. As such, the 328JET became the last commercial aircraft to be produced by the former Dornier business prior to being rendered insolvent during 2002.

=== Post-Dornier developments ===
Following Dornier's insolvency, AvCraft Aviation of Virginia acquired the 328 program during March 2003. This acquisition included rights to the design itself, a total of 18 328JETs in various stages of assembly, and the development work on the 428JET. After the sale of these airplanes, AvCraft negotiated with its suppliers to resume production due to low profit expectations for its other projects. During 2004, the first of AvCraft's 328JET was delivered.

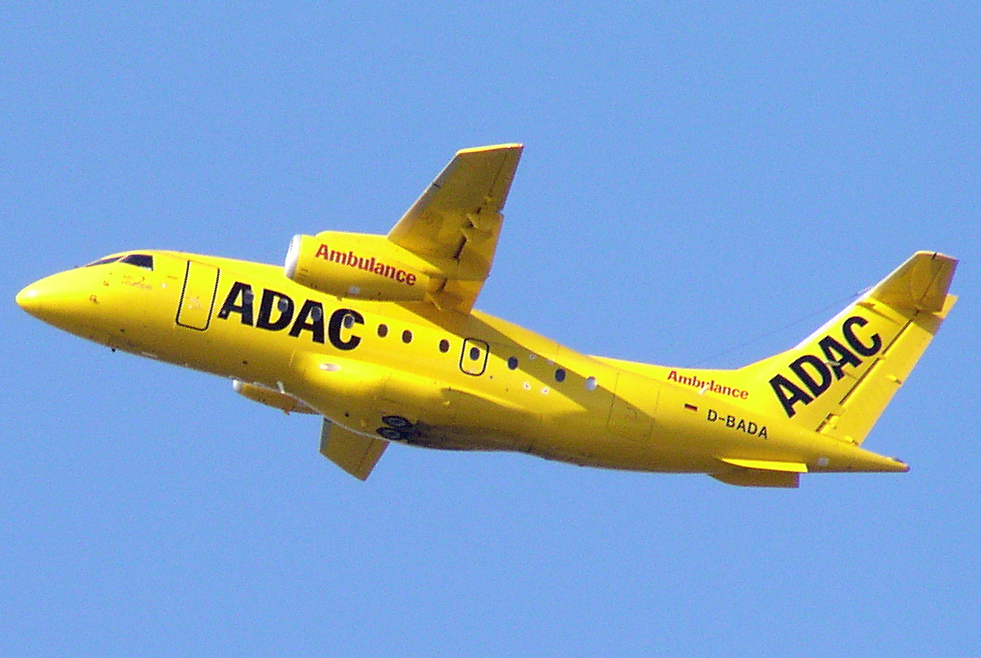
ADAC 328JET air ambulance

During 2005, AvCraft itself filed for bankruptcy. As a consequence, the firm was acquired by private equity investors and reformed as M7 Aerospace. During June 2006, 328 Support Services GmbH acquired the 328JET type certificate. However, this entity did not resume manufacturing of the type; instead, it opted to provide maintenance, repair and overhaul services to the 330 in-service fleet.

During February 2015, US engineering company Sierra Nevada Corporation acquired 328 Support Services GmbH. Shortly thereafter, Sierra Nevada's owner, Turkish-American engineer Fatih Ozmen, established a private corporation named Özjet Havacılık Teknolojileri A.Ş. at Technopark of Bilkent University, Ankara and signed a Memorandum of understanding with the Transportation Ministry of Turkey in order to manufacture the 328 at Ankara. In June 2015, the Turkish government launched the Turkish TR328 and TRJ328 regional aircraft project, a modernized 328/328JET, with either turboprops or jets. It could be followed by the larger TR628/TRJ-628.

At one point, the first flight of a Turkish-built aircraft was anticipated to occur during 2019. However, During October 2017, Turkey announced that it was abandoning the programme as a consequence of escalating costs. Stating that they believe demand in the sub 40-seat market is still present for the type, Sierra Nevada Corporation and 328 Support Services GmbH began to seek out for other opportunities in order to revive the aircraft, hoping to follow through by the end of 2017 or early 2018.

== Variants ==
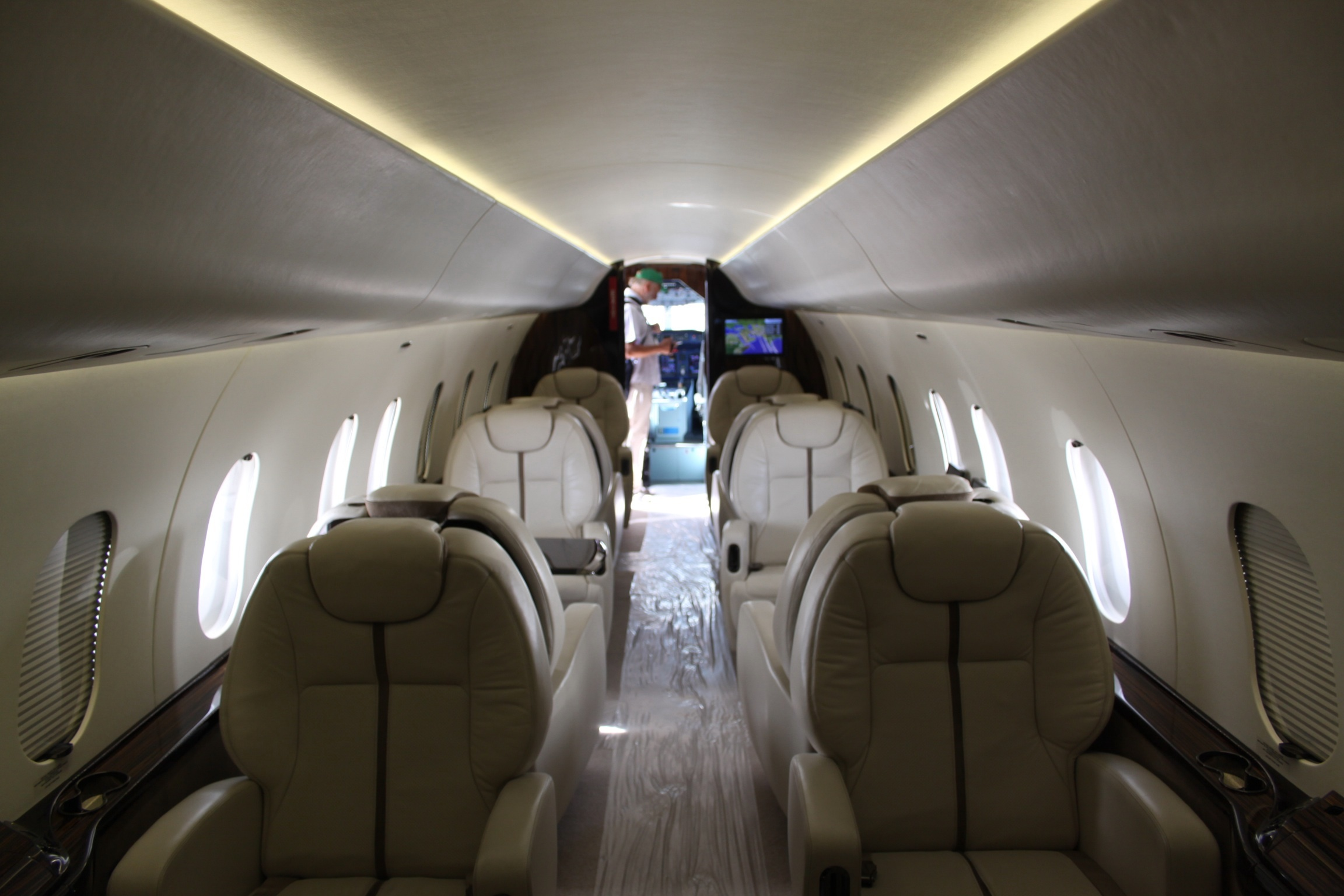
Interior of a 328JET. Note the business jet configuration

328JET
Turbofan-powered variant, formerly known as the 328-300.
428JET
A 44-seat derivative that was under development at the time of the collapse of Fairchild-Dornier.
Lockheed Martin X-55 Advanced Composite Cargo Aircraft (ACCA)
A Dornier 328J with its mid/aft fuselage and empennage replaced with advanced composite materials. The ACCA is a Lockheed Martin demonstrator to advance composite usage on next-generation tactical air mobility transports for the US Air Force Research Laboratory.

== Operators ==
In December 2019, a total of 33 Dornier 328JET aircraft remained in airline service. The only operators remaining were Sun Air of Scandinavia with 14 aircraft, Key Lime Air and Ultimate Jetcharters with 14 aircraft combined, Taos Air operated by Advanced Air with 2 aircraft, and Calm Air, Sepehran Airlines, and Air Peace with 1 aircraft each.

Past airline operators in the U.S. include Skyway Airlines, a feeder airline for Midwest Airlines, which flew twelve 328JET aircraft and Great Plains Airlines which operated four 328JET aircraft. Skyway, Midwest and Great Plains are no longer in existence. Atlantic Coast Airlines operated over 30 328JET aircraft as part of its Delta Connection service from 2000 until 2005 when Delta Air Lines and Atlantic Coast terminated their agreement with the arrival of Airbus A319s into the rebranded Independence Air fleet.

Pratt & Whitney Canada owns and operates one Dornier 328JET, registry number C-GCPW, between its Montreal and Toronto facilities as an employee shuttle. It primarily flies between Toronto Pearson International Airport (CYYZ) and Montreal Saint-Hubert Longueuil Airport (CYHU).

== Accidents and incidents ==
- On 3 June 2006, a PAC-Private Air Charters Fairchild Dornier 328JET overran runway 34R at Manassas Regional Airport and stopped on a road near the airport. None of the eight passengers and crew were injured in the incident but the damage to the aircraft was substantial.

== Specifications (Dornier 328-300JET) ==
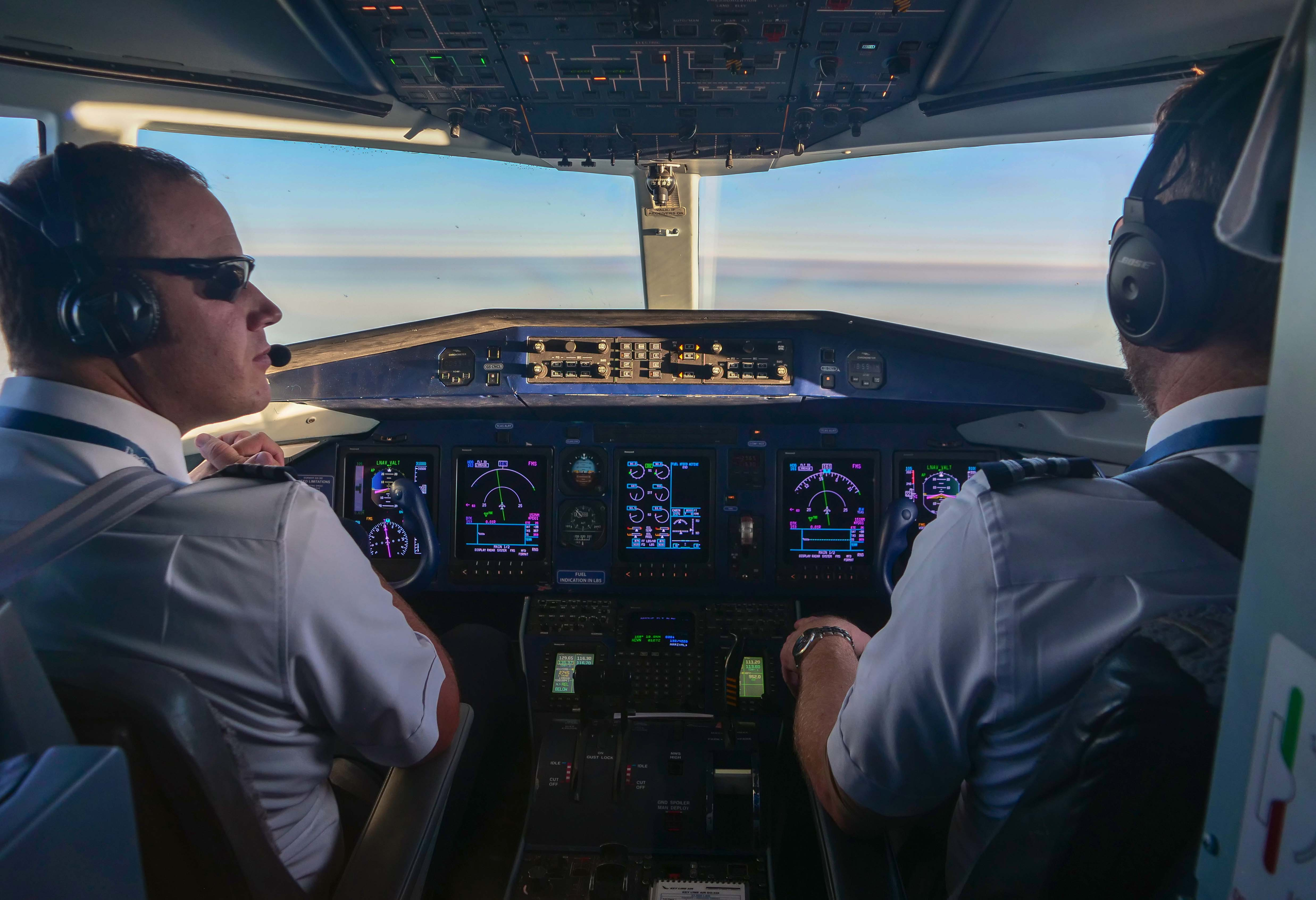
Cockpit view of a DAC Dornier 328JET inflight.

Data from Airliners.net

General characteristics

- Crew: Three (two pilots + flight attendant)
- Capacity: 30 to 33 passengers, Max payload 3,266 kg (7,200 lb)
- Length: 21.11 m (69 ft 3 in)
- Wingspan: 20.98 m (68 ft 10 in)
- Height: 7.24 m (23 ft 9 in)
- Wing area: 40.0 m^{2} (431 sq ft)
- Empty weight: 9,420 kg (20,768 lb)
- Max takeoff weight: 15,660 kg (34,524 lb)
- Powerplant: 2 × Pratt & Whitney Canada PW306B , 26.9 kN (6,000 lbf) thrust each

Performance

- Maximum speed: 750 km/h (470 mph, 400 kn)
- Range: 2,740 km (1,700 mi, 1,480 nmi) with optional long range fuel tank
- Service ceiling: 11,000 m (35,000 ft)

== See also ==
Related development

- Dornier 328
- Fairchild Dornier 428JET
- Lockheed Martin X-55
- Fairchild Dornier 728 family

Aircraft of comparable role, configuration, and era

- Antonov An-148
- Bombardier CRJ200
- British Aerospace 146
- Embraer ERJ 135

Related lists

- List of jet airliners
