= M7 Aerospace =

United States aerospace company

- Logo as of 2004
- Type: Subsidiary
- Industry: Aerospace and Defense
- Predecessor: Fairchild Dornier Aviation
- Founded: 2003
- Headquarters: San Antonio, Texas, United States
- Area served: Worldwide
- Number of employees: ~500
- Parent: Elbit Systems
- Website: elbitsystems.com

M7 Aerospace LP is an aerospace company with its headquarters on the property of San Antonio International Airport in Uptown San Antonio, Texas, United States.

M7 Aerospace was founded in 2003, when it purchased the assets of the bankrupt Fairchild Dornier Aviation, including a 426,000 sq ft (39,600 m^{2}) manufacturing and support facility in San Antonio. The assets did not include aircraft manufacturing, as the design of the final aircraft type produced by Fairchild Dornier, the financial failure 328Jet, had been sold by the bankruptcy trustee to AvCraft Technical Services.

M7 Aerospace has five distinct business units:

- Aircraft Parts and Product Support
- Government logistics support
- Aerostructures manufacturing
- Aircraft Maintenance, Repair and Overhaul (MRO)
- Aerial orthorectified imaging

On December 15, 2010, M7 was purchased by the United States subsidiary of the Israeli defense contractor Elbit Systems, for US$85 million (equivalent to $122 million in 2025) in cash.

In 2017, M7 received a $176 million contract from DynCorp to provide maintenance work related to the US Army's fleet of C-26s and C-35s. In 2019, M7 received a $22 million contract from Support Systems Associates, Inc. (SSAI) to provide avionics upgrades to the US Air National Guard's RC-26B aircraft, with SSAI having received a contract to upgrade the same systems for $31 million from the United States Department of Defense the previous year. M7 is the original equipment manufacturer for the RC-26Bs.
