= Fairchild KR-34 =

Type of aircraft

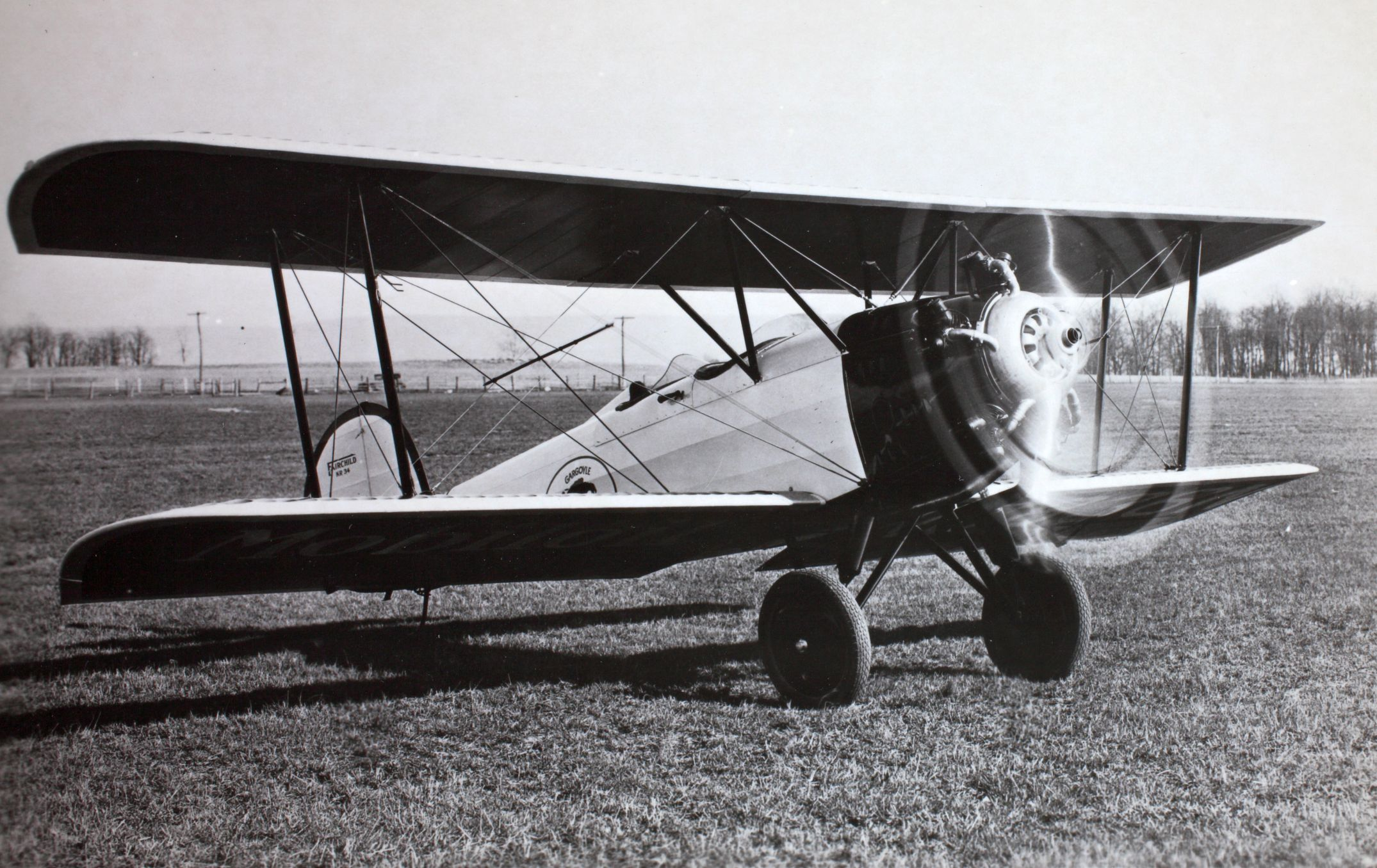
- KR-34

General information
- Type: Utility biplane
- Manufacturer: Kreider-Reisner Aircraft; Fairchild Aircraft

History
- First flight: 1928

The Kreider-Reisner Challenger (later the Fairchild KR series) is an American utility biplane aircraft designed and produced by the Kreider-Reisner Aircraft Company, which was later taken over by the Fairchild Aircraft Company.

== Development ==
The Challenger C-1 was possibly developed from the similar Waco 10. A poorly documented aircraft, the C-1 was progressively modified.

The Challenger was a conventional mixed-construction biplane with a fixed tailskid landing gear. It had two open tandem cockpits for a pilot (at the rear), and passenger (forward) and was powered initially by a 90 hp (67 kW) Curtiss OX-5 inline engine. A number of variants were built as the C-3 Challenger and C-4 Challenger which had detail differences and different engines fitted. Late in 1928 the company introduced a new and slightly smaller design as the C-6 Challenger.

In 1929 the company was absorbed by the Fairchild Aircraft Company who continued the production of the C-4 as the Fairchild KR-34 and the C-6 as the Fairchild KR-21. Although not built by Fairchild the C-2 was redesignated the Fairchild KR-31.

To act as an engine testbed one KR-21 was modified to use a Fairchild 6-390 engine (later named Ranger) and changes were made to the wing and landing gear geometry. The modified aircraft was known as the Fairchild KR-125. In 1931 a similar aircraft without the geometry changes but with a Ranger engine was sold under the designation KR-135.

In 1930, the KR-34CA, a military version of the Fairchild KR-34 based on the Kreider-Reisner C-4C Challenger design, was built in Farmingdale, New York. A light attack craft, it had two .30 caliber Browning machine guns mounted on the nose, firing through the propellers. The Chinese version had bomb racks under the fuselage. Two of this military version of the Fairchild KR-34 were sold to the warlord generals Liu Wenhui and Liu Xiang in Sichuan Province.

== Variants ==
Fairchild type numbers in brackets

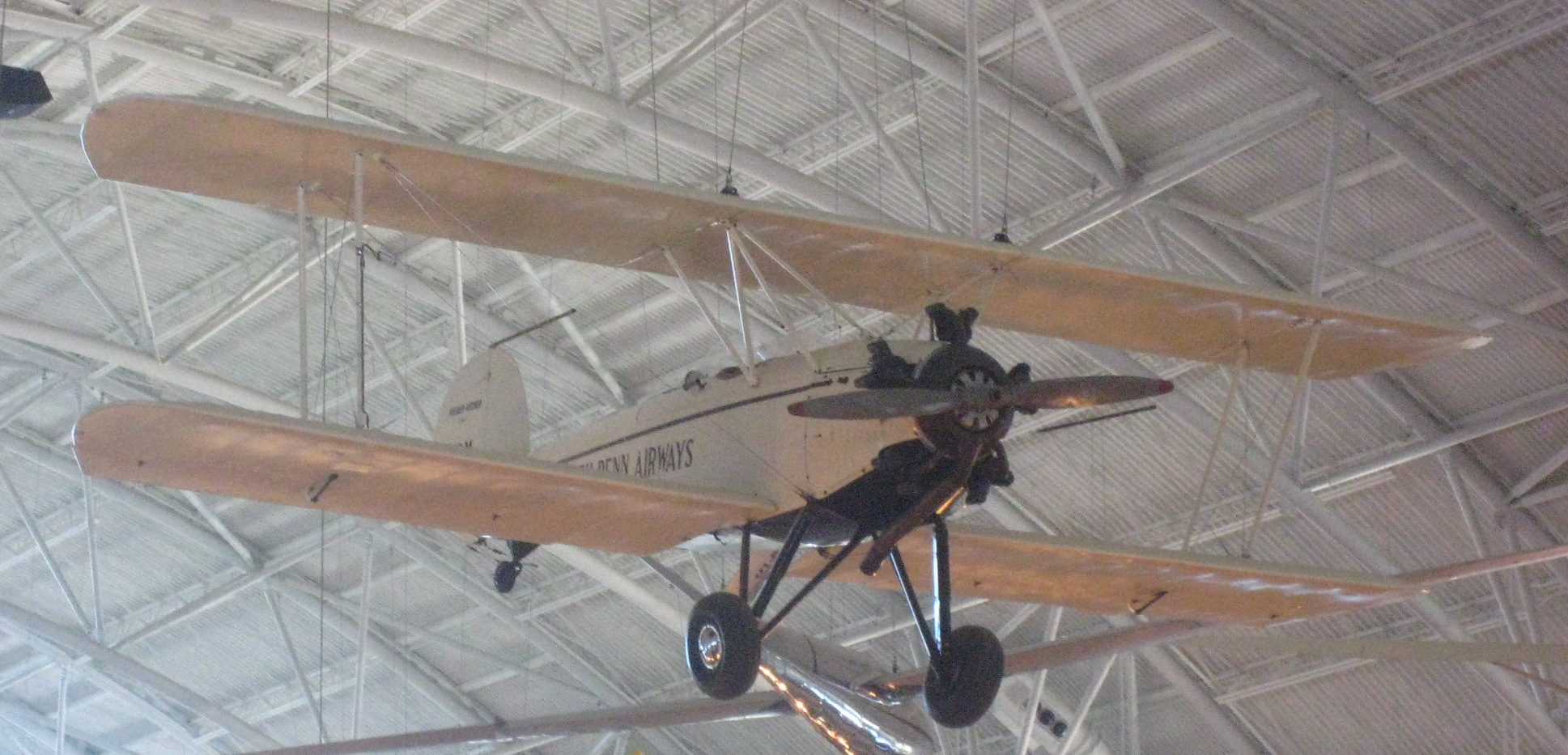
Kreider-Reisner C-4C Challenger

C-1 Challenger
90 hp (67 kW) Curtiss OX-5 V-8 engine
C-2 Challenger (KR-31)
Initial production version, with either 90 hp (67 kW) Curtiss OX-5 (KR-31A), or Hallett H-256, or Curtiss OXX-6, or Fairchild-Caminez or Warner Scarab or 100 hp (75 kW) Kinner K-5 (KR-31B).
C-2A (KR-125)
C-2 used as a testbed for the 100 hp (75 kW) Ranger 6-375 (6 cylinder L-375) inline engine.
C-3 Challenger
C-2 with detail changes and 110 hp (82 kW) Warner Scarab radial engine
C-4 Challenger (KR-34)
C-2 with numerous changes, including the elimination of the ailerons from the top wing, and new engines.

C-4B (KR-34B and KR-35B-1)
130 hp (97 kW) Comet 7-RA or 150 hp (110 kW) Comet 7-D. 4 built.
C-4C (KR-34C)
165 hp (123 kW) Wright J-6 and 165 hp (123 kW) Continental A70. roughly 60 built.
KR-34CA Attack version of C-4C for Mexico and China.
C-4D (KR-34A)
150 hp (110 kW) Wright J-6 and 165 hp (123 kW) Curtiss R-600 Challenger, 1 modified.

C-5 Challenger
C-3/C-4 with numerous changes, including the elimination of the ailerons from the top wing, and an increase in allowable weights
C-6 Challenger (KR-21)
Scaled down 110 hp (82 kW) Warner Scarab powered development with tapered wings and redesigned cabane struts.

C-6A (KR-21)
C-6 with minor detail changes but same engine.
C-6B (KR-21A)
100 hp (75 kW) Kinner K-5, or 170 hp (130 kW) Curtiss R-600 Challenger or 85 hp (63 kW) Armstrong Siddeley Genet.

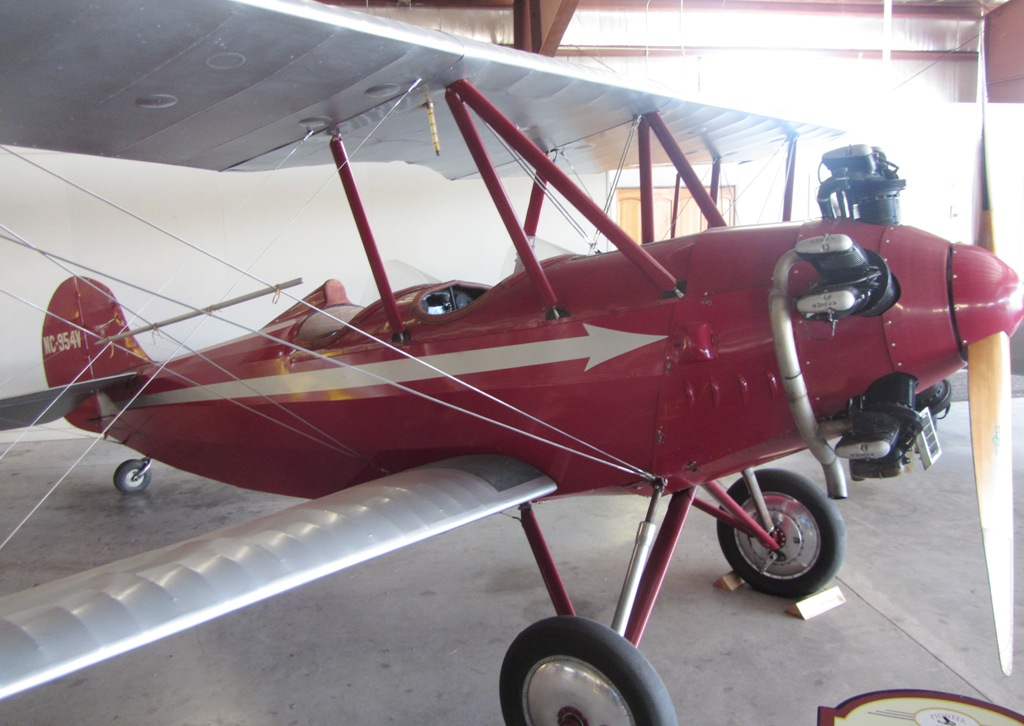
KR-21B

Parks P-1
Challenger C-2 temporarily modified with radiator between undercarriage legs. About 45 built.
Parks P-2
Challenger with 115 hp (86 kW) Axelson (company) radial and split-axle undercarriage.

Parks P-2A
165 hp (123 kW) Wright J-6-5 radial. Less than 20 built of P-2 and P-2A.

Ryan Speedster
later name for Parks P-2 and Parks 2A .
Hammond Sportster
Parks P-2A with wide track undercarriage. Seven built.

== Specifications (KR-34) ==
Data from The Illustrated Encyclopedia of Aircraft (Part Work 1982-1985), 1985, Orbis Publishing, Page 1674.

General characteristics

- Crew: two
- Length: 23 ft 2 in (7.06 m)
- Wingspan: 30 ft 1 in (9.17 m)
- Height: 9 ft 3 in (2.82 m)
- Wing area: 285 sq ft (26.48 m^{2})
- Empty weight: 1,524 lb (691 kg)
- Gross weight: 2,368 lb (1,074 kg)
- Powerplant: 1 × Wright J-6 Whirlwind Five 5-cylinder radial piston engine , 165 hp (123 kW)

Performance

- Maximum speed: 120 mph (193 km/h, 100 kn)
- Range: 510 mi (821 km, 440 nmi)
- Service ceiling: 14,000 ft (4,265 m)
