= Fairchild Dornier 428JET =

American regional jet concept (cancelled 2000)

- CG rendering of a 428JET in KLM livery.

General information
- Type: Regional Jet
- National origin: USA / Germany
- Manufacturer: Fairchild Dornier
- Status: Cancelled in August 2000
- Number built: 0

History
- Developed from: Fairchild Dornier 328JET

The Fairchild Dornier 428JET was a program undertaken by American company Fairchild Dornier to develop a 44-seat regional jet aircraft. The program was part of a broader attempt by the company to develop a family of regional jets, comprising the 328JET, 428JET, and the 728 series. This family of aircraft was designed to compete with the Bombardier CRJ and Embraer ERJ/Embraer E-Jets families. The aircraft was announced on May 19, 1998. It was cancelled in August 2000.

== Design and development ==
The 428JET would have been a stretched version of the 328JET, seating 44 in comparison to the 328JET's 34. Additionally, the two aircraft would have shared the same type rating. Plans were for the 428JET to be assembled in Israel by Israel Aerospace Industries. In the end, changing market conditions made a 44-seat airplane like the 428JET inferior to 50 seat aircraft, which have nearly the same operating and procurement costs yet higher profits due to having more seats. This caused the company to cancel the 428JET on August 8, 2000.

== Orders ==
At the time of cancellation, the aircraft had 39 firm orders with another 88 options (55 of these options could be taken on either the 328JET or 428JET). Companies ordering the airplane were Atlantic Coast Airlines (30), Skyway Airlines (5), and Air Alps Aviation (4), Air One CityLiner (2).

== Specifications ==
Data from Flug Revue

General characteristics

- Crew: 3 (2 pilots, 1 flight attendant)
- Capacity: 44
- Length: 24.69 m (81 ft 0 in)
- Wingspan: 21.78 m (71 ft 5 in)
- Height: 7.09 m (23 ft 3 in)
- Wing area: 47.8 m^{2} (515 sq ft)
- Empty weight: 11,645 kg (25,673 lb)
- Gross weight: 19,950 kg (43,982 lb)
- Max takeoff weight: 19,800 kg (43,652 lb)
- Fuel capacity: 4640kg
- Powerplant: 2 × Pratt & Whitney Canada PW308B Turbofan, 32.9 kN (7,400 lbf) thrust each

Performance

- Cruise speed: 765 km/h (475 mph, 413 kn)
- Range: 1,665 km (1,035 mi, 899 nmi)
- Service ceiling: 10,670 m (35,010 ft)

== See also ==
Related development

- Fairchild Dornier 328JET

Aircraft of comparable role, configuration, and era

- Embraer ERJ 140
