= Fairchild M-84 =

Type of aircraft

General information
- Type: Light aircraft
- National origin: United States
- Manufacturer: Fairchild Aircraft
- Designer: Armand Thieblot

History
- First flight: December 1945
- Developed from: Fairchild PT-19

The Fairchild M-84 was a four-seat cabin aircraft designed using PT-19 components.

== Design and development ==
With a large number of surplus trainers available on the post-Second World War market, Fairchild sought a way to modify its existing M-62 trainer and tooling into a four-place personal aircraft. The M-62 was a low-wing, fixed landing gear, open cockpit aircraft. The steel-tube fuselage was widened, a cabin structure was added and retractable landing gear were retrofitted using many of the same gear leg and strut parts. The wing outer panels and tail section remained unchanged. An inline engine installation was initially designed, but a Continental Motors radial was installed. With the introduction of the Beechcraft Bonanza, Ryan Navion, Bellanca Cruisair and the TEMCO F-24 at about the same time, the market was considered too saturated to produce the M-84.

== Operational history ==
The first flight occurred in December 1945. The prototype was used as an executive transport for five years. On 29 May 1951, the M-84 was donated to Washington County, Maryland with chief pilot Richard A. Henson taxiing the aircraft to the Hagerstown High School in a parade. The aircraft was never used for education and eventually was scrapped after years of vandalism.

== Specifications (M-84) ==
Data from AAHS

General characteristics

- Crew: one
- Capacity: three
- Gross weight: 3,300 lb (1,497 kg)
- Fuel capacity: 48 US gal (180 L; 40 imp gal)
- Powerplant: 1 × Continental W-670-6N Radial piston, 220 hp (160 kW)
- Propellers: 2-bladed electrically adjustable wood

Performance

- Maximum speed: 152 kn (175 mph, 282 km/h)
- Cruise speed: 130 kn (150 mph, 240 km/h)
- Range: 390 nmi (450 mi, 720 km)

Avionics

- Lear radios

== See also ==
Related development

- Fairchild PT-19
