= Lockheed Martin X-55 =

Experimental aircraft

X-55 ACCA
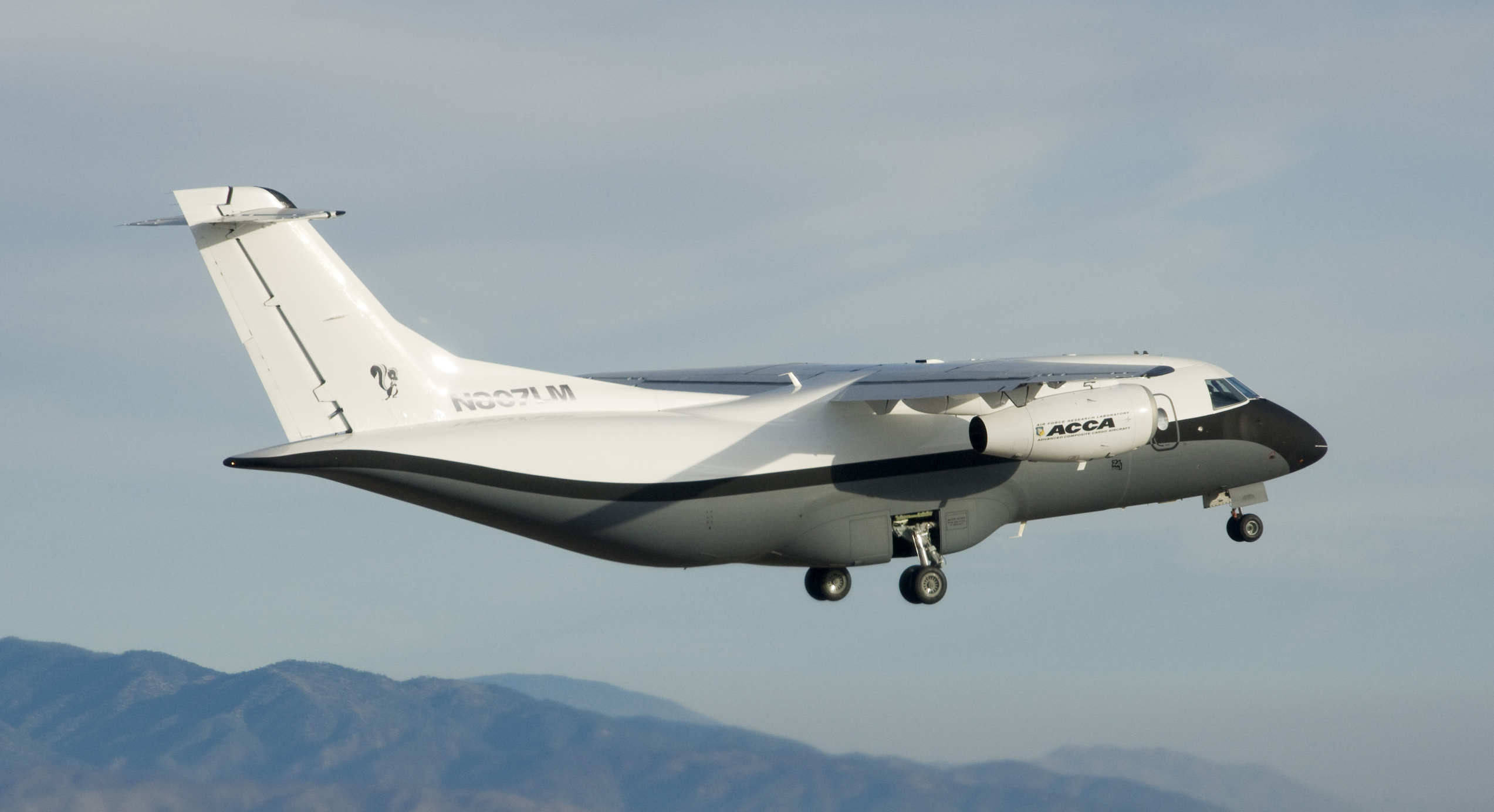

General information
- Type: Technology demonstrator
- Manufacturer: Lockheed Martin Skunk Works
- Primary user: United States Air Force
- Number built: 1

History
- First flight: 2 June 2009
- Developed from: Fairchild Dornier 328JET

The Lockheed Martin X-55 Advanced Composite Cargo Aircraft (ACCA) is an experimental twinjet transport aircraft. It is intended to demonstrate new air cargo-carrier capabilities using advanced composite materials. A project of the United States Air Force's Air Force Research Laboratory, it was built by the international aerospace company Lockheed Martin, at its Advanced Development Programs (Skunk Works) facility in Palmdale, California.

== Design and development ==
The X-55 is a one-off aircraft intended to demonstrate the use of advanced composite materials in the fuselage of an otherwise conventional high-wing transport aircraft. There are no plans to place the X-55 into production.

Lockheed Martin's design for Advanced Composite Cargo Aircraft (ACCA) was chosen over Aurora Flight Sciences' design based on the Antonov An-72 in 2007. The aircraft is powered by two Pratt & Whitney Canada PW306B turbofans. The X-55 design is based on the existing Fairchild Dornier 328JET. The fuselage of that aircraft, which is constructed of aluminium alloys, was replaced aft of the entrance door with a newly designed fuselage. The new design makes extensive use of advanced composite materials, selected to allow out of autoclave curing at lower temperatures and pressures than previous materials. The new widened fuselage allows the loading of cargo through a rear ramp.

The new fuselage section is constructed as a single large component, including the vertical stabilizer. When attached to the existing nose section, the fuselage is 55 feet (16.8 m) long and 9 feet (2.74 m) diameter. The fuselage has upper and lower halves, each with a roughly-oval shape similar to a canoe. The halves are bonded to circular frames. The fuselage section ahead of the entrance door consists of the existing (metal) 328J component, with fasteners used to bring the forward and new aft sections together.

As of April 2008, the fuselage was being fabricated. The first flight of the modified aircraft was expected during the winter of 2008/2009. However, due to a "glitch" during fabricating the composite fuselage, that schedule slipped. The delay was caused by an unsatisfactory bond of the skin on the lower fuselage, which required a second fuselage to be fabricated.

The first flight was completed at Lockheed Martin's Advanced Development Programs facility (Air Force Plant 42) in Palmdale, California on June 2, 2009 by the Air Force Research Laboratory in conjunction with Lockheed Martin. In October 2009, the ACCA demonstrator was designated X-55A by the USAF. Over the course of the program, 15 to 20 flights were expected. Furthermore, it was estimated that the vehicle was built for half the cost of a conventional design for a similar aircraft.

== Aircraft on display ==
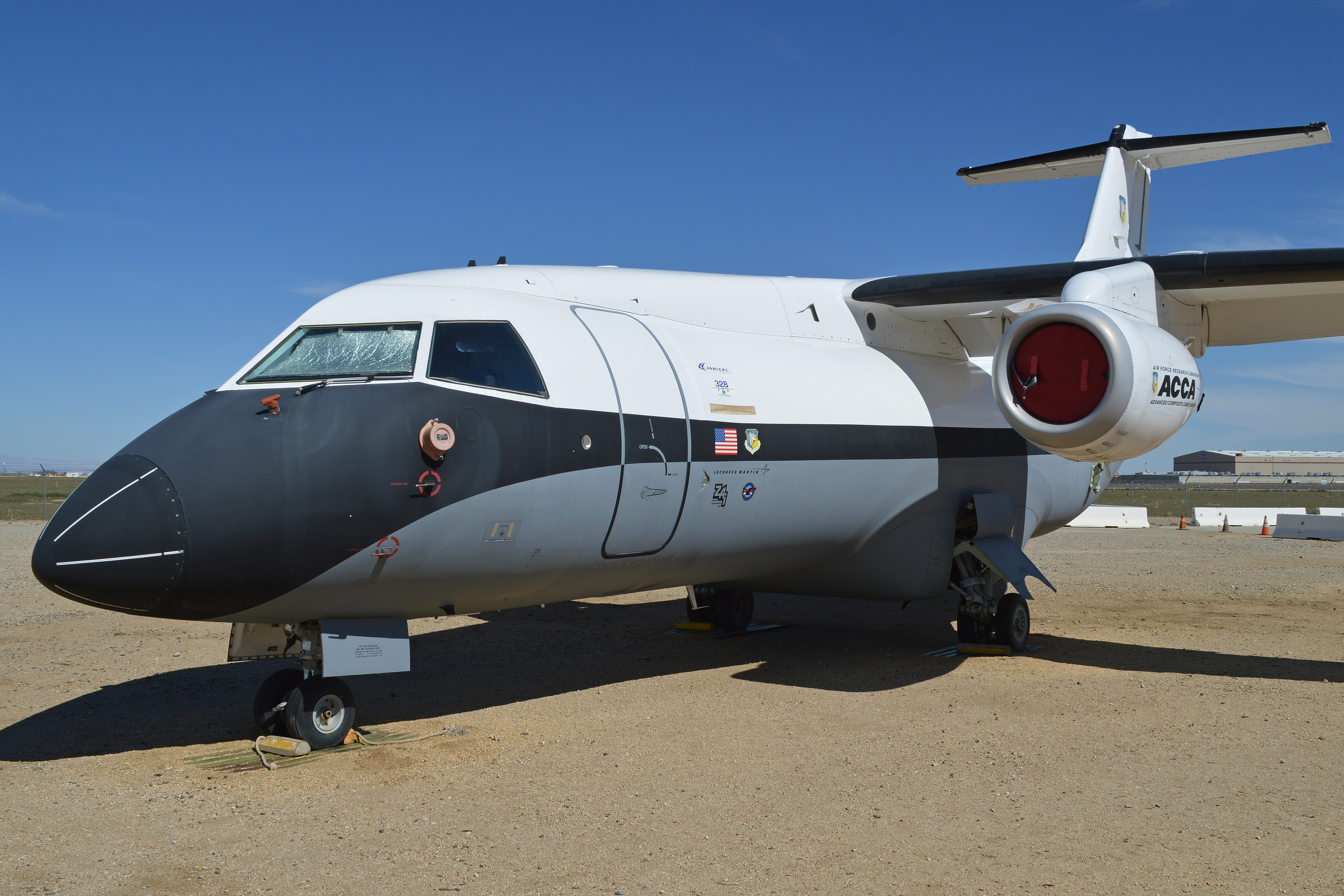
X-55 (N807LM) on display at Joe Davies Heritage Airpark.

As of September 12, 2014, the X-55 aircraft is on display at the Joe Davies Heritage Airpark in Palmdale, California.

== See also ==
Related development

- Fairchild Dornier 328JET
