= Kreider-Reisner Midget =

Racing monoplane

Midget
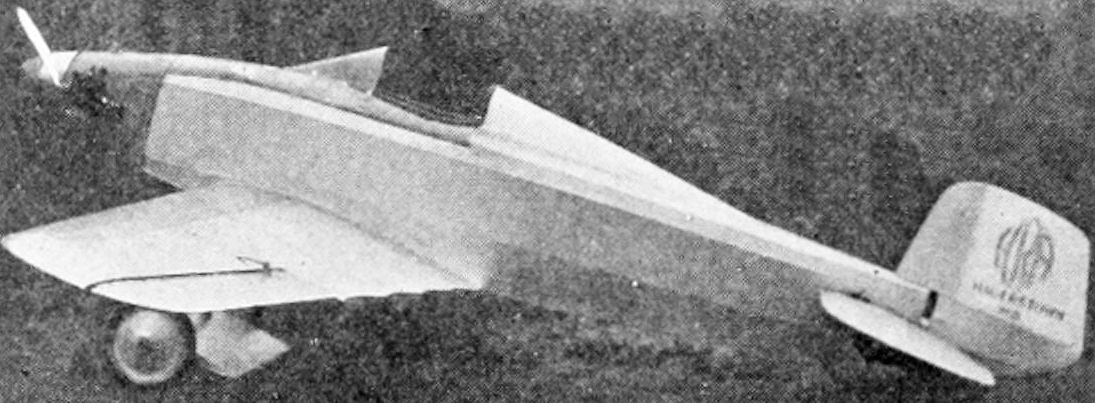

General information
- Type: Light racing monoplane
- National origin: United States
- Manufacturer: Kreider-Reisner Aircraft Company
- Designer: F.E. Seiler assisted by A.H. Kreider and George Hardman
- Number built: 1

History
- First flight: 1926

The Kreider-Reisner Midget was an American light racing monoplane, the first aircraft designed by the Kreider-Reisner Aircraft Company of Hagerstown, Maryland.

== Design and development ==
The Midget was a low-wing racing monoplane powered by a 29 hp (22 kW) Wright-Morehouse engine which first flew in 1926. Designed by Charles W Meyers and engineered by Frederick E. Seiler, Jr., it should not be confused with the Meyers Midget a high-wing monoplane built in the Kreider-Reisner factory for Meyers in the same year. The Midget won the Scientific American Trophy at the 1926 Nationals.

== Specifications ==
Data from Aerofiles, Aero Digest November 1926

General characteristics

- Crew: 1
- Length: 15 ft 2 in (4.62 m)
- Wingspan: 20 ft 0 in (6.10 m)
- Height: 4 ft 6 in (1.37 m)
- Wing area: 55.5 sq ft (5.16 m^{2})
- Empty weight: 289 lb (131 kg)
- Gross weight: 490 lb (222 kg) with 170 lb (77 kg) load
- Powerplant: 1 × Wright-Morehouse WM-80 2-cylinder air-cooled horizontally-opposed piston engine, 29 hp (22 kW) at 2,500 rpm
- Propellers: 2-bladed fixed-pitch propeller

Performance

- Maximum speed: 115 mph (185 km/h, 100 kn)
- Cruise speed: 90 mph (140 km/h, 78 kn)
- Stall speed: 45 mph (72 km/h, 39 kn)
- g limits: 9 (ultimate load)
- Wing loading: 8.33 lb/sq ft (40.7 kg/m^{2})
- Power/mass: 0.058 hp/lb (0.095 kW/kg)
- Fuel consumption: 60 mpg_{‑US} (72 mpg_{‑imp}; 26 km/L) at cruise speed
