= Fairchild Dornier 728 family =

American regional jet concept (cancelled 2002)

Fairchild Dornier 528 / 728 / 928
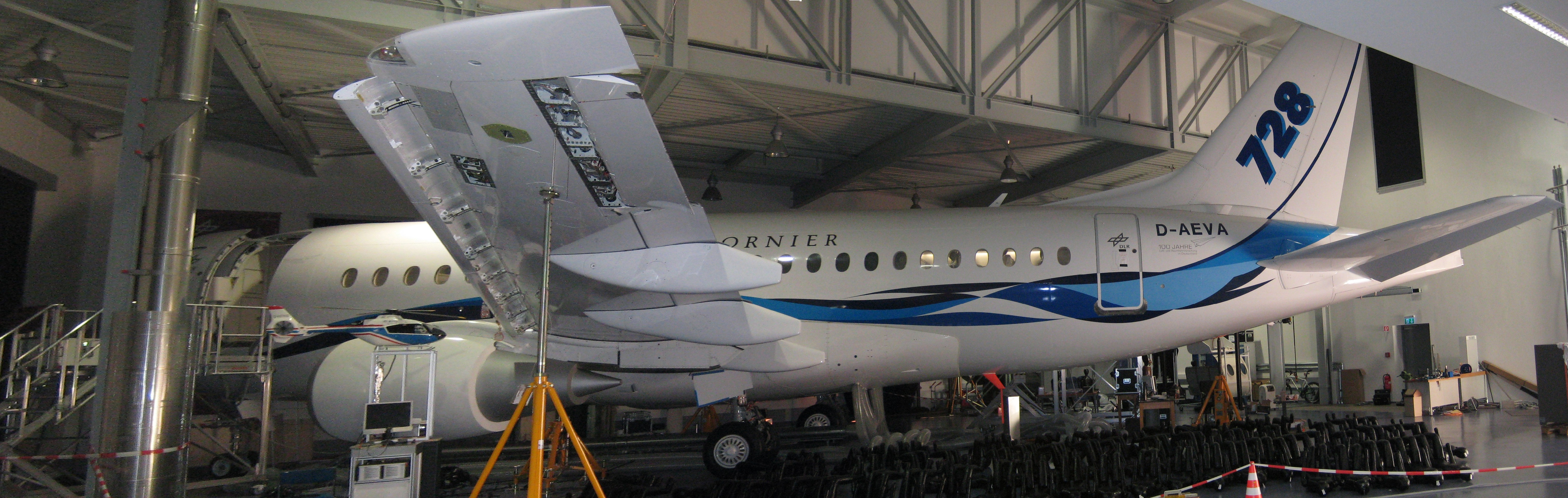
- Fairchild Dornier 728 prototype TAC 01

General information
- Type: Regional jet Airliner
- National origin: Germany
- Manufacturer: Fairchild Dornier GmbH
- Status: Programme cancelled
- Number built: 3 prototypes built to various stages of completion

The Fairchild Dornier 728/928 family is a series of jet-powered regional airliners that was being developed by German-American aviation conglomerate Fairchild Dornier.

It was a relatively ambitious bid to develop a group of aircraft that would have seated between 50 and 110 passengers, supplementing the existing 328JET series, a smaller regional jet. The 728/928 family is a monoplane design with fixed wings in low wing configuration and two engines mounted under the wings. It has a retractable undercarriage (or landing gear) in tricycle configuration. On 21 March 2002, the roll-out of the first 728 took place. The company planned its maiden flight to occur during the summer of 2002 and for deliveries to commence during mid-2003 to the launch customer Lufthansa Cityline.

The 728 family benefitted from a modern design while the company attracted considerable interest from various airlines upon the programme's launch. By March 2002, a total of eight customers had altogether placed 125 firm orders in addition to signed options for an additional 164 aircraft. However, the programme was derailed at a late stage by the April 2002 insolvency of Fairchild Dornier, which occurred just days after the official roll-out of the first 728. Despite attempts to revive the programme, including the establishment of Fairchild Dornier Aeroindustries, customers opted to cancel their orders and no aircraft actually ever flew. The three prototypes that were completed have been sold on for other purposes.

== Development ==
=== Origins ===
During the mid-1990s, German aircraft manufacturer Dornier Luftfahrt GmbH experienced considerable financial difficulties; these heavily contributed to the company's acquisition by the American aerospace firm Fairchild Aircraft, after which the organisation became Fairchild Dornier. Shortly thereafter, the company began reorganising itself and examined possibilities for altering its product lineup. The first new aircraft to make it to market, the Fairchild Dornier 328JET, was a relatively straightforward reengining of the turboprop-powered Dornier 328; however, even prior to its first flight, the company had grander ambitions of producing a range of larger regional airliners.

During October 1997, Fairchild Dornier announced what would become the 728 programme, which was initially known as the X28JET project and later publicly rebranded as the 728JET, at the Dubai Airshow. The new family of regional jets, the 528JET, 728JET and 928JET, seating from 55 to 100 passengers was launched at the ILA Berlin Aerospace Show (International Aviation and Space Flight Exhibition) in Berlin on 19 May 1998; prior to this, Fairchild Dornier had received provisional launch orders from German flag carrier Lufthansa, who placed 60 firm orders along with 60 options, and Swiss airline Crossair.

The total investment in the programme, which was sourced from Fairchild Dornier's own funds and from its risk-sharing partners, was reported as being $850 million. According to company President Jim Robinson, $220 million alone was fronted by the suppliers of the wing, fuselage and empennage, while efforts to secure further launch aid from both vendors and the German federal government were also underway. One option explored was to take the company public. Various partnership arrangements were explored; at one stage, Fairchild Dornier were holding discussions with Franko-Italian regional aircraft manufacturer ATR on the topic of collaborating on the 728. At the time of launch, the company anticipated delivery of the initial production aircraft to take place during mid-2001, with type certification being achieved in the same year.

=== Testing phase ===
During October 2000, testing of the "Iron Bird", a mechanical/hydraulic full-scale test rig of the 728, commenced. According to the company, this rig was intended to help the company to reduce the development and certification processes by between 150 and 200 hours; it was also envisaged the rebuilding of the iron bird to represent the larger 928 to similarly support its development. Similarly, Fairchild Dornier heavily invested in computer simulations of the production and assembly procedures at Oberpfaffenhofen, which were intended to yield major savings in terms of both cost and manpower and costs; this effort was reportedly responsible for reducing the man-hours involved in the 728's manufacture by 60%. Advanced manufacturing equipment was also procured for similar reasons.

During mid-2001, Fairchild Dornier commenced construction of the first prototype, the majority of structural assemblies having been delivered by September 2001. During December 2001, Fairchild Dornier reportedly completed the first fuselage. By January 2002, the first prototype was sufficiently complete to begin taxiing on its own landing gear. During March 2002, the official roll out of "TAC 01" (Test Aircraft 01) - the first prototype - occurred, at which point it was presented to the public for the first time. That same month, TAC 03 was transported to IABG in Ottobrunn for structural testing.

During June 2001, it was reported that leasing firm GECAS placed a firm order for 50 aircraft, as well as additional options up to 100 aircraft. By March 2002, a total of eight customers, among them Lufthansa Cityline, GECAS, Bavaria Leasing, CSA-Czech Airlines, Atlantic Coast Airlines, and SolAir, had reportedly placed a cumulative 125 firm orders for the type, as well as signed options for an additional 164 aircraft. According to Fairchild Dornier, it needed to sell 200 aircraft to reach the programme's break-even point.

The lead aircraft of the programme was the 70-to-85 seat 728, which was referred to as the 728JET early on. Assembly of the aircraft was performed at Fairchild Dornier's facility in Oberpfaffenhofen, Germany. On 21 March 2002, the first 728 conducted its official roll-out; it was scheduled to perform its maiden flight during the summer of 2002. Furthermore, deliveries of the type were expected to commence during mid-2003, the launch customer being Lufthansa Cityline. However, only two days before the roll-out, it was announced that the programme would be set back by two months due to a shortage of available funds. A week later, reports emerged that the company was in talks with four potential new strategic partners, and that securing at least one was of "critical and crucial" importance.

=== Termination ===
Prior to the intended date of the 728's first flight being performed, Fairchild Dornier was rendered insolvent and forced to declare bankruptcy on 2 April 2002. One consequence of this was the whole programme being immediately brought to a standstill; shortly thereafter, both Lufthansa and GECAS chose to cancel their orders for the type. The withdrawal of the 728's two biggest customers was a considerable blow to the programme, potentially putting off investors and partners that were being sought out at this time.

During July 2003, D'Long International Strategic Investment Group of Xinjiang, China showed an interest in purchasing a stake the project. A new entity, Fairchild Dornier Aeroindustries, was formed with the aim of completing development of the aircraft, however, this company also filed for bankruptcy during 2004. During this brief revival, no additional aircraft were produced, although structural tests in Dresden were commenced during 2003.

== Design ==
The Fairchild Dornier 728 is a relatively conventional airliner in terms of its design, being equipped with a low-mounted wing and powered by a pair of turbofan engines that were mounted in underwing pods beneath the wings. Common to most airliners, it has a monoplane configuration and is furnished with a retractable undercarriage in a tricycle configuration. The flight control surfaces are located at the trailing edge of the wings, such as the Ailerons, and at its empennage, such as the stabilizers.

The wing of the 728 was a derivative of the "Tragflügel Neuer Technologie" (TNT) (English: Wing of New Technology) wing configuration that had been originally developed by Dornier for their earlier Dornier 228 utility aircraft. While much of the wing design is a straightforward, if scaled-up, implementation of TNT, it was furnished with novel "Super Shark" blended winglets, which were developed and incorporated into the wing around 2001/2002. The low-mounted position of the wing was uncommon amongst Dornier-built aircraft; prior aircraft designs, including the Do 28, Dornier 228 and Dornier 328, had all featured wings that were mounted in a high position relative to the fuselage.

As a means of preventing low-cost carriers from equipping the 728 with six-abreast seating, instead of Cityline's five-abreast seating, Lufthansa pressured Fairchild Dornier to reduce the diameter of the fuselage; this was shrunk from the original 3.40 m (11 ft 2 in) to 3.25 m (10 ft 8 in). The reduction also lowered the weight of the aircraft, but motivated Crossair to move towards the rival Embraer E-Jet family instead; Crossair eventually cancelled their order for the 728, attributing this decision to have been a result of the revised fuselage layout.

During August 1998, Fairchild Dornier announced it had selected General Electric's FADEC-equipped CF34-8D (which has 87% parts commonality with the CF34-8C1 selected to power the competing Bombardier CRJ700 series), ahead of the SNECMA/Pratt & Whitney Canada SPW-14 to power the 728. During September 1998, further 728 suppliers were announced, including Honeywell for its Primus Epic integrated EFIS avionics suite with flat panel LCDs, AlliedSignal to provide the auxiliary power unit (APU) and environmental control system, Lucas Aerospace for the fly-by-wire flight control system, BFGoodrich manufactured elements such as the landing gear, wheels, tyres, brakes and fuel system, Hamilton Sundstrand for the integrated electric system, and Parker Aerospace for the hydraulic systems. Spanish aircraft manufacturer Construcciones Aeronáuticas SA (CASA) was subcontracted to manufacture the wings and empennage of the 728.

The basic version of the 728, referred to as the 728-100, would have been followed around the end of 2003 by the 728–200, which would have featured an extended range capability along with a higher payload capacity. In the weeks prior to the company's insolvency, reports emerged that work on the 728-100 had been abandoned in favour of the more capable 728–200. Development and marketing of the stretched 928 model also continued. However, the 528 ultimately received little interest from the airlines, leading to it being quietly removed from the family plan.

== Operational history ==
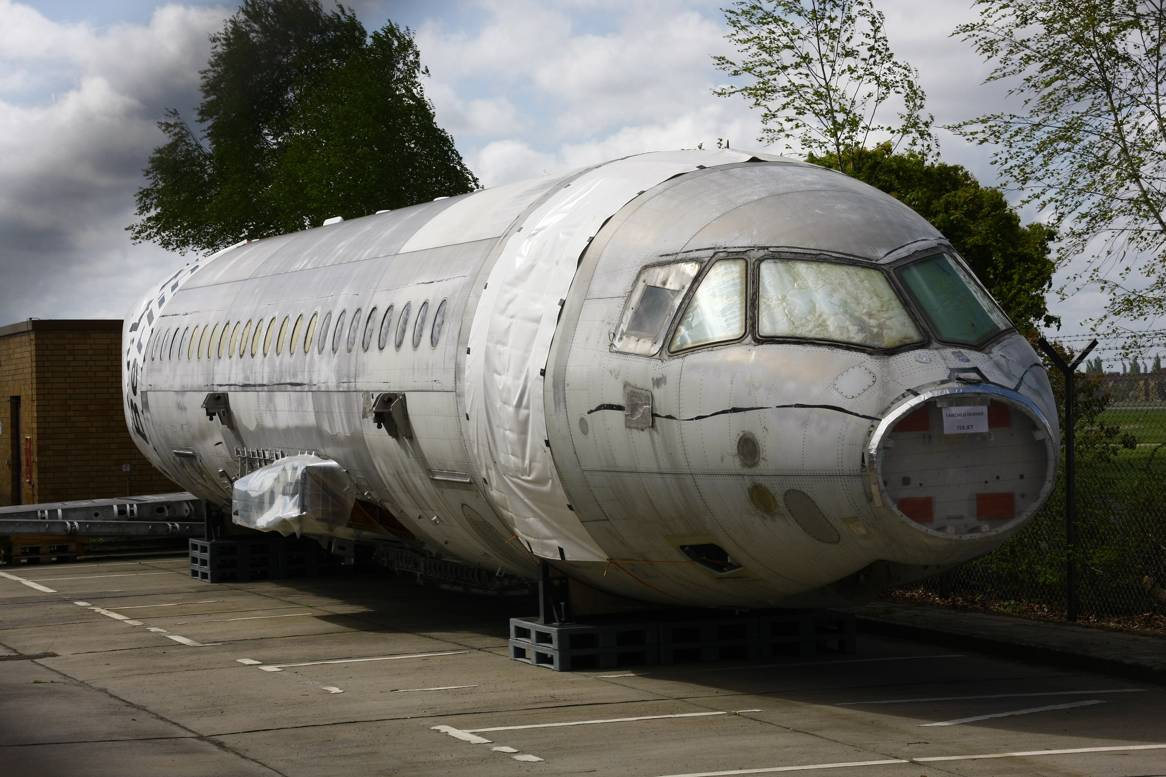
Fuselage of TAC 02 at Berlin Tempelhof Airport.

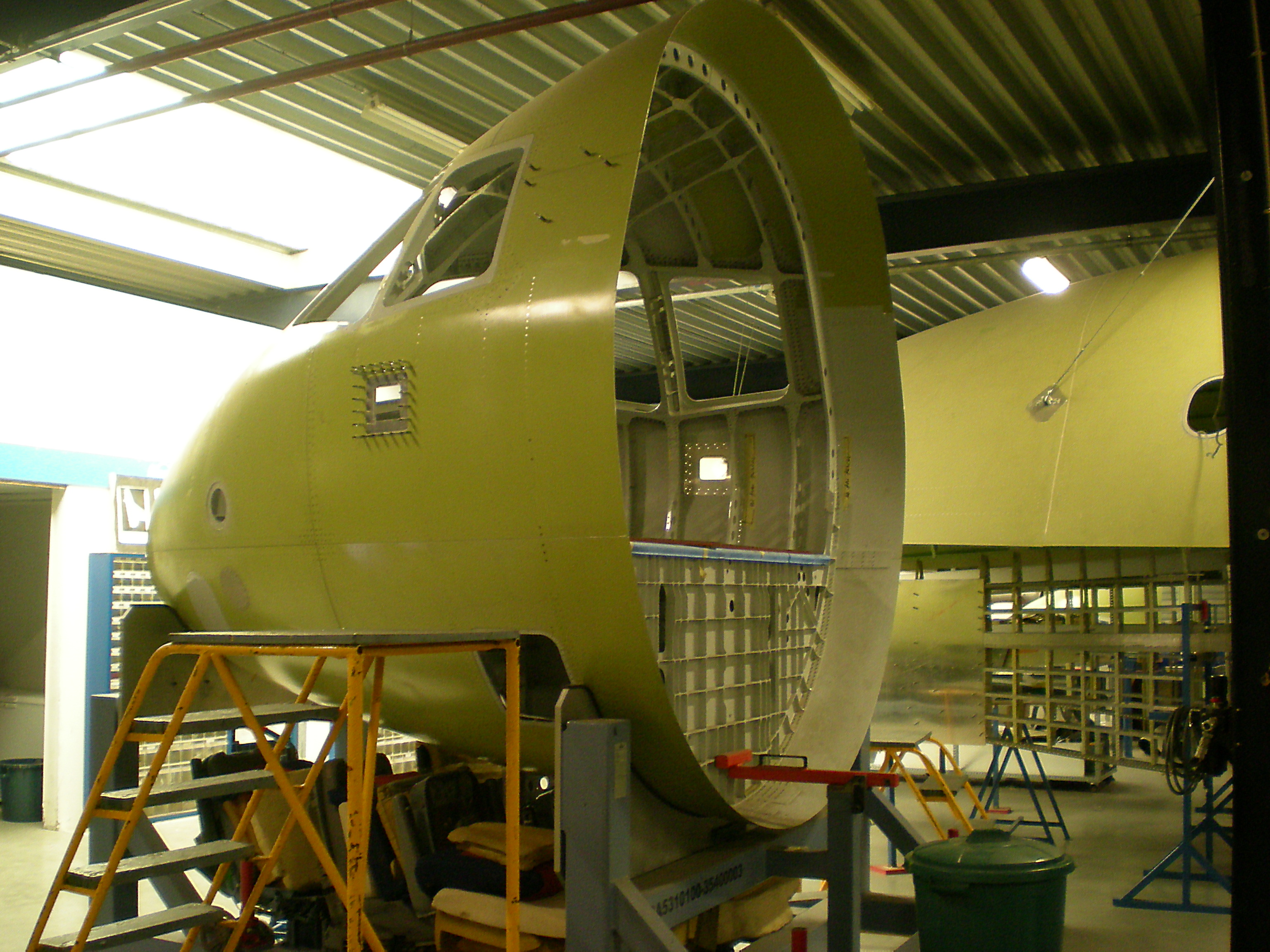
Cockpit module for what was intended to be the 6th aircraft.

Three prototypes, TAC 01 - TAC 03 (Test aircraft) were built. TAC 01 was completed with equipment, the second prototype was a complete fuselage in an unfinished stage of installation. TAC 03 was just a fuselage for structural tests. It was brought to Dresden before the insolvency of Fairchild Dornier.

The auction sold (besides many other things) also the prototypes.

- The German Aerospace Center (DLR) in Göttingen purchased TAC 01 for €19,000. It was sought for cabin testing, which meant the DLR only required the fuselage. After deciding it was too complicated to remove the wings correctly, they were cut off. Therefore, the fuselage went to the DLR research facilities with "stubby wings" of 6 m span.
- TAC 02 belongs to Deutsches Technikmuseum Berlin now owns the fuselage.
- TAC 03 remained in Technik Museum Speyer.

== Variants ==
All of the variants planned a high degree of commonality, including engine type, and flightdeck, which would have allowed for a common pilot type rating.

=== 728 ===
The 728-100 was to have a passenger capacity of 70 to 85. The 728 had the largest cabin in its class, being 0.51 m wider than the Embraer 170/190, and 0.70 m wider than the CRJ-700) with five-abreast seating. The 200 was planned to have a 3,000 kg (6615 lbs) higher MTOW and a 750 km (400 NM) increase in range. Uprated CF34-8D3 engines were to be used on the 728–200, in place of the CF34-8D1 engines used in the 728–100.

=== 928 ===
Planned to follow the 728 into service, the 928 had a stretched fuselage that would have enabled the aircraft to achieve a passenger capacity of 95 to 110 seats. The first flight was scheduled for late 2003 with entry into service in 2005. The 928 featured an increased wing span and more powerful GE CF-34-10 engines. A 928-100 version, as well as a 928-200 version that had an increased maximum takeoff weight (MTOW), was planned.

=== 1128 ===
The 1128, sometimes referred to as 1128JET, was an envisaged further stretch of the 928 to accommodate roughly 110 to 120 passengers.

=== 528 ===
The 528 was to have a shortened 23.38 m (76 ft 9 in) fuselage length and 15.84 m (52 ft 0 in) cabin length would have followed the 928. Passenger capacity was envisioned to be 55 to 65 seats.

=== Envoy 7 ===
Fairchild Dornier also launched a corporate jet version of the 728, referred to as the Envoy 7, which was foreseen to enter service around 2004. The Envoy 7 would have featured intercontinental range and would be equipped with Fairchild Dornier's "Super Shark" winglets. Corporate versions of the 528 and 928, marketed as the Envoy 5 and Envoy 9 respectively, were also planned for.

=== Airborne Early Warning ===
Fairchild Dornier unveiled an airborne early warning and control (AEW&C) variant of the 728 during mid-2001. The company proposed developing the aircraft in conjunction with American defense firm Northrop Grumman, outfitted it with the radar and other systems of the E-2 Hawkeye; it also envisioned the development of further special mission variants, such as maritime patrol aircraft and an aerial refuelling tanker.

== Specifications ==
	528	728	928
Wingspan	27.12 m (89 ft 0 in)		28.81 m (94 ft 6 in)
Wing sweep	23.5 degrees		
Length	23.80 m (78 ft 1 in)	27.04 m (88 ft 9 in)	30.96 m (101 ft 7 in)
Height	9.05 m (29 ft 8 in)		9.77 m (32 ft 1 in)
Cabin width	3.25 m (10 ft 8 in)		
Typical cruise speed		Mach 0.81	Mach 0.8
Maximum cruise speed		Mach 0.82	
Operating range	2,963 km (1,841 mi; 1,600 nmi)	3,300 km (2,100 mi; 1,800 nmi)	3,565 km (2,215 mi; 1,925 nmi)
Empty Weight		20,435 kg (45,051 lb)	28,530 kg (62,900 lb)
Max Takeoff Weight	30,990 kg (68,320 lb)	35,200 kg (77,600 lb)	44,500 kg (98,100 lb)
Service Ceiling	11,280 m (37,010 ft)		
Engine Options (2x)	GE CF34-8D1; 52.8 kN (11,900 lbf)	GE CF34-8D3; 55.6 kN (12,500 lbf)	GE CF34-10D; 75.6 kN (17,000 lbf)
Passengers (max)	55-65	70-80	95-110
Cockpit Crew	2		

(Performance data is estimated as the aircraft was not flight tested when the program was cancelled.)

== See also ==
Related development

- Fairchild Dornier 328JET
- Fairchild Dornier 428JET

Aircraft of comparable role, configuration, and era

- Airbus A320 family
- Antonov An-148/158
- British Aerospace 146
- Boeing 737
- Bombardier CRJ
- Embraer E-Jet family
- Fokker 70/100
- Sukhoi Superjet 100
