= Fairchild Aircraft =

American aerospace manufacturing company (1925–2003)

- Type: Aircraft manufacturer
- Founded: 1925; 101 years ago
- Founder: Sherman Fairchild
- Defunct: 2003; 23 years ago
- Fate: Acquired by M7 Aerospace
- Successor: M7 Aerospace
- Headquarters: San Antonio, Texas, U.S.
- Key people: Walter Tydon
- Subsidiaries: ArmaLite (1954–1962); Fairchild Aircraft Ltd. (1920–1950); Ranger Engines Division

Fairchild was an American aircraft and aerospace manufacturing company based at various times in Farmingdale, New York; Hagerstown, Maryland; and San Antonio, Texas.

== History ==
=== Early aircraft ===
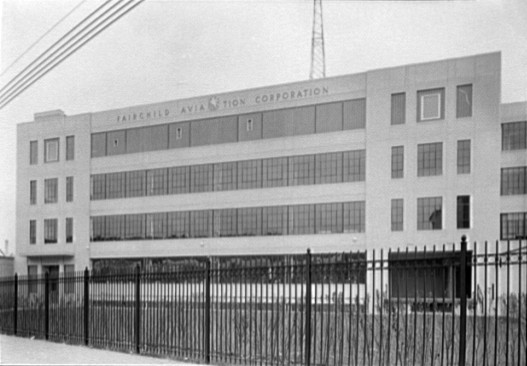
The Jamaica, Queens Fairchild plant in 1941

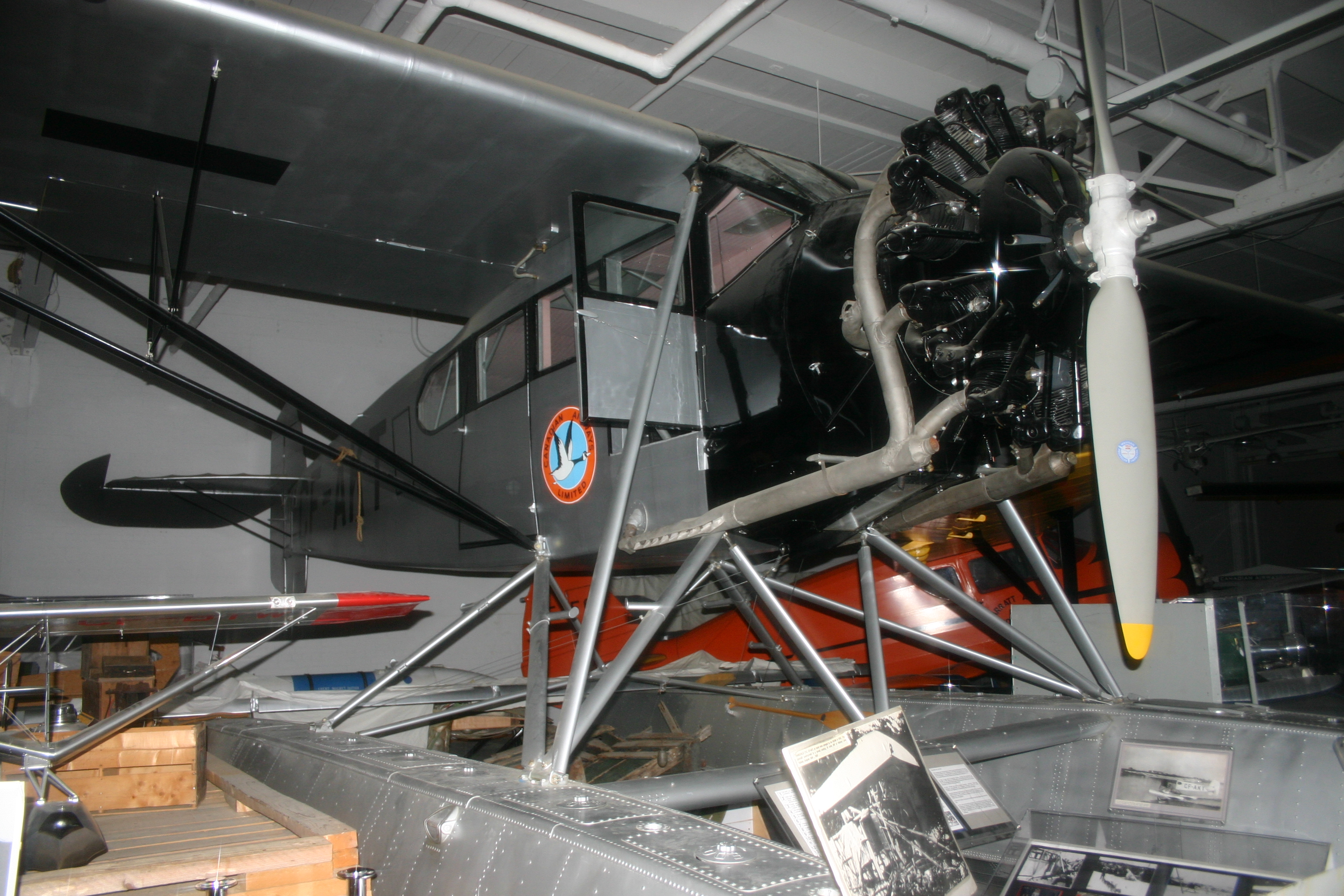
The Western Canada Aviation Museum's Fairchild 71C

The company was founded by Sherman Fairchild in 1924 as Fairchild Aviation Corporation, based in Farmingdale, and East Farmingdale, New York. It was established as the parent company for Fairchild's many aviation interests. The company produced the first US aircraft to include a fully enclosed cockpit and hydraulic landing gear, the Fairchild FC-1. At some point, it was also known as the Fairchild Aircraft Manufacturing Company. The Fairchild Aircraft Ltd. of Longueuil, Quebec, Canada was an aircraft manufacturer during the period of 1920 to 1950, which served as a subsidiary of the Fairchild company of the United States. The Fairchild Engine Company was formed with the purchase of the Caminez Engine Company in 1925. In 1929, Sherman Fairchild purchased a majority stock interest in Kreider-Reisner Aircraft Company of Hagerstown, Maryland. The company moved to Hagerstown in 1931.

A series of related designs beginning with the Fairchild FC-1 and continuing to the Fairchild 71 were designed for aerial photography as a result of dissatisfaction towards available aircraft which were incapable of flying steadily enough at a sufficient altitude. In 1935, Fairchild was hired by the US government to do aerial photograph surveys of the United States to track soil erosion and its effects.

A Fairchild FC-2 was used by Richard E. Byrd during his Antarctic Expedition.

=== World War II ===
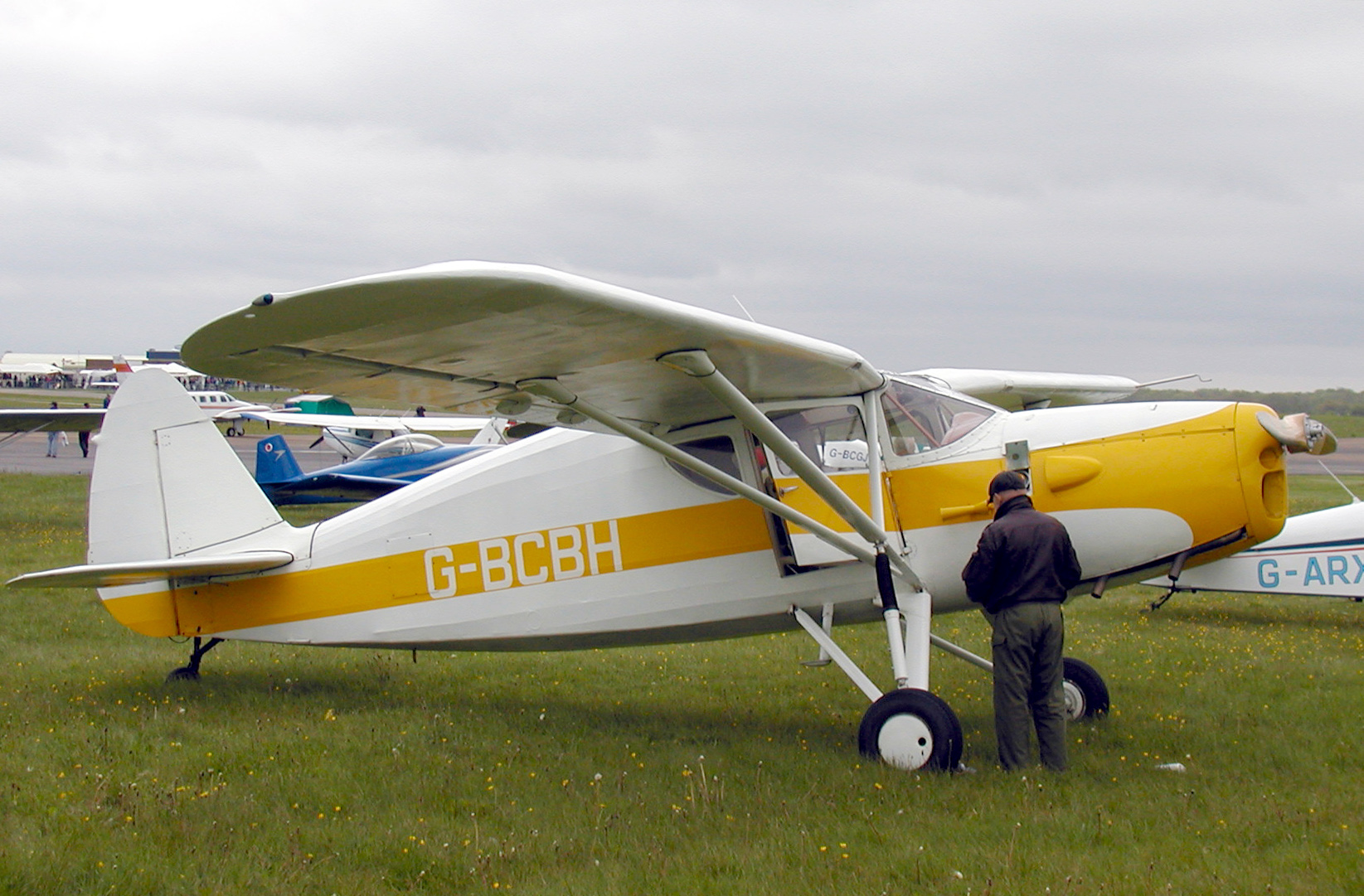
1944 model Fairchild 24 Argus III

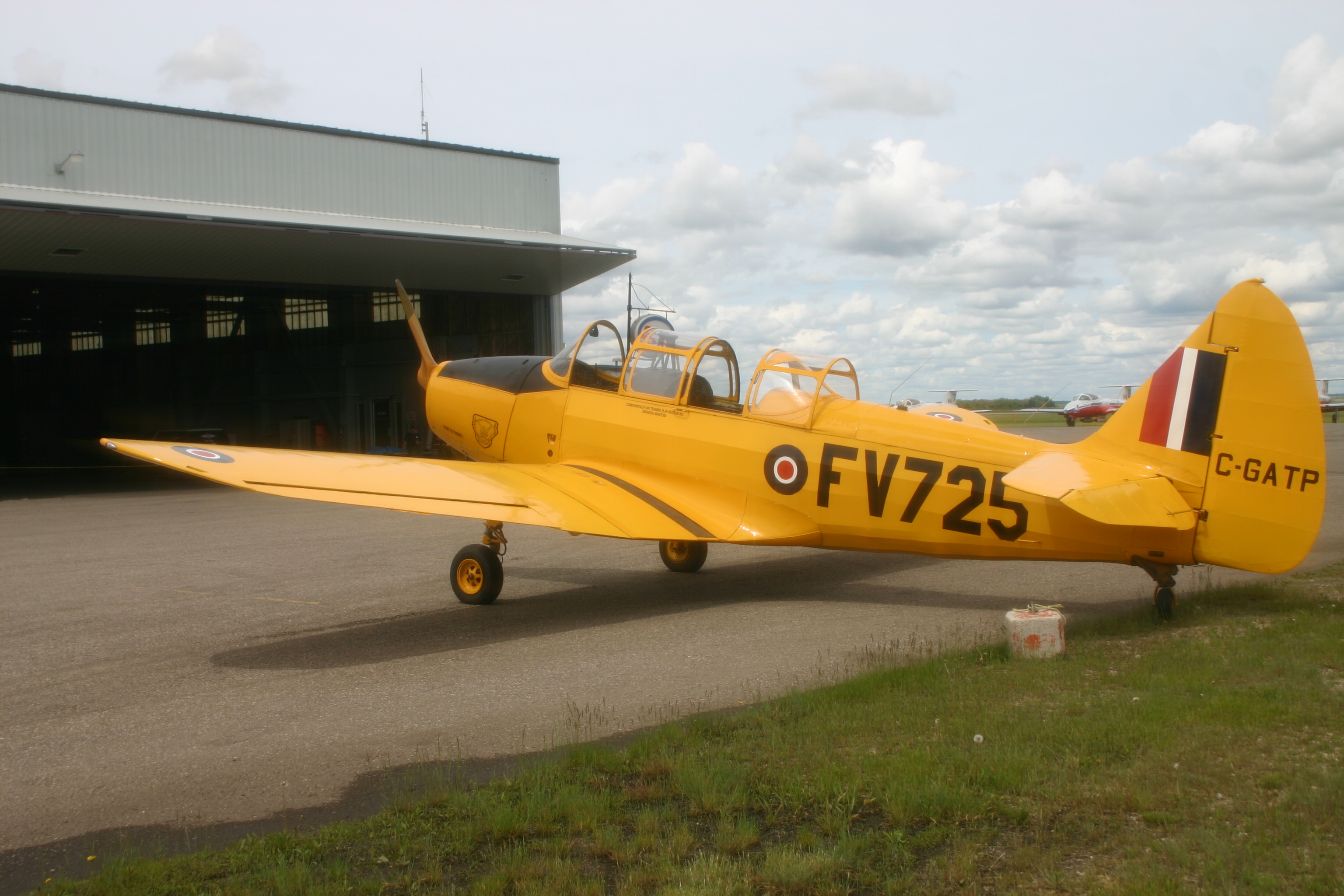
The Commonwealth Air Training Plan Museum's Fairchild Cornell

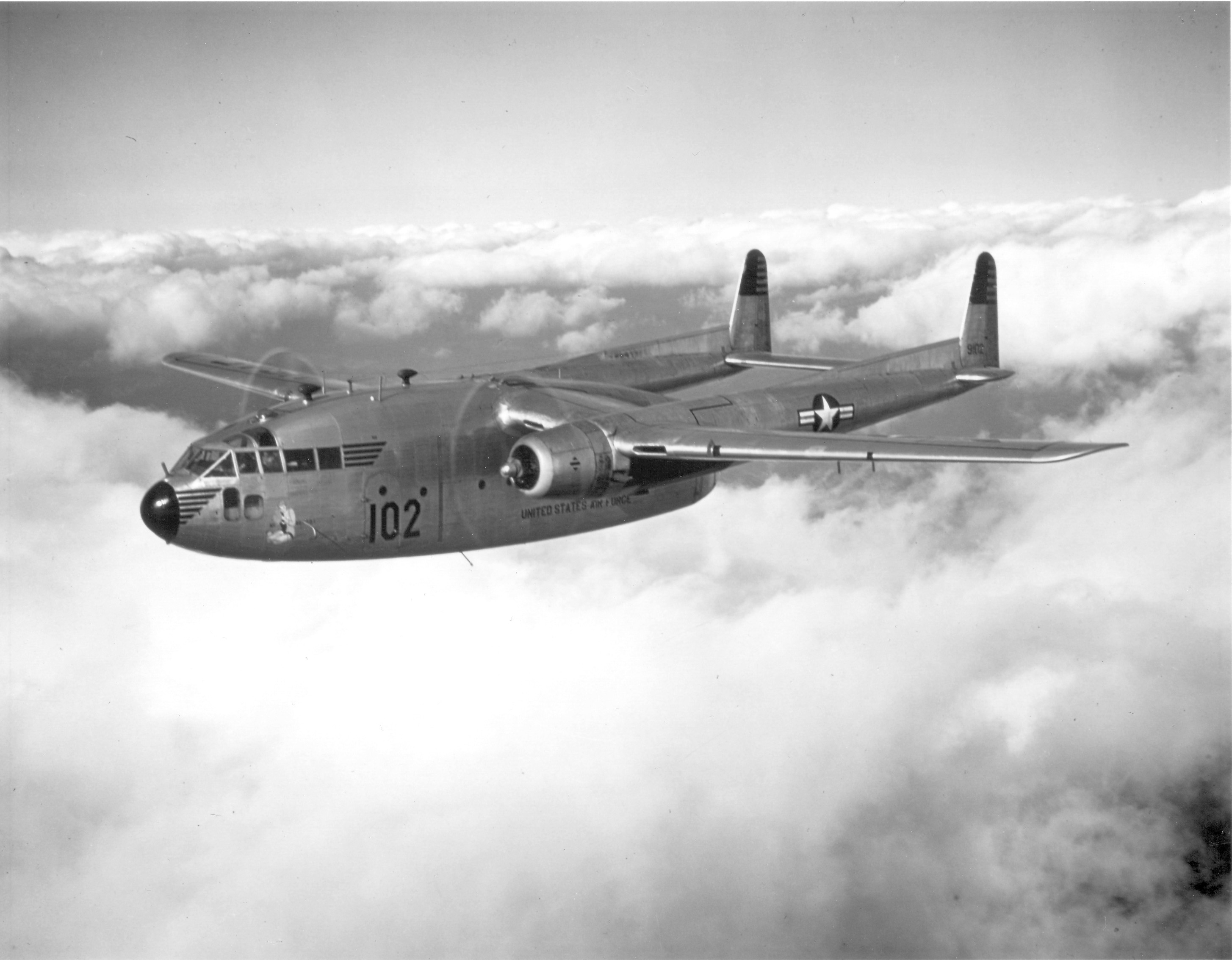
314th Troop Carrier Group C-119 Flying Boxcars

During World War II, Fairchild produced PT-19/PT-23/PT-26 (Cornell) and AT-21 Gunner trainers, C-82 Packet transports and drones. The Fairchild AT-21 Gunner, a twin-engine trainer, was manufactured at a former rayon mill in Burlington, North Carolina. Also large numbers of the Fairchild 24 (C-61/Argus) were produced for the military (principally as the Argus for the Royal Air Force), and continued production after the war for the civilian market. Fairchild ranked 73rd among United States corporations in the value of World War II military production contracts.

=== Postwar ===
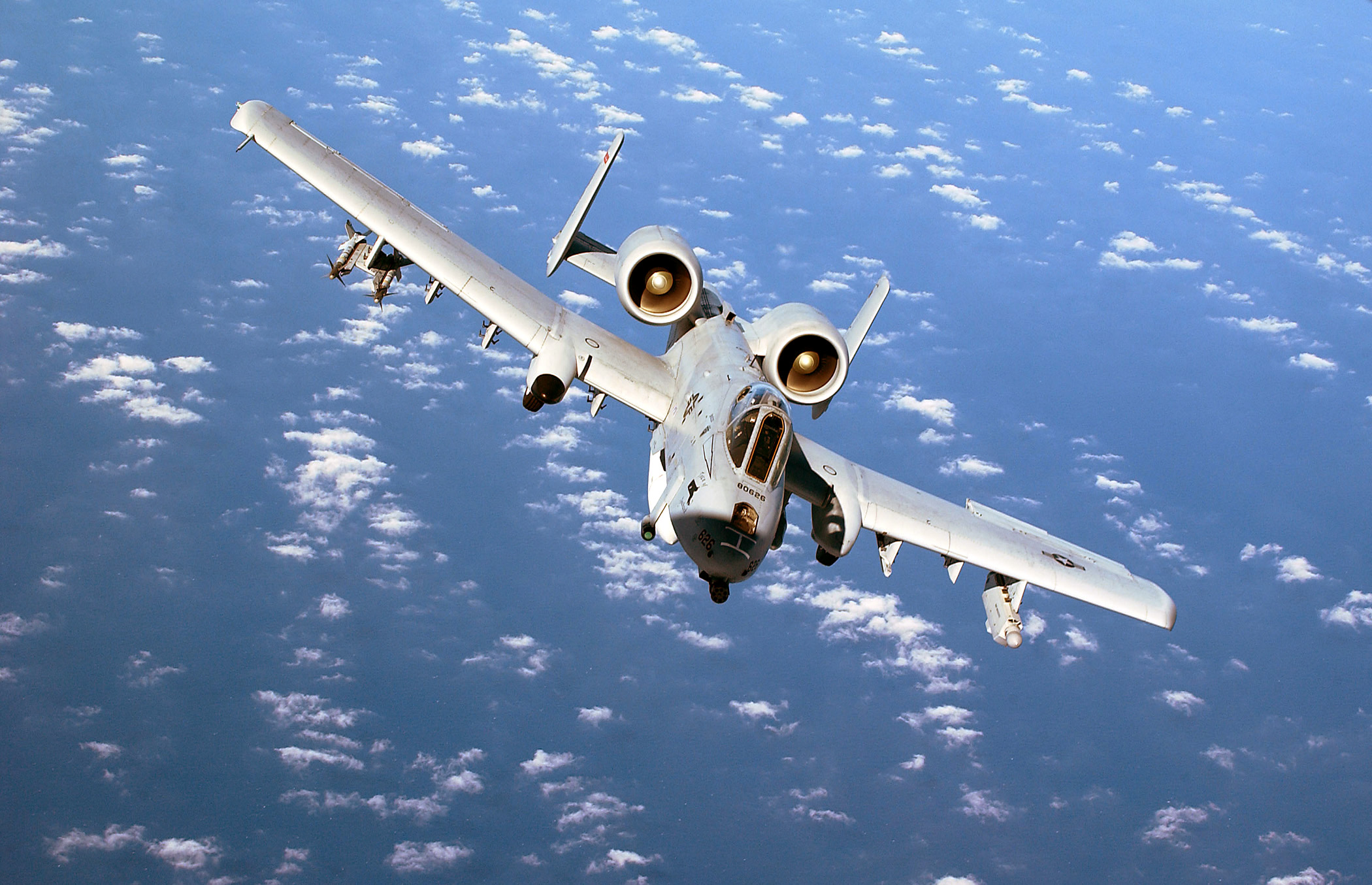
A-10 Thunderbolt II

The C-82 Packet led to the C-119 Flying Boxcar, another U.S. military transport aircraft. The C-119 could carry cargo, personnel, stretcher patients and mechanized equipment with the ability to make "paradrops" of cargo and troops. The first C-119 made its initial flight in November 1947, and by the time production ceased in 1955, more than 1,100 C-119s had been built for use in the USAF, the Royal Canadian Air Force and others. Many were converted into waterbombers after being retired from military service.

In 1949, the Hagerstown, Maryland, Fairchild Engine and Airplane Corporation developed the Chase XCG-20 glider into the C-123 Provider transport which entered service in 1955. In 1954 Fairchild purchased the American Helicopter Company, incorporating it and the XH-26 Jet Jeep as a division. In 1956, the company acquired rights to the Fokker Friendship, producing 206 of the aircraft as the Fairchild F-27 and Fairchild Hiller FH-227. During the 1950s, Fairchild was a large subcontractor to Boeing for B-52 fuselage sections and wing panels. Later, the company built McDonnell-Douglas F-4 Phantom II tail sections, Grumman F-14 Tomcat tails, and Space Shuttle orbiter stabilizers.

In 1964, the company purchased Hiller Aircraft, changing its name to Fairchild Hiller and producing the FH-1100, until 1973 when the helicopter division was sold back to Stanley Hiller. In 1965, the company acquired the Republic Aviation Company.

Following the death of its founder, Fairchild changed its name to Fairchild Industries in 1971. This was a merger of Fairchild-Hiller Corporation, division and subsidiaries: Fairchild Aircraft Marketing Company, Fairchild Aircraft Services Division, Fairchild Republic Division, Fairchild Space and Electronics Division, Fairchild Stratos Division, Burns Aero Seat Company, Inc., Fairchild Arms International, Ltd., Fairchild Aviation (Asia) Ltd., Fairchild Aviation (Holland) N.V., Fairchild-Germantown Development Company, Inc. and S.J. Industries, Inc. Before 1971, Fairchild Industries was a term used to include many of the companies of its founder Sherman Mills Fairchild.

After the name change, the company purchased Swearingen and manufactured the Fairchild Swearingen Metroliner, a successful commuter aircraft that gained orders from the U.S. military as the C-26 Metroliner. In 1971, the company began developing the Fairchild Republic A-10 Thunderbolt II in Germantown, Maryland, which prevailed over the rival Northrop YA-9 in the A-X competition for an eventual production run of 716 aircraft.

The company developed the T-46 jet trainer to replace the elderly Cessna T-37 Tweet trainer, but it was not accepted by the Air Force because of performance problems.

Their association with Boeing continued into the 1980s as they built wing control surfaces for 747s and 757s.

Aircraft production was ended in Hagerstown, Maryland in 1984.

After the company took over Dornier's civil assets in 1996, the company was renamed Fairchild Dornier. The company commenced production of the Dornier 328 in 1998 under license from Deutsche Aerospace AG (DASA).

In December 1999, Fairchild Aerospace Corporation was acquired by German insurer Allianz A.G. and the United States investment group Clayton, Dubilier & Rice Inc. for $1.2 billion.

Logo as of 2003

In 2003, the assets of Fairchild were purchased by M7 Aerospace and the new company was moved to San Antonio.

On December 15, 2010, M7 was purchased by the United States subsidiary of the Israeli defense contractor Elbit Systems. M7 Aerospace does not manufacture aircraft, but focuses on aerospace parts and support services.

== Products ==
=== Aircraft ===
| Model name | First flight | Number built | Type |
|---|---|---|---|
| Fairchild FC-1 | 1926 | 1 | Four passenger cabin monoplane |
| Fairchild FC-2 | 1926 | 118 | Four passenger cabin monoplane |
| Fairchild 71 | 1926 | 111 | Eight passenger cabin monoplane |
| Fairchild 42 | 1927 | 8 | Three passenger cabin monoplane |
| Fairchild 21 | 1927 | 2 | Two-seat biplane |
| Fairchild KR-34 | 1928 | >73 | Two-seat biplane |
| Fairchild 100 | 1930 | 27 | Nine passenger airliner |
| Fairchild 22 | 1931 | 127 | Two-seat parasol monoplane |
| Fairchild 24 | 1932 | 2,232 | Four passenger cabin monoplane |
| Fairchild 91 | 1935 | 7 | Flying-boat airliner |
| Fairchild Model 45 | 1935 | 17 | Cabin monoplane |
| Fairchild F-46 | 1937 | 1 | Cabin monoplane |
| Fairchild PT-19 | 1939 | 6,397 | Trainer |
| Fairchild AT-21 Gunner | 1943 | 175 | Trainer |
| Fairchild BQ-3 | 1944 | 2 | Assault Drone |
| Fairchild C-82 Packet | 1944 | 223 | Military transport |
| Fairchild M-84 | 1945 | 1 | Four-Five place family aircraft |
| Fairchild C-119 Flying Boxcar | 1947 | 1,183 | Military transport |
| Fairchild XNQ | 1949 | 2 | Trainer |
| Fairchild C-123 Provider | 1949 | 307 | Military transport |
| Fairchild XC-120 Packplane | 1950 | 1 | Military transport |
| Fairchild Hiller F-27, FH-227 | 1958 | 206 | Turboprop commuter airliner |
| Fairchild VZ-5 | 1959 | 1 | Experimental VTOL |
| Fairchild 228 | 1968 | 2 | Regional jet airliner |
| Fairchild-Swearingen Merlin | 1965 | | Turboprop corporate |
| Fairchild FH-227 | 1956 | 79 | Turboprop airliner |
| Fairchild-Hiller FH-1100 | 1966 | 253 | Turbine helicopter |
| Fairchild AC-119 | 1968 | 52 | Ground-attack conversion of C-119 |
| Fairchild Swearingen Metroliner/C-26 | 1968 | 600 | Turboprop airliner |
| Fairchild AU-23 Peacemaker | 1971 | 35 | Counter-insurgency aircraft |
| Fairchild Republic A-10 Thunderbolt II | 1972 | 716 | Close air support |
| Fairchild T-46 | 1985 | 3 | Trainer |
| Fairchild Dornier 328JET | 1991 | 110 | Commuter jet |
| Fairchild Dornier 428JET | — | 0 | Cancelled (2000) regional jet |
| Fairchild Dornier 728 family | — | 0 | Cancelled (2002) commuter jets |

=== Missiles ===
- AUM-N-2 Petrel
- SAM-N-2 Lark
- XSM-73 Goose
- SD-5 Osprey

=== Spacecraft ===
- International Cometary Explorer
- Pegasus
- ATS-6

== See also ==
- Fairchild Industries
- Fairchild Corporation
- Fairchild Semiconductor
- Fairchild Camera and Instrument
- Ranger/Fairchild Engines
- List of aircraft engines

== Sources ==
- Donald, David, ed. The Complete Encyclopedia of World Aircraft. New York: Barnes & Noble Books, 1997. ISBN 0-7607-0592-5.
