= Seaplane =

Aircraft with an undercarriage capable of operating from water surfaces

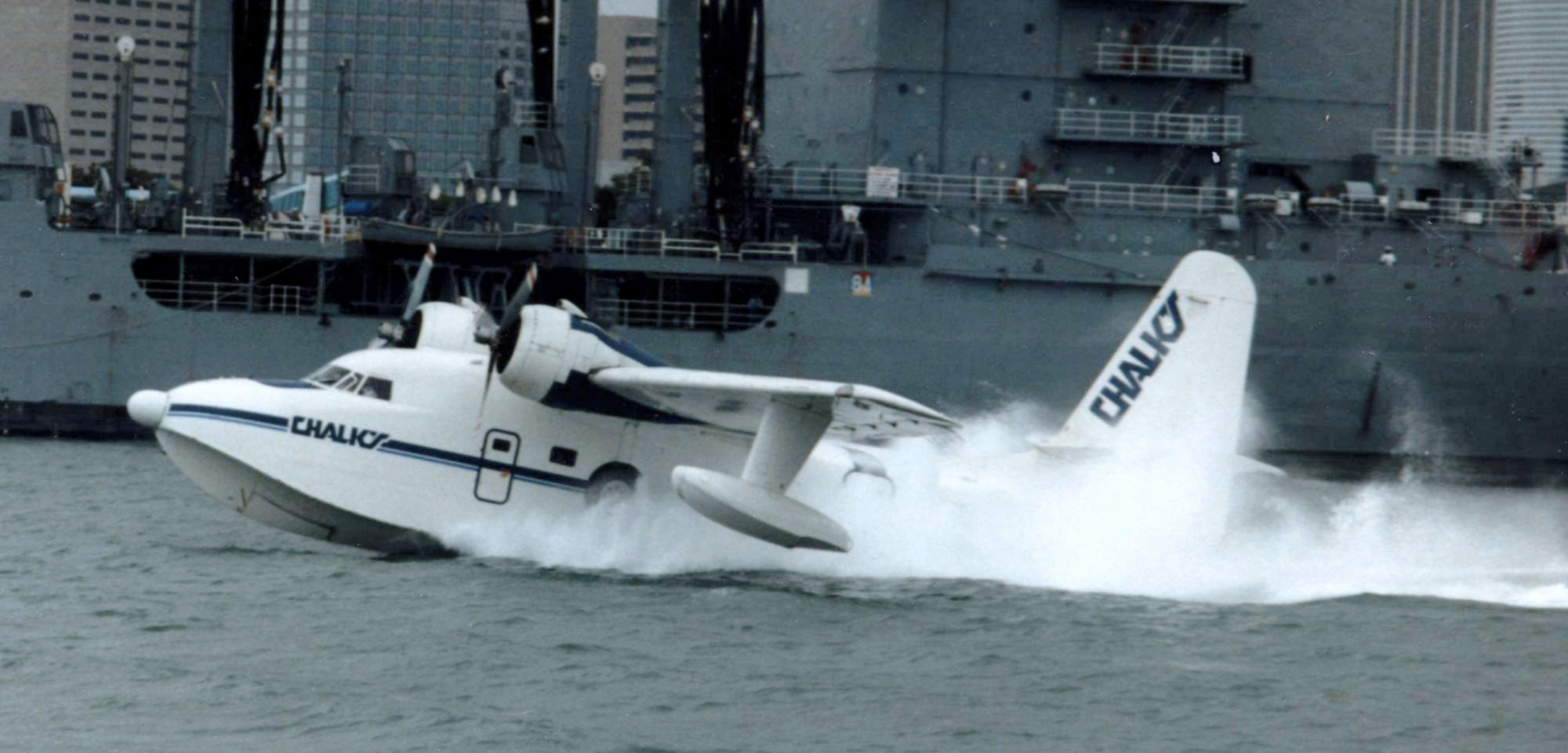
A Grumman G-111 Albatross amphibious flying boat landing

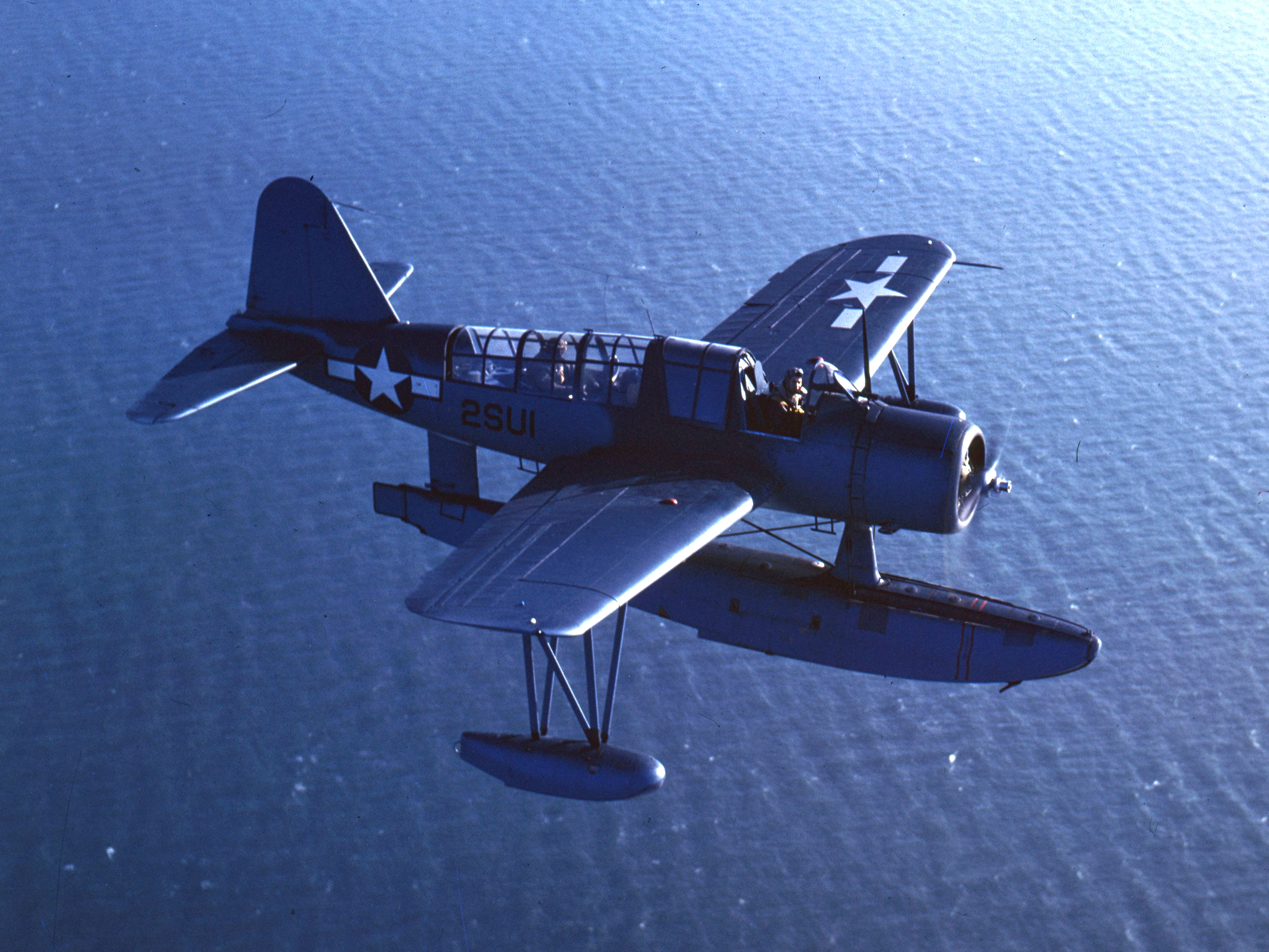
OS2U Kingfisher in 1944. Seaplanes were commonly used in World War II for reconnaissance and search and rescue. They were launched from ships or seaplane tenders, or could take off from water in the right conditions.

A seaplane is a powered fixed-wing aircraft capable of taking off and landing (alighting) on water. Seaplanes are usually divided into two categories based on their technological characteristics: floatplanes and flying boats; the latter are generally far larger and can carry far more. Seaplanes that can also take off and land on airfields are in a subclass called amphibious aircraft, or amphibians. Seaplanes were sometimes called hydroplanes, but currently this term applies instead to motor-powered watercraft that use the technique of hydrodynamic lift to skim the surface of water when running at speed.

The use of seaplanes gradually tapered off after World War II. This was in part due to investments in airports during the war, but mainly because landplanes were less constrained by weather conditions that affected seaplanes. In the 21st century, seaplanes maintain a few niche uses, such as for aerial firefighting, air transport around archipelagos, and access to undeveloped or roadless areas, some of which have numerous lakes. In the UK, seaplane is sometimes used specifically to refer to a floatplane, rather than a flying boat.

== Types ==
The word "seaplane" is used to describe two types of air/water vehicles: the floatplane and the flying boat.

The term "seaplane" is used by some to mean "floatplane". This is the standard British usage. This article treats both flying boats and floatplanes as types of seaplane, in the US fashion.

An amphibious aircraft can take off and land both on conventional runways and water. A true seaplane can only take off and land on water. There are amphibious flying boats and amphibious floatplanes, as well as some hybrid designs, e.g., floatplanes with retractable floats.

Modern (2019) production seaplanes range in size from flying-boat type light-sport aircraft amphibians, such as the Icon A5 and AirMax SeaMax, to the 100,000 lb ShinMaywa US-2 and Beriev Be-200 multi-role amphibians. Examples in between include the Dornier Seastar flying-boat type, 12-seat, utility amphibian and the Canadair CL-415 amphibious water-bomber. The Viking Air DHC-6 Twin Otter and Cessna Caravan utility aircraft have landing gear options which include amphibious floats.

=== Floatplane ===
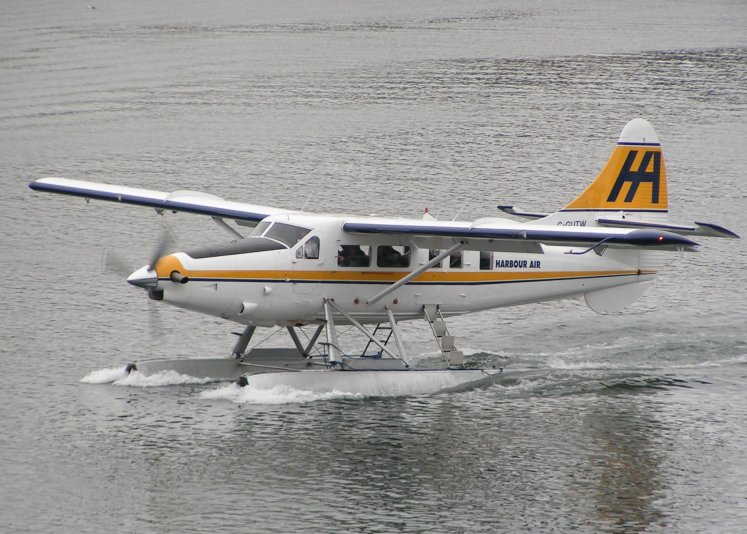
de Havilland Otter floatplane

A floatplane has slender floats, mounted under the fuselage. Two floats are common, but other configurations are possible. Only the floats of a floatplane normally come into contact with water. The fuselage remains above water. Some small land aircraft can be modified to become float planes, and in general, floatplanes are small aircraft. Floatplanes are limited by their inability to handle wave heights typically greater than 12 inches (0.31 m). The floats add to the empty weight of the airplane and to the drag coefficient, resulting in reduced payload capacity, slower rate of climb, and slower cruise speed. British usage is to call floatplanes "seaplanes" rather than use the term "seaplane" to refer to both floatplanes and flying boats.

==== Design ====
Floatplanes have often been derived from land-based aircraft, with fixed floats mounted under the fuselage instead of an undercarriage (featuring wheels). Floatplanes offer several advantages since the fuselage is not in contact with water, which simplifies production by not having to incorporate the compromises necessary for water tightness, general impact strength and the hydroplaning characteristics needed for the aircraft to leave the water. Attaching floats to a landplane also allows for much larger production volumes to pay for the development and production of the small number of aircraft operated from the water. Additionally, on all but the largest seaplanes, floatplane wings usually offer more clearance over obstacles, such as docks, reducing the difficulty in loading while on the water. A typical single engine flying boat is unable to bring the hull alongside a dock for loading while most floatplanes are able to do so.

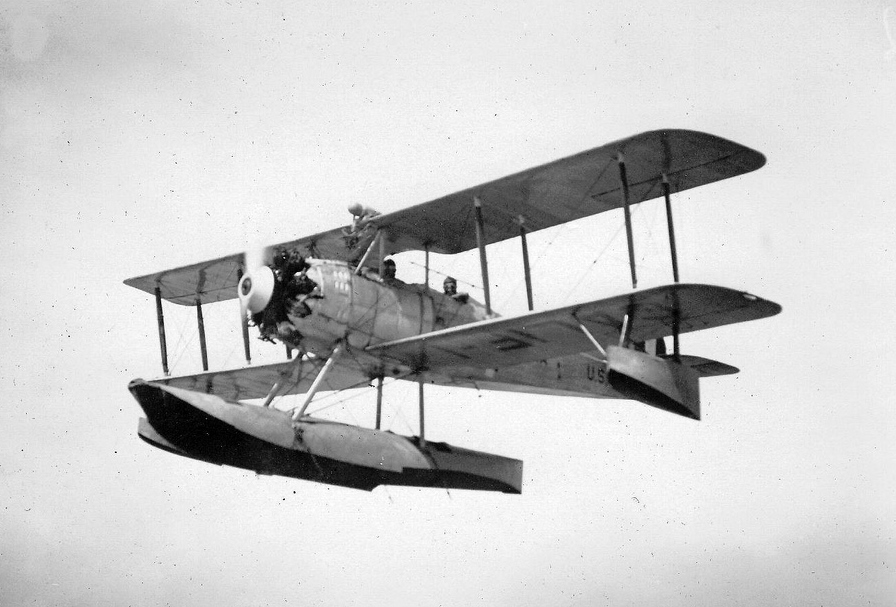
A Vought UO-1 floatplane of the U.S. Navy

Floats inevitably impose extra drag and weight, rendering floatplanes slower and less manoeuvrable during flight, with a slower rate of climb, than aircraft equipped with wheeled landing gear. Nevertheless, air races devoted to floatplanes attracted much attention during the 1920s and 1930s, most notably in the form of the Schneider Trophy, not least because water takeoffs permitted longer takeoff runs which allowed greater optimization for high speed compared to contemporary airfields.

There are two basic configurations for the floats on floatplanes:

- "single float" designs, in which a single large float is mounted directly underneath the fuselage, with smaller stabilizing floats underneath the wingtips, on planes like the Nakajima A6M2-N
- "twin float" designs, with two main floats mounted side by side outboard of the fuselage. Some early twin float designs had additional wingtip stabilizing floats.

The main advantage of the single float design is its capability for landings in rough water: a long central float is directly attached to the fuselage, this being the strongest part of the aircraft structure, while the smaller floats under the outer wings provide the aircraft with lateral stability. By comparison, dual floats restrict handling, often to waves as little as one foot (0.3 metres) in height. However, twin float designs facilitate mooring and boarding, and – in the case of torpedo bombers – leave the belly free to carry a torpedo.

=== Flying boat ===
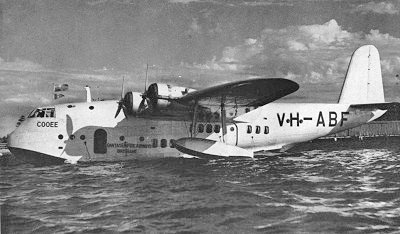
Short S23 "C" Class or "Empire" flying boat

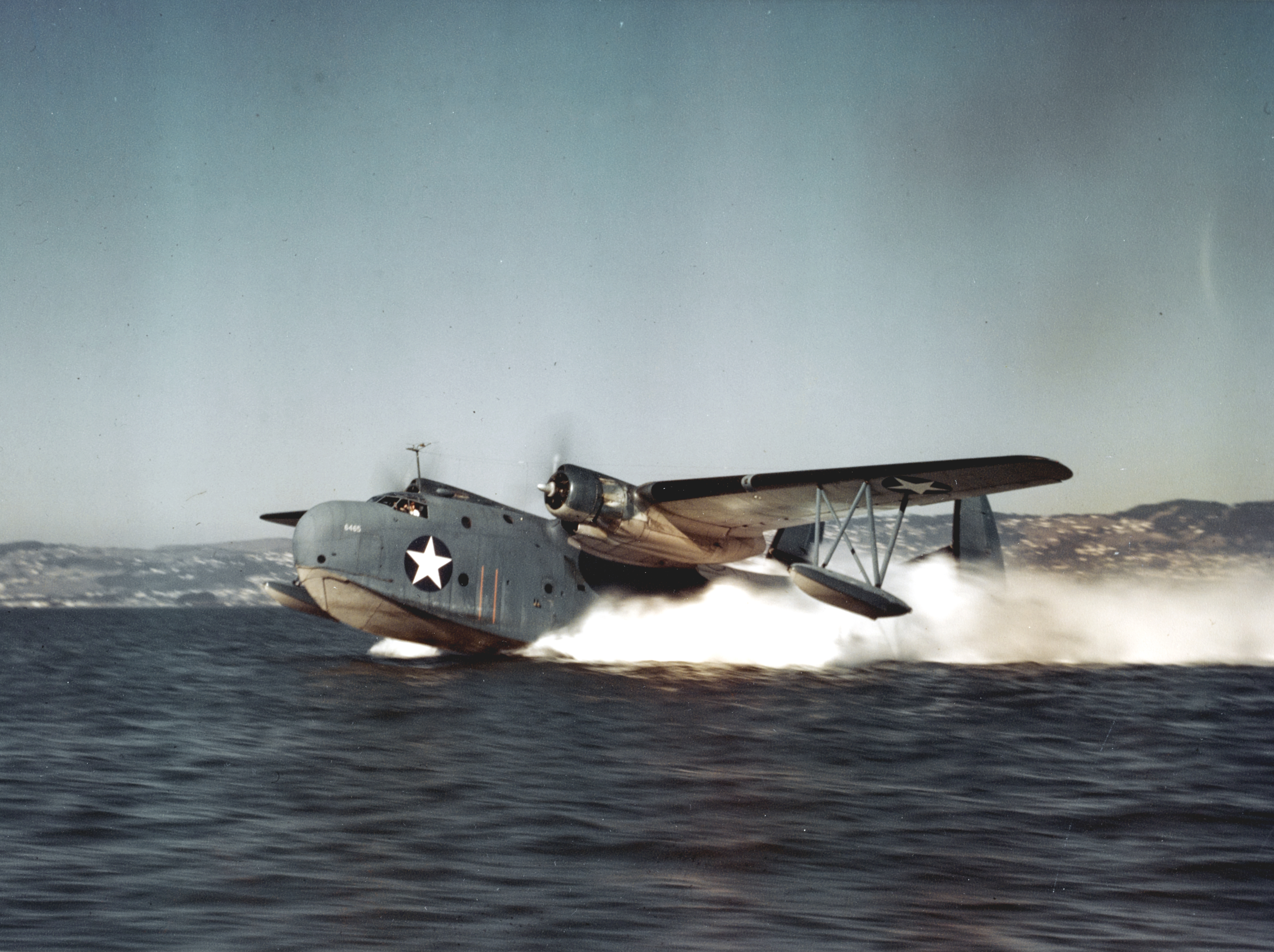
A PBM Mariner takes off in 1942

A flying boat is a type of seaplane with a hull, allowing it to land on water. It differs from a floatplane in having a fuselage that is purpose-designed for flotation, while floatplanes rely on fuselage-mounted floats for buoyancy. Though a flying boat's fuselage provides buoyancy, it may also utilize under-wing floats or wing-like hull projections (called sponsons) for additional stability.

Ascending into common use during the First World War, flying boats rapidly grew in both scale and capability throughout the interwar period, during which time numerous operators found commercial success with the type. Flying boats were some of the largest aircraft of the first half of the 20th century, exceeded in size only by bombers developed during the Second World War. Their advantage lay in using water instead of expensive land-based runways, making them the basis for international airlines in the interwar period. They were also commonly used as maritime patrol aircraft and air-sea rescue, particularly during times of conflict. Flying boats, such as the PBY Catalina and Short Sunderland, played key roles in both the Atlantic and Pacific Theater of the Second World War.

The popularity of flying boats gradually tailed off during the Cold War era, partially because of the difficulty in maintaining operations in inclement weather, when sea conditions may easily prevent takeoffs and landings while land-based aircraft are unaffected, in addition to investments in airports during the conflict that eased the introduction of land-based airliners that were larger and more efficient. Despite being broadly overshadowed, limited use of flying boats continued with some operators, such as in the cases of the Shin Meiwa US-1A and Martin JRM Mars. In the 21st century, flying boats maintain a few niche uses, such as dropping water on forest fires, air transport around archipelagos, and access to undeveloped areas. Many modern seaplane variants, whether float or flying boat types, are convertible amphibious aircraft, where either landing gear or flotation modes may be used to land and take off.

== History ==
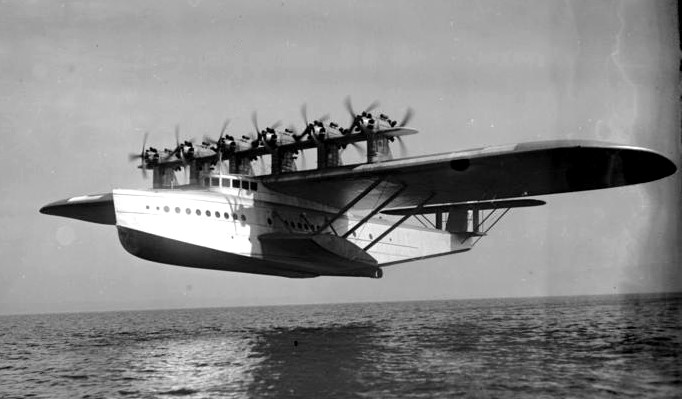
Dornier Do X, a flying boat airliner of the interwar period

Aviation's earliest pioneers looked to bodies of water to serve as runways for take-offs and landings, a practice that began in earnest in the 1910s. Seaplanes pioneered transatlantic air routes, and were used in World War I. They continued to develop before World War II, and saw widespread use. After World War II, the proliferation of land airstrips made water landings more applicable in special circumstances. The practice continued via niche applications, like accessing otherwise remote areas, fighting forest fires, and serving as maritime patrol vessels.

=== Early pioneers ===
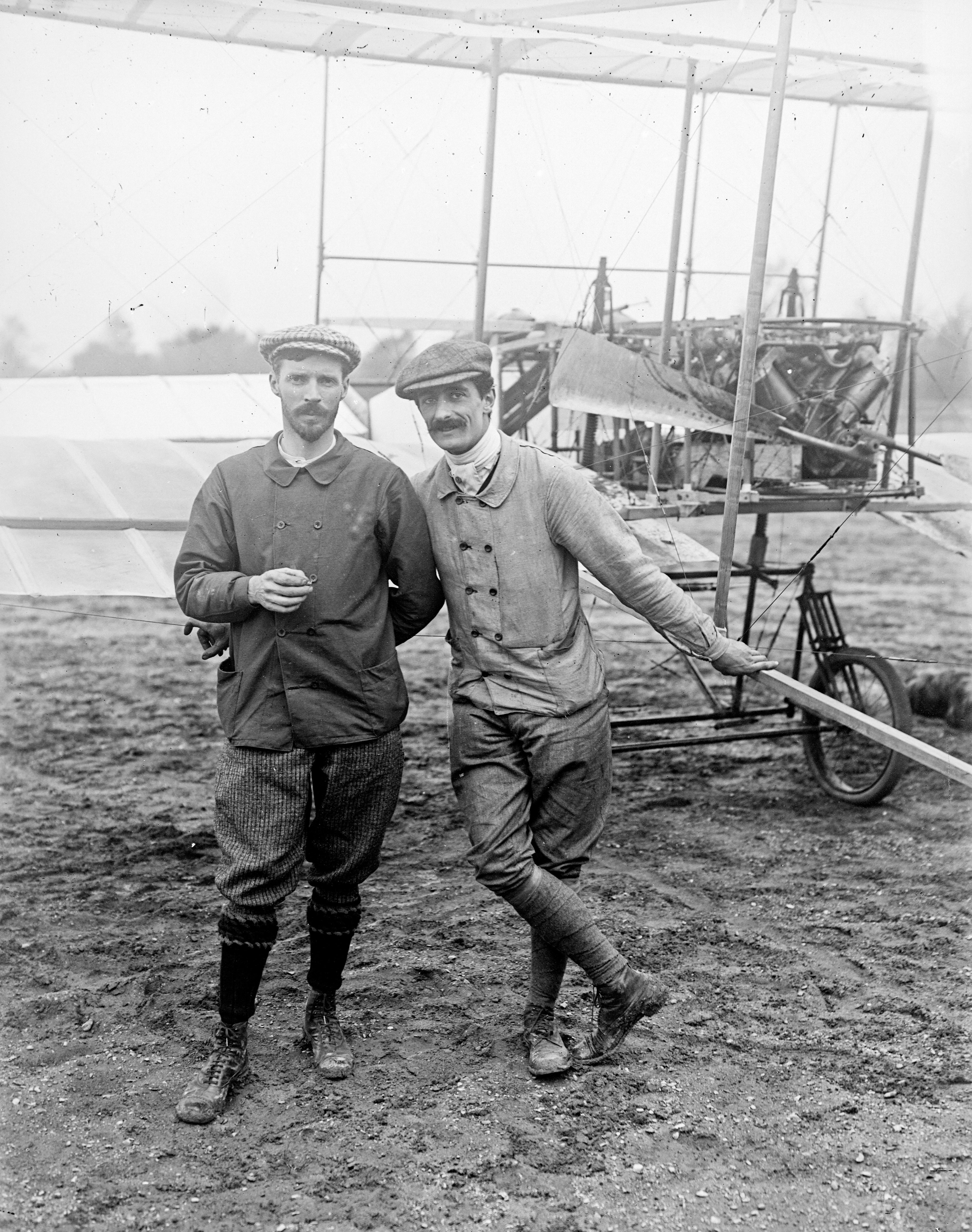
Gabriel Voisin, air pioneer, next to Henry Farman (left), in 1908.

The quest for an aircraft that could take off or land from water began with float planes, which are not flying boats.

In 1876, Frenchman Alphonse Pénaud filed the first patent for a flying machine with a boat hull and retractable landing gear, but failed to build one. Austrian Wilhelm Kress is credited by some with attempting to build the first successful seaplane Drachenflieger, a floatplane, in 1898, although its two 30 hp Daimler engines were inadequate for take-off, and it later sank when one of its two floats collapsed.

On 6 June 1905, Gabriel Voisin took off and landed on the River Seine with a towed kite glider on floats. The first of his unpowered flights was 150 yards (140 m). He later built a powered floatplane in partnership with Louis Blériot, but the machine was unsuccessful. Other pioneers also attempted to attach floats to aircraft in Britain, Australia, France, and the US.

On 28 March 1910, Frenchman Henri Fabre flew the first successful powered seaplane, the Gnome Omega-powered hydravion, a trimaran floatplane. Fabre's first successful take off and landing by a powered seaplane inspired other aviators, and he designed floats for several other flyers. The first hydro-aeroplane competition was held in Monaco in March 1912, featuring aircraft using floats from Fabre, Curtiss, Tellier and Farman. This led to the first scheduled seaplane passenger services, at Aix-les-Bains, using a five-seat Sanchez-Besa from 1 August 1912. The French Navy ordered its first floatplane in 1912. On May 10, 1912 Glenn L. Martin flew a homemade seaplane in California, setting records for distance and time.

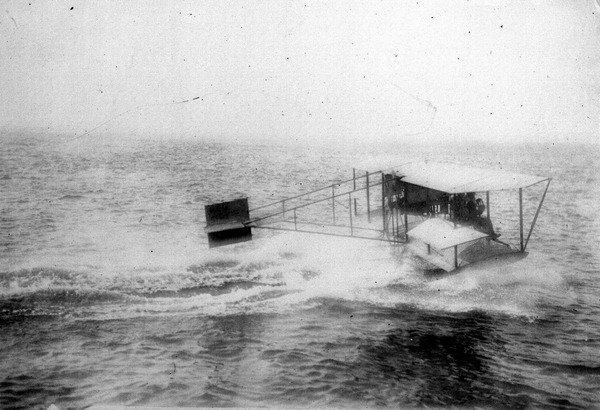
Curtiss A-1 seaplane in 1911

In 1911−12, François Denhaut constructed the first seaplane with a fuselage forming a hull, using various designs to give hydrodynamic lift at take-off. Its first successful flight was on 13 April 1912. Throughout 1910 and 1911, American pioneering aviator Glenn Curtiss developed his floatplane into the successful Curtiss Model D land-plane, which used a larger central float and sponsons. Combining floats with wheels, he made the first amphibian flights in February 1911 and was awarded the first Collier Trophy for US flight achievement. From 1912, his experiments with a hulled seaplane resulted in the 1913 Model E and Model F, which he called "flying-boats". In February 1911, the United States Navy took delivery of the Curtiss Model E and soon tested landings on and take-offs from ships, using the Curtiss Model D.

There were experiments by aviators to adapt the Wright Model B to a water landing. The first motion picture recorded from an airplane was from a Wright Model B floatplane, by Frank Coffyn in 1911. The Wright Brothers, widely celebrated for their breakthrough aircraft designs, were slower to develop a seaplane; Wilbur died in 1912, and the company was bogged down in lawsuits. However, by 1913, the Wright Brother company developed the Wright Model CH Flyer. In 1913, the Wright company also came out with the Wright Model G Aerboat, which was a seaplane with an enclosed cabin (a first for the company);the chief engineer of this version was Grover Loening.

In Britain, Captain Edward Wakefield and Oscar Gnosspelius began to explore the feasibility of flight from water in 1908. They decided to make use of Windermere in the Lake District, England's largest lake. In 1909, the duo attended the Blackpool Aviation Week, where Wakefield "put forward the theory of flying from water, but was ridiculed by the experts." The rejection spurred the two men into collaborating on their own individual hydro aeroplane designs. To test their floatplanes, they decided to make use of Windermere in the Lake District—England's largest lake. Gnosspelius' first attempts to fly attracted large crowds, although the aircraft, named Gnosspelius No.1, failed to take off due to its underpowered engines. The unsuccessful demonstration prompted Gnosspelius to re-design the floats that had been crafted for him by boat builders Borwick & Sons, and had incorporated features of Borwick's successful speed-boat hulls. Meanwhile, Wakefield ordered a floatplane similar to the design of the 1910 Fabre Hydravion. By November 1911, both Gnosspelius and Wakefield had aircraft capable of flight from water and awaited suitable weather conditions. Gnosspelius's flight was short-lived, as the aircraft crashed into the lake. Conversely, Wakefield's pilot took advantage of a light northerly wind, and successfully took off and flew at a height of 50 feet to Ferry Nab, where he made a wide turn and returned for a perfect landing on the lake's surface.

In Switzerland, Émile Taddéoli equipped the Dufaux 4 biplane with swimmers and successfully took off in 1912. A seaplane was used during the Balkan Wars in 1913, when a Greek "Astra Hydravion" did a reconnaissance of the Turkish fleet and dropped four bombs.

=== Birth of an industry ===
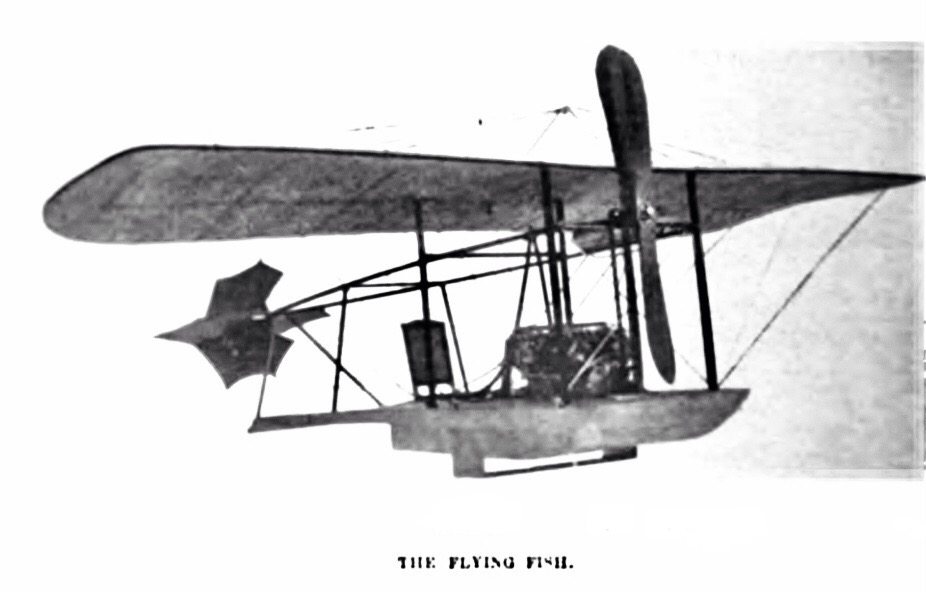
The flying fish (1911)

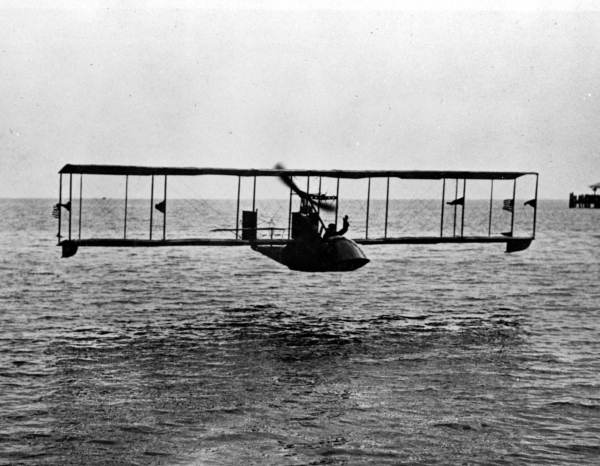
Benoist XIV, 1914

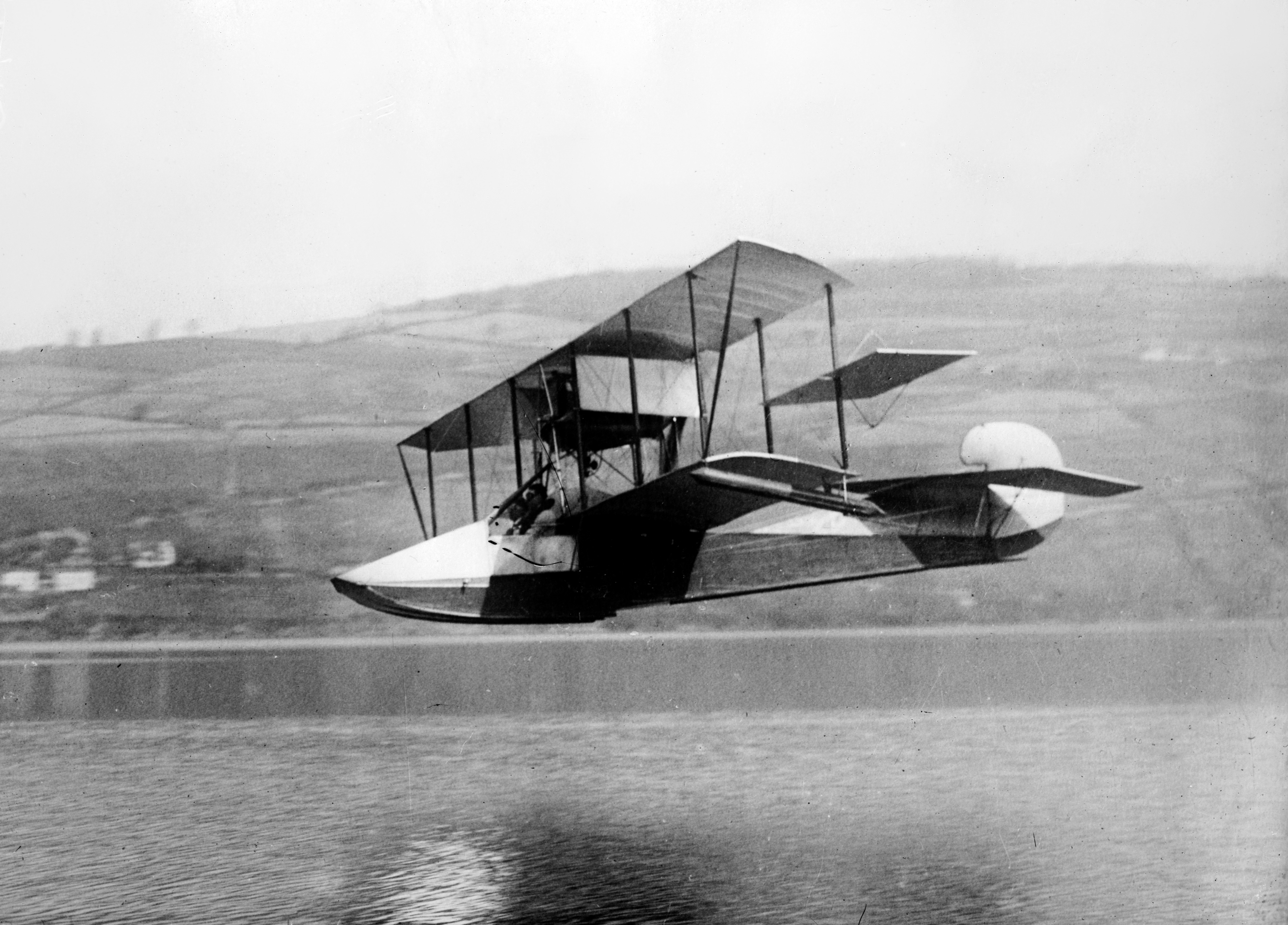
Curtiss Model F

In 1913, the Daily Mail newspaper put up a £10,000 prize for the first non-stop aerial crossing of the Atlantic, which was soon "enhanced by a further sum" from the Women's Aerial League of Great Britain.

American businessman Rodman Wanamaker became determined that the prize should go to an American aircraft and commissioned the Curtiss Aeroplane and Motor Company to design and build an aircraft capable of making the flight. Curtiss's development of the Flying Fish flying boat in 1913 brought him into contact with John Cyril Porte, a retired Royal Navy Lieutenant, aircraft designer and test pilot who was to become an influential British aviation pioneer. Recognising that many of the early accidents were attributable to a poor understanding of handling while in contact with the water, the pair's efforts went into developing practical hull designs to make the transatlantic crossing possible.

The two years before World War I's breakout also saw the privately produced pair of Benoist XIV biplane flying boats, designed by Thomas W. Benoist, initiate the start of the first heavier-than-air airline service anywhere in the world, and the first airline service of any kind at all in the United States.

At the same time, the British boat-building firm J. Samuel White of Cowes on the Isle of Wight set up a new aircraft division and produced a flying boat in the United Kingdom. This was displayed at the London Air Show at Olympia in 1913. In that same year, a collaboration between the S. E. Saunders boatyard of East Cowes and the Sopwith Aviation Company produced the "Bat Boat", an aircraft with a consuta laminated hull that could operate from land or on water, which today is called an amphibious aircraft. The "Bat Boat" completed several landings on sea and on land and was duly awarded the Mortimer Singer Prize. It was the first all-British aeroplane capable of making six return flights over five miles within five hours.

In the US, Wanamaker's commission built on Glen Curtiss's previous development and experience with the Curtiss Model F for the U.S. Navy, which rapidly resulted in the America, designed under Porte's supervision following his study and rearrangement of the flight plan; the aircraft was a conventional biplane design with two-bay, unstaggered wings of unequal span with two pusher inline engines mounted side-by-side above the fuselage in the interplane gap. Wingtip pontoons were attached directly below the lower wings near their tips. The design (later developed into the Model H) resembled Curtiss's earlier flying boats but was built considerably larger so it could carry enough fuel to cover 1,100 mi (1,800 km). The three crew members were accommodated in a fully enclosed cabin.

Trials of the America began 23 June 1914 with Porte also as Chief Test Pilot; testing soon revealed serious shortcomings in the design; it was under-powered, so the engines were replaced with more powerful tractor engines. There was also a tendency for the nose of the aircraft to try to submerge as engine power increased while taxiing on water. This phenomenon had not been encountered before, since Curtiss's earlier designs had not used such powerful engines nor large fuel/cargo loads and so were relatively more buoyant. In order to counteract this effect, Curtiss fitted fins to the sides of the bow to add hydrodynamic lift, but soon replaced these with sponsons, a type of underwater pontoon mounted in pairs on either side of a hull. These sponsons (or their engineering equivalents) and the flared, notched hull would remain a prominent feature of flying-boat hull design in the decades to follow. With the problem resolved, preparations for the crossing resumed. While the craft was found to handle "heavily" on takeoff, and required rather longer take-off distances than expected, the full moon on 5 August 1914 was selected for the trans-Atlantic flight; Porte was to pilot the America with George Hallett as co-pilot and mechanic.

=== World War I (1914–1918) ===
Curtiss and Porte's plans were interrupted by the outbreak of World War I. Porte sailed for England on 4 August 1914 and rejoined the Navy as a member of the Royal Naval Air Service. Appointed Squadron Commander of Royal Navy Air Station Hendon, he soon convinced the Admiralty of the potential of flying boats and was put in charge of the naval air station at Felixstowe in 1915. Porte persuaded the Admiralty to commandeer (and later, purchase) the America and a sister craft from Curtiss. This was followed by an order for 12 more similar aircraft, one Model H-2 and the remaining as Model H-4s. Four examples of the latter were assembled in the UK by Saunders. All of these were similar to the design of the America and, indeed, were all referred to as Americas in Royal Navy service. The engines, however, were changed from the under-powered 160 hp Curtiss engines to 250 hp Rolls-Royce Falcon engines. The initial batch was followed by an order for 50 more (totalling 64 Americas overall during the war). Porte also acquired permission to modify and experiment with the Curtiss aircraft.

The Curtiss H-4s were soon found to have a number of problems; they were underpowered, their hulls were too weak for sustained operations, and they had poor handling characteristics when afloat or taking off. One flying boat pilot, Major Theodore Douglas Hallam, wrote that they were "comic machines, weighing well under two tons; with two comic engines giving, when they functioned, 180 horsepower; and comic control, being nose heavy with engines on and tail heavy in a glide."

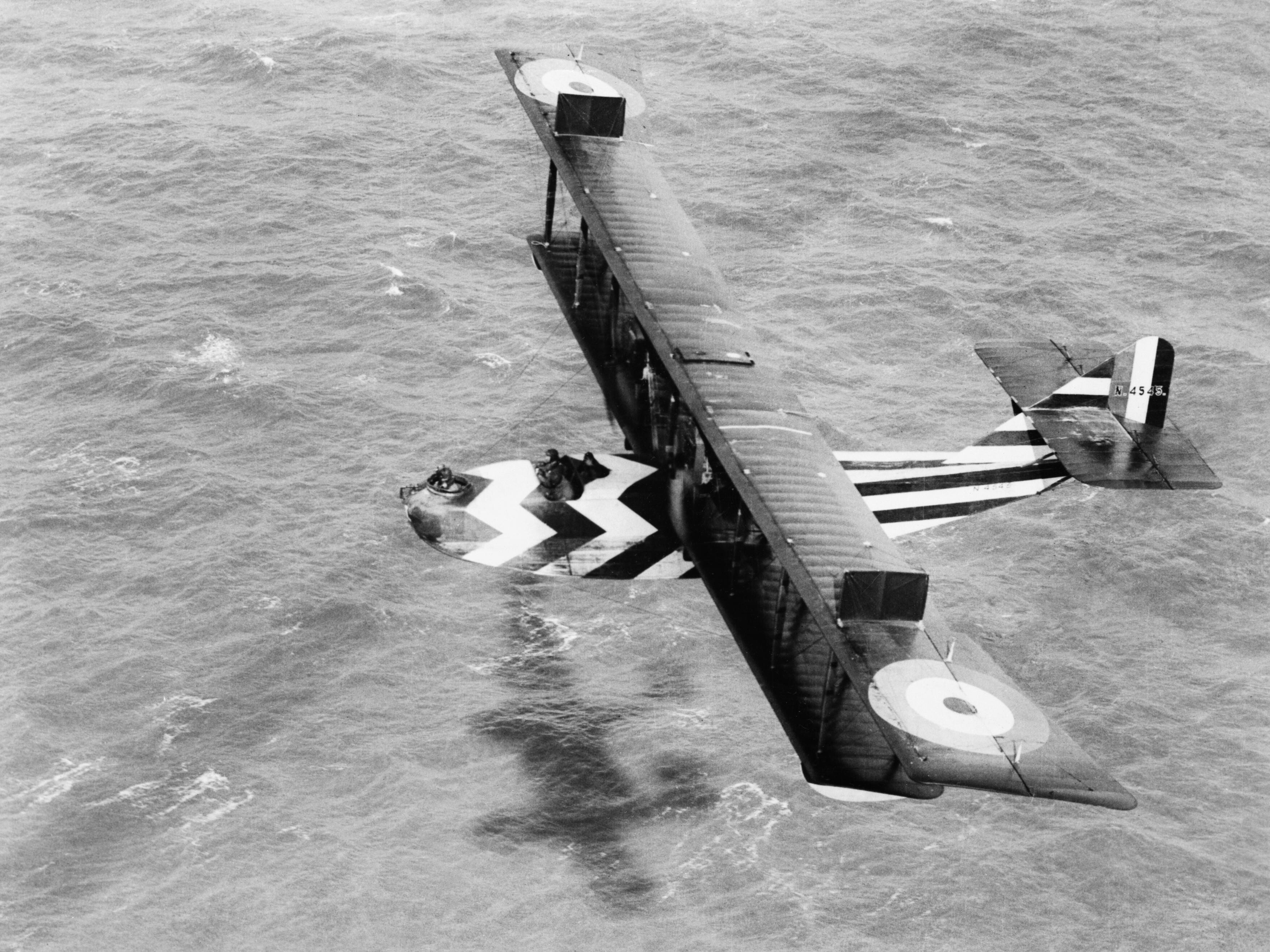
The Felixstowe F.2A, a WW1 flying boat

At Felixstowe, Porte made advances in flying-boat design and developed a practical hull design with the distinctive "Felixstowe notch". Porte's first design to be implemented in Felixstowe was the Felixstowe Porte Baby, a large, three-engined biplane flying boat, powered by one central pusher and two outboard tractor Rolls-Royce Eagle engines.

Porte modified an H-4 with a new hull whose improved hydrodynamic qualities made taxiing, take-off and landing much more practical and called it the Felixstowe F.1.

Porte's innovation of the "Felixstowe notch" enabled the craft to overcome suction from the water more quickly and break free for flight much more easily. This made operating the craft far safer and more reliable. The "notch" breakthrough would soon after evolve into a "step", with the rear section of the lower hull sharply recessed above the forward lower hull section, and that characteristic became a feature of both flying-boat hulls and seaplane floats. The resulting aircraft would be large enough to carry sufficient fuel to fly long distances and could berth alongside ships to take on more fuel.

Porte then designed a similar hull for the larger Curtiss H-12 flying boat which, while larger and more capable than the H-4s, shared failings of a weak hull and poor water handling. The combination of the new Porte-designed hull, this time fitted with two steps, with the wings of the H-12 and a new tail, and powered by two Rolls-Royce Eagle engines, was named the Felixstowe F.2 and first flew in July 1916, proving greatly superior to the Curtiss on which it was based. It was used as the basis for all future designs. It entered production as the Felixstowe F.2A, being used as a patrol aircraft, with about 100 being completed by the end of World War I. Another seventy were built, and these were followed by two F.2c, which were built at Felixstowe.

In February 1917, the first prototype of the Felixstowe F.3 was flown. It was larger and heavier than the F.2, giving it greater range and heavier bomb load, but poorer agility. Approximately 100 Felixstowe F.3s were produced before the end of the war.

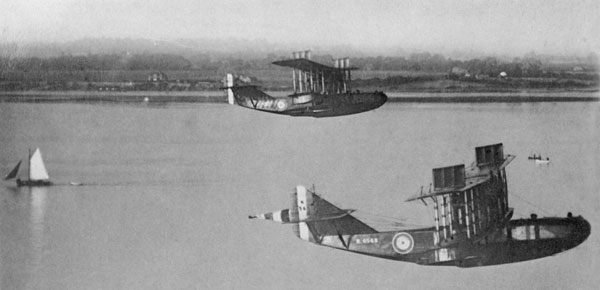
The Felixstowe F.5, designed by Lieutenant Commander John Cyril Porte at the Seaplane Experimental Station, Felixstowe

The Felixstowe F.5 was intended to combine the good qualities of the F.2 and F.3, with the prototype first flying in May 1918. The prototype showed superior qualities to its predecessors but, to ease production, the production version was modified to make extensive use of components from the F.3, which resulted in lower performance than the F.2A or F.5.

Porte's final design at the Seaplane Experimental Station was the 123-foot-span five-engined Felixstowe Fury triplane (also known as the "Porte Super-Baby" or "PSB").

F.2, F.3, and F.5 flying boats were extensively employed by the Royal Navy for coastal patrols and to search for German U-boats. In 1918, they were towed on lighters towards the northern German ports to extend their range; on 4 June 1918, this resulted in three F.2As engaging in a dogfight with ten German seaplanes, shooting down two confirmed and four probables at no loss. As a result of this action, British flying boats were dazzle-painted to aid identification in combat.

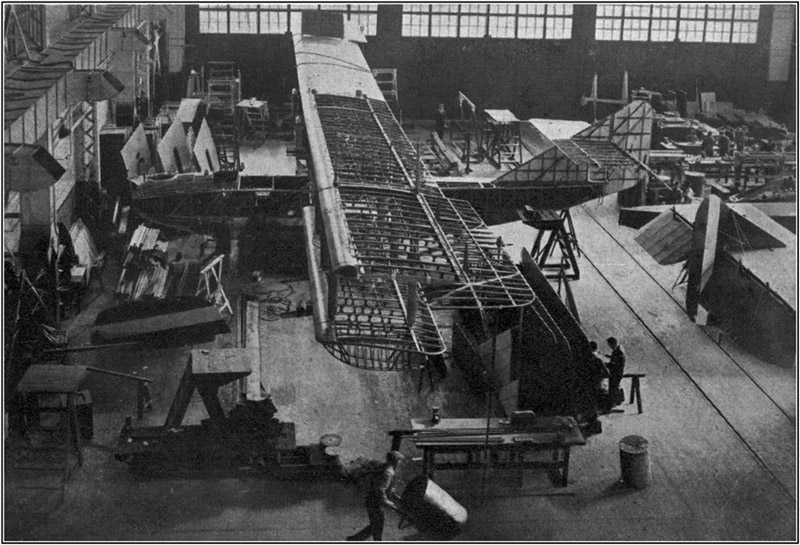
Felixstowe F5L under construction at the Naval Aircraft Factory, Philadelphia, circa 1920

The Curtiss Aeroplane and Motor Company independently developed its designs into the small Model F, the larger Model K (several of which were sold to the Russian Naval Air Service), and the Model C for the U.S. Navy. Curtiss, among others, also built the Felixstowe F.5 as the Curtiss F5L, based on the final Porte hull designs and powered by American Liberty engines.

Meanwhile, the pioneering flying-boat designs of François Denhaut had been steadily developed by the Franco-British Aviation Company into a range of practical craft. Smaller than the Felixstowes, several thousand FBAs served with almost all of the Allied forces as reconnaissance craft, patrolling the North Sea, Atlantic and Mediterranean Oceans.

In Italy, several seaplanes were developed, starting with the L series and progressing with the M series. The Macchi M.5, in particular, was extremely manoeuvrable and agile and matched the land-based aircraft it had to fight. Two hundred forty-four were built in total. Towards the end of World War I, the aircraft were flown by Italian Navy Aviation, United States Navy and United States Marine Corps airmen. Ensign Charles Hammann won the first Medal of Honor awarded to a United States naval aviator in an M.5

The German aircraft manufacturing company Hansa-Brandenburg built flying boats starting with the model Hansa-Brandenburg GW in 1916, and had a degree of military success with their Hansa-Brandenburg W.12 two-seat floatplane fighter the following year, being the primary aircraft flown by Imperial Germany's maritime fighter ace, Friedrich Christiansen. The Austro-Hungarian firm Lohner-Werke began building flying boats, starting with the Lohner E in 1914 and the later (1915) widely copied Lohner L.

=== Between the wars ===
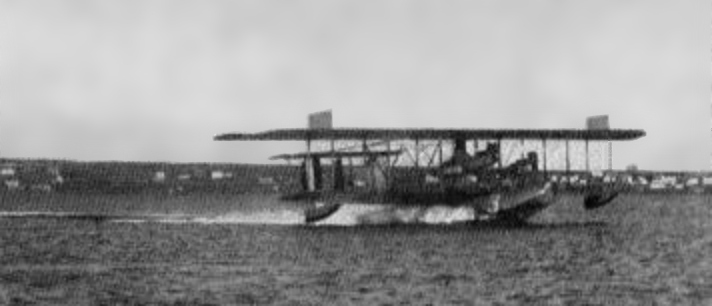
Curtiss NC Flying Boat "NC-3" skims across the water before takeoff, 1919

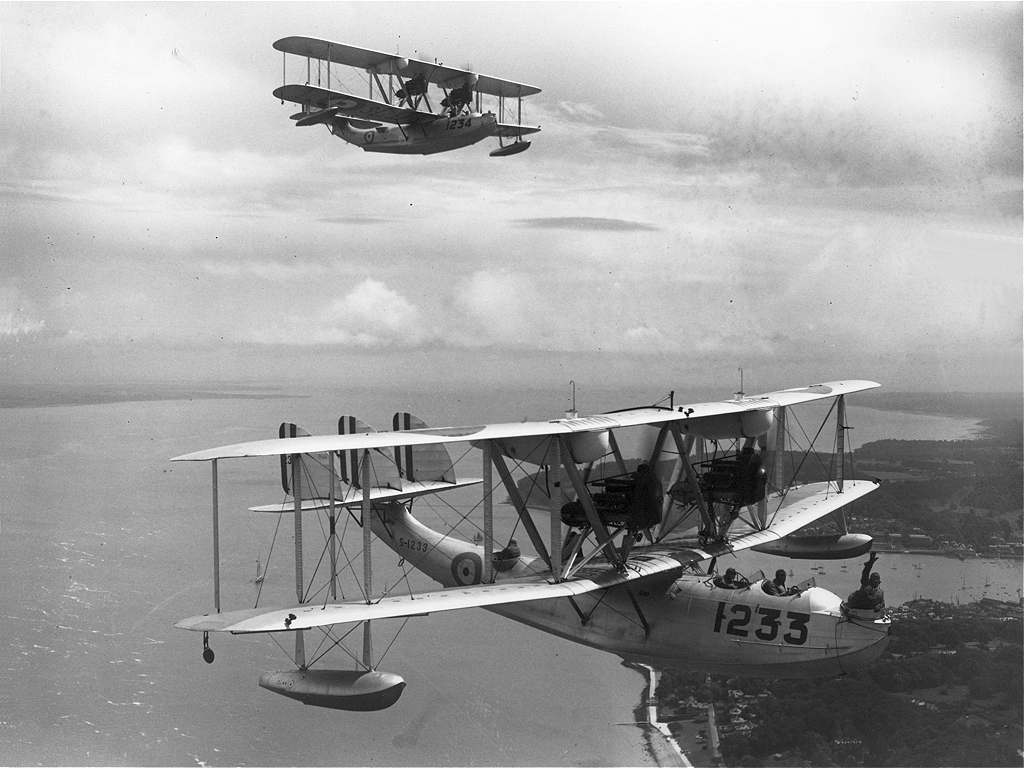
Supermarine Southamptons, 1925

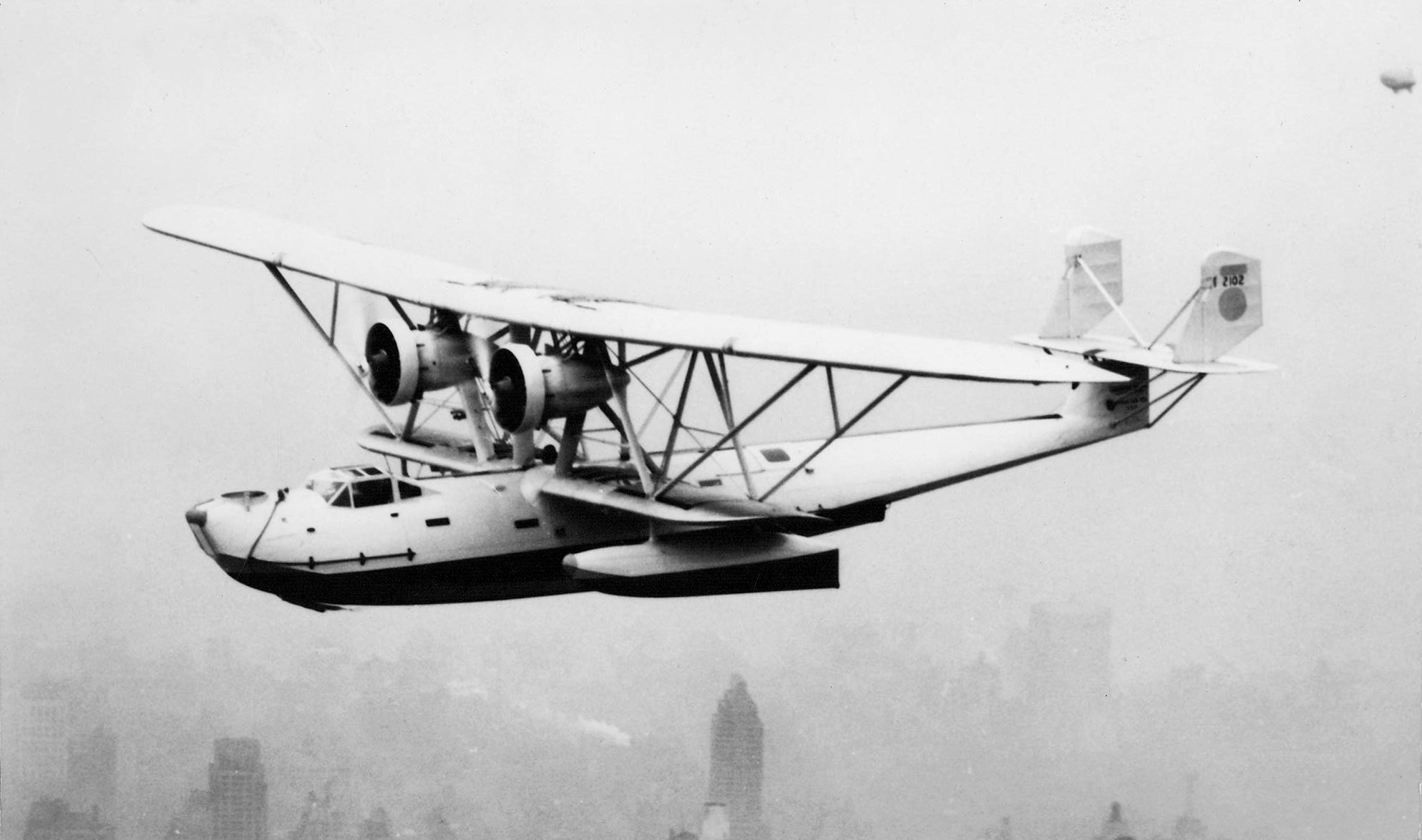
Consolidated flying boat produced for Japan, which evaluated the type in the 1930s

In September 1919, British company Supermarine started operating the first flying-boat service in the world, from Woolston to Le Havre in France, but it was short-lived.

A Curtiss NC-4 became the first aircraft to fly across the Atlantic Ocean in 1919, crossing via the Azores. Of the four that made the attempt, only one completed the flight. Before the development of highly reliable aircraft, the ability to land on water was a desirable safety feature for transoceanic travel.

During the 1920s, the Royal Air Force (RAF) Far East flight performed a series of "showing the flag" long-distance formation flights using the newly developed Supermarine Southampton. Perhaps the most notable of these flights was a 43,500 km (27,000 mi) expedition conducted during 1927 and 1928; it was carried out by four Southamptons of the Far East Flight, setting out from Felixstowe via the Mediterranean and India to Singapore. Both the RAF and Supermarine acquired considerable acclaim from these flights, as well as proving that flying boats had evolved to become reliable means of long-distance transport.

In 1923, the first successful commercial flying boat service was introduced with flights to and from the Channel Islands. The British aviation industry was experiencing rapid growth. The Government decided that nationalization was necessary and ordered five aviation companies to merge to form the state-owned Imperial Airways of London (IAL). IAL became the international flag-carrying British airline, providing flying boat passenger and mail transport links between Britain and South Africa using aircraft such as the Short S.8 Calcutta.

In 1928, four Supermarine Southampton flying boats of the RAF Far East flight arrived in Melbourne, Australia. The flight was considered proof that flying boats had become a reliable means of long-distance transport.

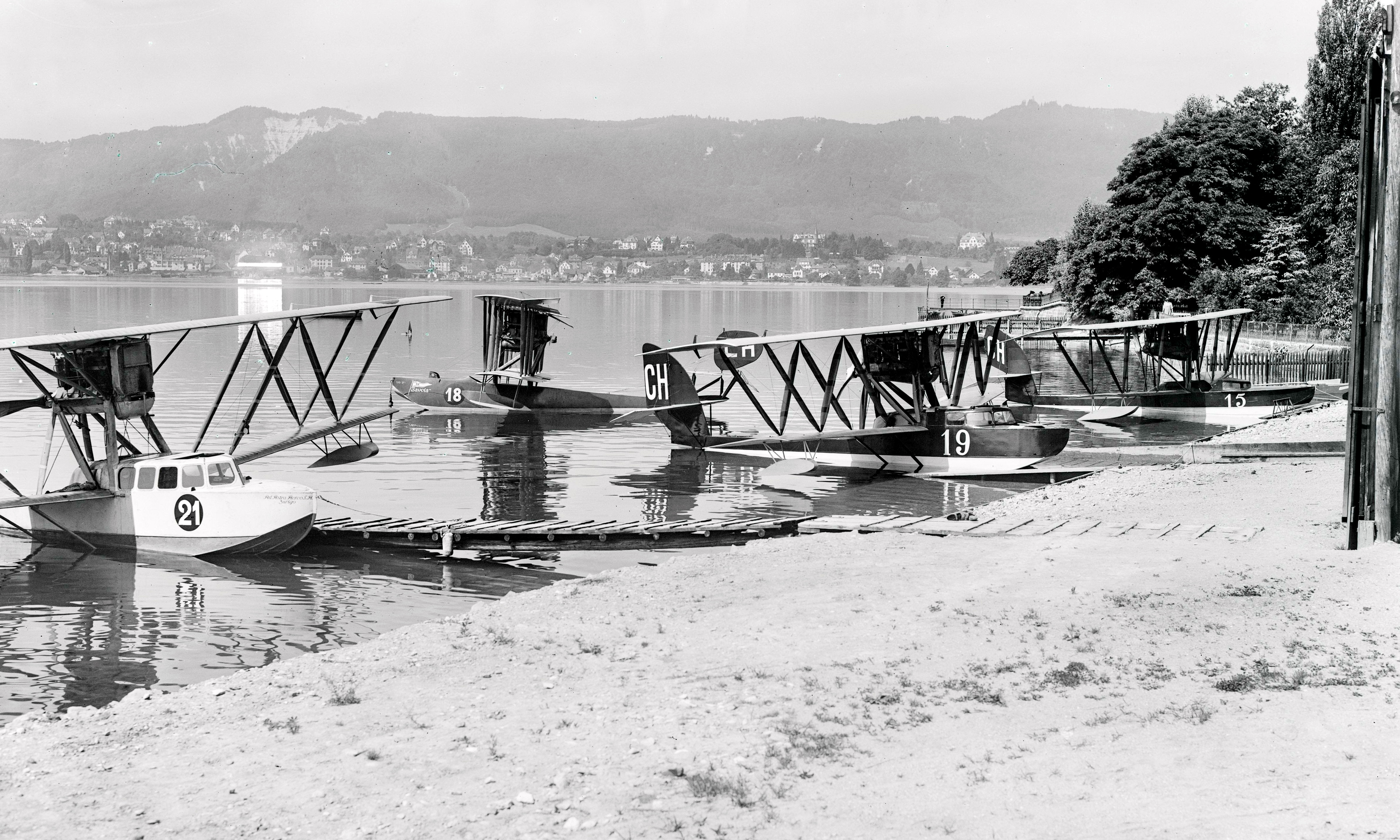
Flying boats of Ad Astra Aero S.A. at Zürichhorn water airport, Uetliberg in the background (c. 1920)

In the 1930s, flying boats made it possible to have regular air transport between the U.S. and Europe, opening up new air travel routes to South America, Africa, and Asia. Foynes, Ireland and Botwood, Newfoundland and Labrador were the terminals for many early transatlantic flights. In areas where there were no airfields for land-based aircraft, flying boats could stop at small river, lake or coastal stations to refuel and resupply. The Pan Am Boeing 314 "Clipper" flying boats brought new exotic destinations like the Far East within reach and came to represent the romance of flight.

By 1931, mail from Australia was reaching Britain in just 16 days – less than half the time taken by sea. In that year, government tenders on both sides of the world invited applications to run new passenger and mail services between the ends of the British Empire, and Qantas and IAL were successful with a joint bid. A company under combined ownership was then formed, Qantas Empire Airways. The new ten-day service between Rose Bay, New South Wales (near Sydney), and Southampton was such a success with letter-writers that before long the volume of mail was exceeding aircraft storage space.

A better solution to the problem was sought by the British government during the early 1930s, who released a specification calling for a new large aircraft capable of carrying up to 24 passengers in spacious comfort along with adequate room for airmail or freight while simultaneously being capable of a cruising speed of 170 mph and a range of at least 700 miles; the capacity for an extended range of 2,000 miles to serve the North Atlantic route was also stipulated. Originally intended for use by IAL, partner Qantas agreed to the initiative and undertook to purchase six of the new Short S23 "C" class or "Empire" flying boats as well. Being ordered from aviation manufacturer Short Brothers, the Empire was reportedly hailed as being "one of the world's boldest experiments in aviation", while early sceptics referred to the order less favourably as being a 'gamble'. IAL were so impressed by the Empire that it placed a follow-on order for another 11; when combined with the original order for 28 flying boats, this was the largest single order to have ever been placed for a British civil aircraft at that time.

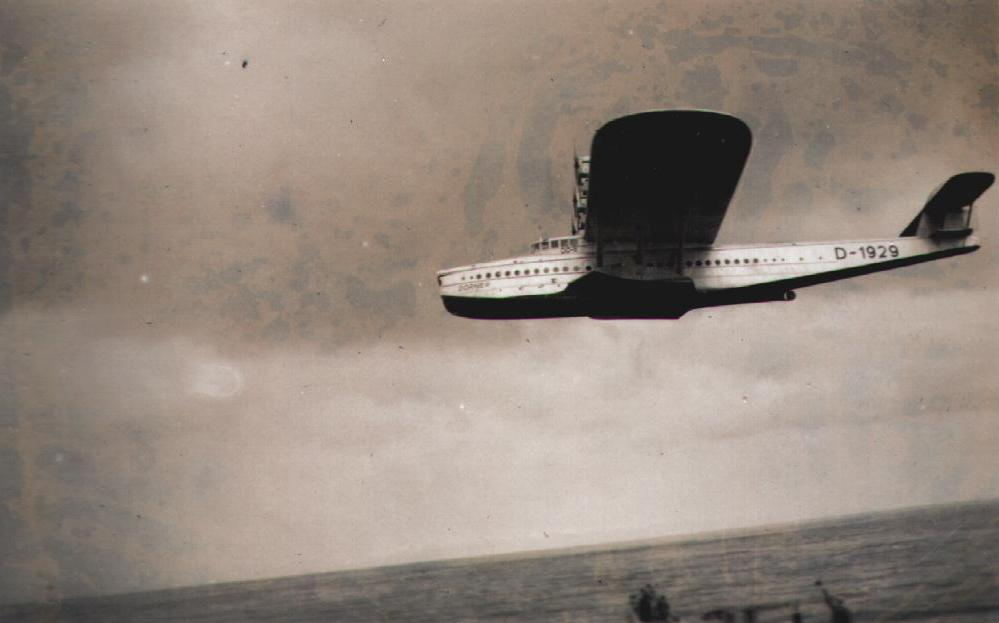
Dornier Do X over a seaport town in the Baltic, 1930

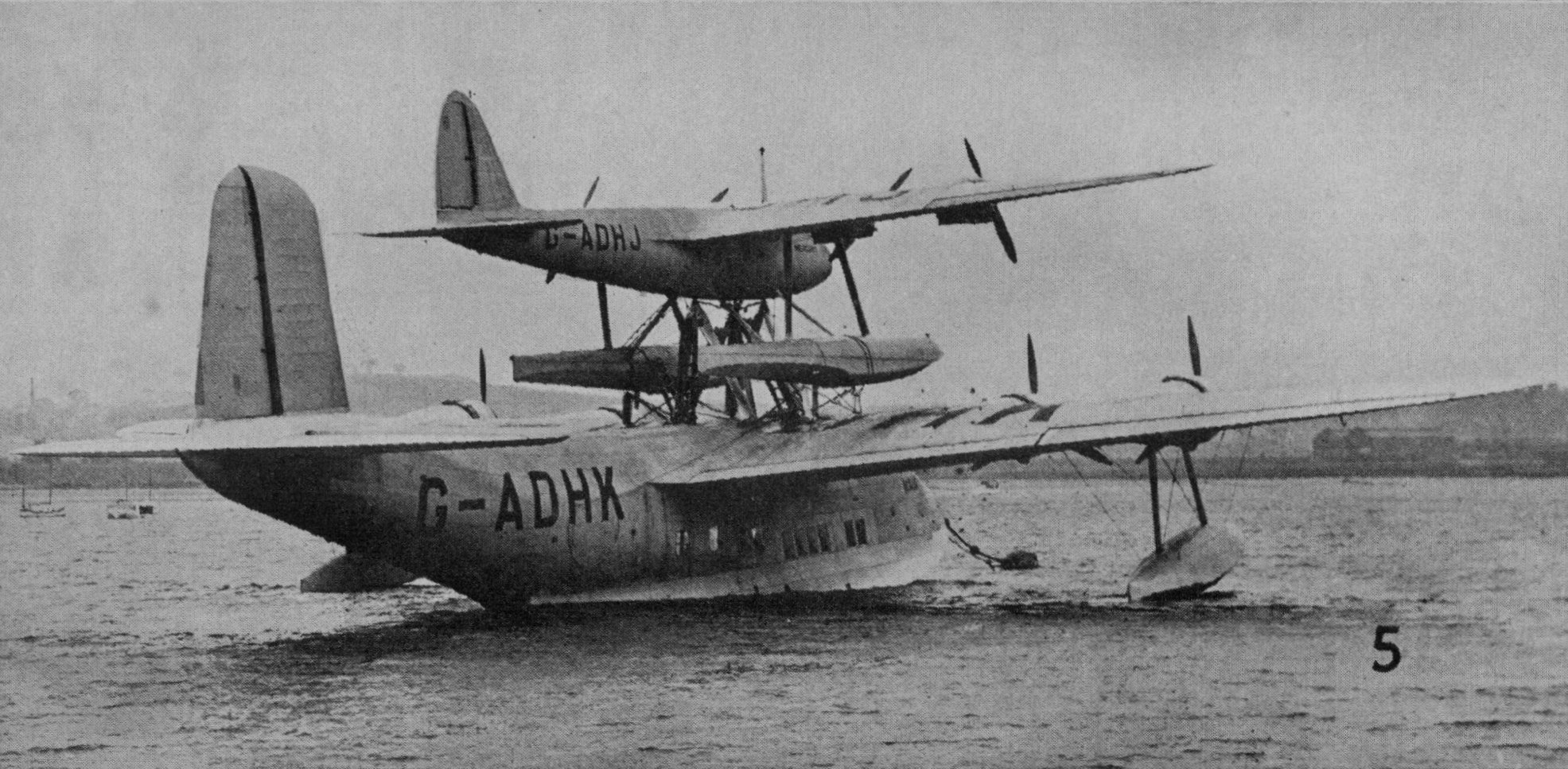
"Maia and Mercury", just before the first trans-Atlantic flight, August 1938

Delivering the mail as quickly as possible generated a lot of competition and some innovative designs. One variant of the Short Empire flying boats was the strange-looking "Maia and Mercury". It was a four-engined floatplane "Mercury" (the winged messenger) fixed on top of "Maia", a heavily modified Short Empire flying boat. The larger Maia took off, carrying the smaller Mercury loaded to a weight greater than it could take off with. This allowed the Mercury to carry sufficient fuel for a direct trans-Atlantic flight with the mail. Unfortunately this was of limited usefulness, and the Mercury had to be returned from America by ship. The Mercury did set a number of distance records before in-flight refuelling was adopted.

Sir Alan Cobham devised a method of in-flight refuelling in the 1930s. In the air, the Short Empire could be loaded with more fuel than it could take off with. Short Empire flying boats serving the trans-Atlantic crossing were refueled over Foynes; with the extra fuel load, they could make a direct trans-Atlantic flight. A Handley Page H.P.54 Harrow was used as the fuel tanker.

The German Dornier Do X flying boat was noticeably different from its UK and U.S.-built counterparts. It had wing-like protrusions from the fuselage, called sponsons, to stabilize it on the water without the need for wing-mounted outboard floats. This feature was pioneered by Claudius Dornier during the First World War on his Dornier Rs. I giant flying boat, and perfected on the Dornier Wal in 1924. The enormous Do X was powered by 12 engines and once carried 170 persons as a publicity stunt. It flew to America in 1930–31, crossing the Atlantic via an indirect route over 9 months. It was the largest flying boat of its time, but was severely underpowered and was limited by a very low operational ceiling. Only three were built, with a variety of different engines installed, in an attempt to overcome the lack of power. Two of these were sold to Italy.

The Dornier Wal was "easily the greatest commercial success in the history of marine aviation". Over 250 were built in Italy, Spain, Japan, The Netherlands and Germany. Numerous airlines operated the Dornier Wal on scheduled passenger and mail services. Wals were used by explorers, for a number of pioneering flights, and by the military in many countries. Though having first flown in 1922, from 1934 to 1938 Wals operated the over-water sectors of the Deutsche Luft Hansa South Atlantic Airmail service.

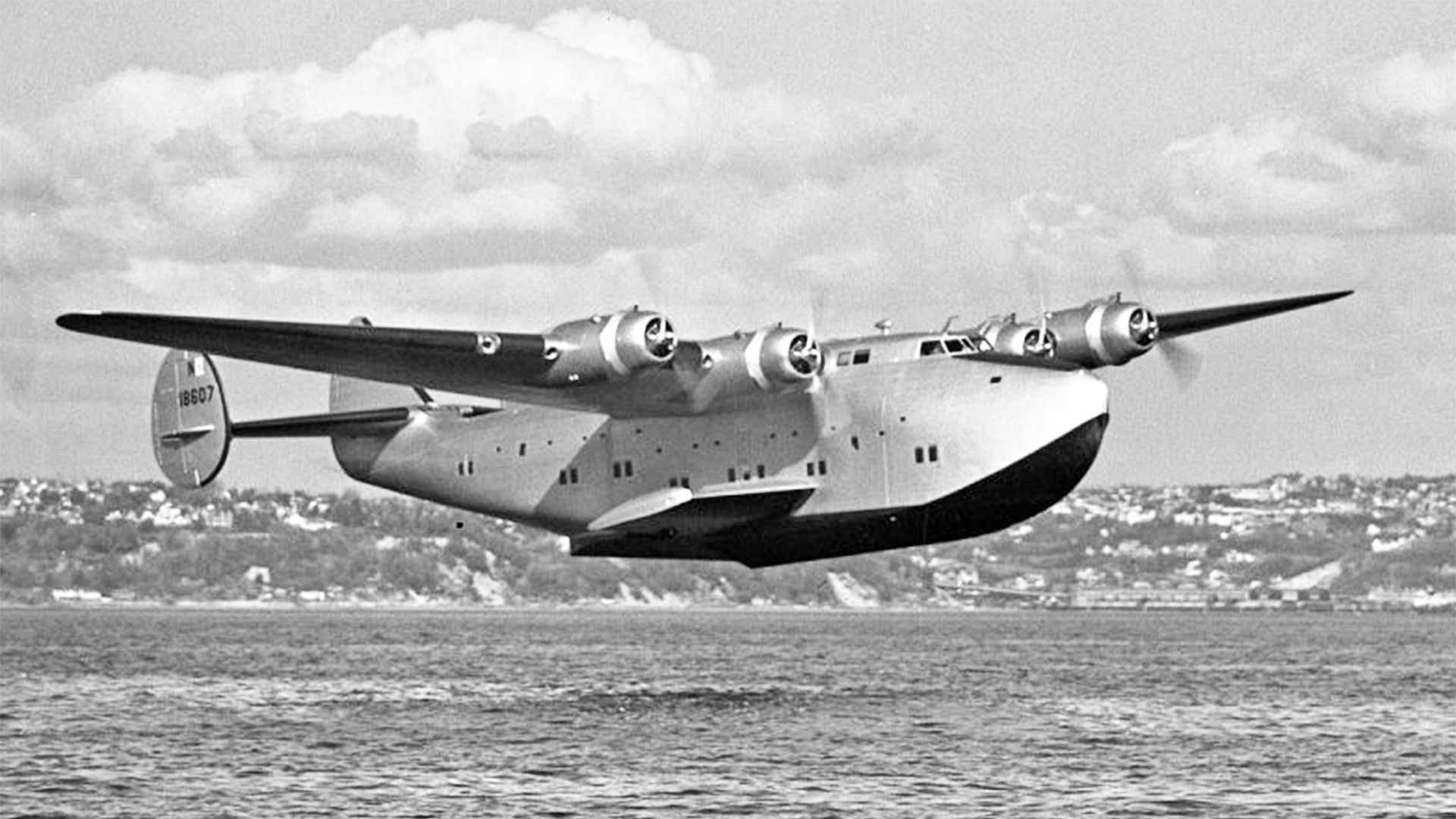
The Boeing 314 Clipper was important for opening long distance airline routes, and during WW2 they were used for transport

=== World War II ===
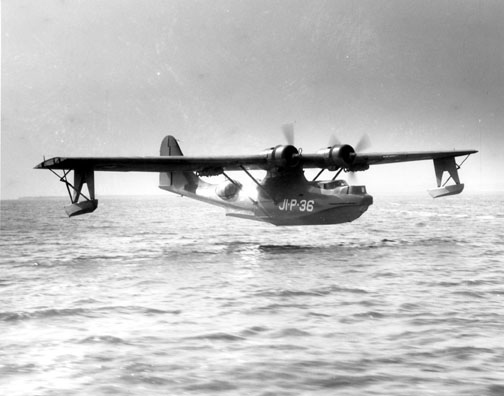
PBY Catalina

The military value of flying boats was well recognized, and every country bordering on water operated them in a military capacity at the outbreak of the Second World War. Flying boats such as the PBM Mariner patrol bomber, PBY Catalina, Short Sunderland, and Grumman Goose were procured in large numbers. The Sunderland, which was developed in parallel to the civilian Empire flying boat, was one of the most powerful and widely used flying boats throughout the conflict, while Catalinas were one of the most produced ASW of the war, with over 2,661 being produced in the US alone.

Flying boats were commonly utilized to conduct various tasks, from anti-submarine patrol to air-sea rescue and gunfire spotting for battleships. They would recover downed airmen and operate as scout aircraft over the vast distances of the Pacific Theater and the Atlantic, locating enemy vessels and sinking numerous submarines. In May 1941, the German battleship Bismarck was discovered by a PBY Catalina flying out of Castle Archdale Flying boat base, Lower Lough Erne, Northern Ireland. A flight of Catalinas spotted the Japanese fleet approaching Midway Island, beginning the Battle of Midway.

On 3 April 1940, a single Sunderland operating off Norway was attacked by six German Junkers Ju 88C fighters; during the engagement, it shot one down and damaged another until it retreated and drove off the rest. The Germans reputedly nicknamed the Sunderland the Fliegendes Stachelschwein ("Flying Porcupine") due to its defensive firepower. Sunderlands in the Mediterranean theatre proved themselves on multiple high-profile occasions, flying many evacuation missions during the German seizure of Crete, each carrying as many as 82 passengers. One Sunderland flew the reconnaissance mission to observe the Italian fleet at anchor in Taranto before the famous Royal Navy Fleet Air Arm's torpedo attack on 11 November 1940.

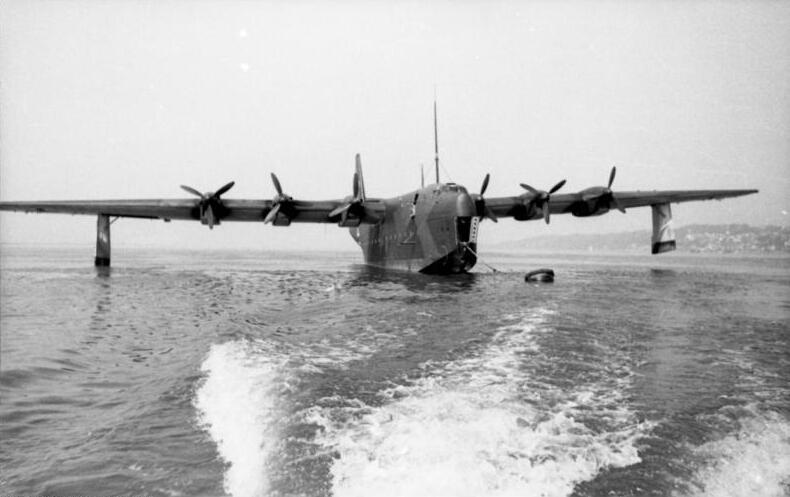
The prototype BV 238 V1 in June 1944

The largest flying boat of the war was the Blohm & Voss BV 238, which was also the heaviest plane to fly during the Second World War and the largest aircraft built and flown by any of the Axis powers. Only the first prototype ever flew, commencing flight trials in April 1944. Months later, it was strafed and partially sunk while moored on Lake Schaal, to the east of Hamburg; it never returned to flight, instead being intentionally sunk in deep water after the end of the conflict.

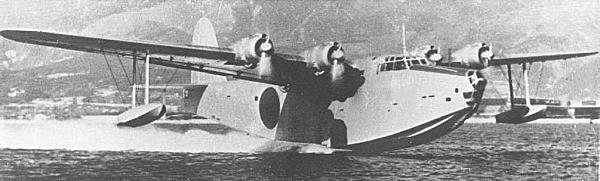
Kawanishi H8K, 1941–1945

The Imperial Japanese Navy operated what has been often described as the best flying boat of the conflict, the Kawanishi H8K. Its design was based upon its immediate predecessor, the Kawanishi H6K, but was a considerably larger and longer-ranged aircraft designed at the request of the Navy just prior to the outbreak of war. On the night of 4 March 1942, two H8Ks conducted the second raid on Pearl Harbor, refuelling en route by submarine at French Frigate Shoals in order to achieve the necessary range; poor visibility caused this attack on Pearl Harbor to fail to accomplish any significant damage. An improved H8K2 variant of the type, featuring extremely heavy defensive armament, was also introduced.

In November 1939, IAL was restructured into three separate companies: British European Airways, British Overseas Airways Corporation (BOAC), and British South American Airways (which merged with BOAC in 1949), with the change being made official on 1 April 1940. BOAC continued to operate flying boat services from the (slightly) safer confines of Poole Harbour during wartime, returning to Southampton in 1947. When Italy entered the war in June 1940, the Mediterranean was closed to allied planes, and BOAC and Qantas operated the Horseshoe Route between Durban and Sydney using Short Empire flying boats.

The Martin Company produced the prototype XPB2M Mars based on their PBM Mariner patrol bomber, with flight tests between 1941 and 1943. The Mars was converted by the Navy into a transport aircraft designated the XPB2M-1R. Satisfied with the performance, 20 of the modified JRM-1 Mars were ordered. The first of the five production Mars flying boats entered service ferrying cargo to Hawaii and the Pacific Islands on 23 January 1944. Following the end of the conflict, the Navy opted to scaled back their order, buying only the five aircraft. The five Mars were completed, and the last delivered in 1947.

The U.S. used several 4-engine flying boats during World War II, including those that had been operating as civilian airliners. This included five Boeing B-314 Clippers, four more as the C-98s; two Martin M-130 Clippers, a Martin XPB2M-1/XPB2M-1R prototype, and one JRM-1 Mars; three Sikorsky VS-44s (JR2S-1). However, the main 4-engined flying boat of the U.S. forces was the PB2Y Coronado, of which nearly 220 were used in several versions: maritime patrol, bombing, medical/hospital transport, and for regular cargo; it also served with British forces in the Battle for the Atlantic.

One of the features of flying boats that was useful for search and rescue, was the ability to land on the water and not only pull out people from the water but stay there. One of the famous cases of this was the sinking of the Indianapolis, which went down on 31 July 1945, leaving hundreds of sailors in the water. Once it was realized it was missing, it was searched for, and the first to arrive was an amphibious PBY-5A Catalina patrol plane flown by Lieutenant Commander (USN) Robert Adrian Marks. Marks and his flight crew spotted the survivors and dropped life rafts; one raft was destroyed by the drop, while others were too far away from the exhausted crew. Against standing orders not to land in the open ocean, given the unique situation and lives at risk, Marks took a vote of his crew and decided to land the aircraft in twelve-foot (3.7 m) swells. He was able to maneuver his craft to pick up 56 survivors. Space in the plane was limited, so Marks had men lashed to the wing with parachute cord. The aircraft was unflyable with so many on it but could still float. This protected many of the exhausted men from being eaten by sharks or drowning while waiting for the main rescue force to arrive. After nightfall, the destroyer escort USS Cecil J. Doyle, the first of seven rescue ships, used its searchlight as a beacon and instilled hope in those still in the water. Cecil J. Doyle and six other ships picked up the remaining survivors. After the rescue, the PBY was sunk by Cecil J. Doyle to scuttle it.

=== Post-War ===
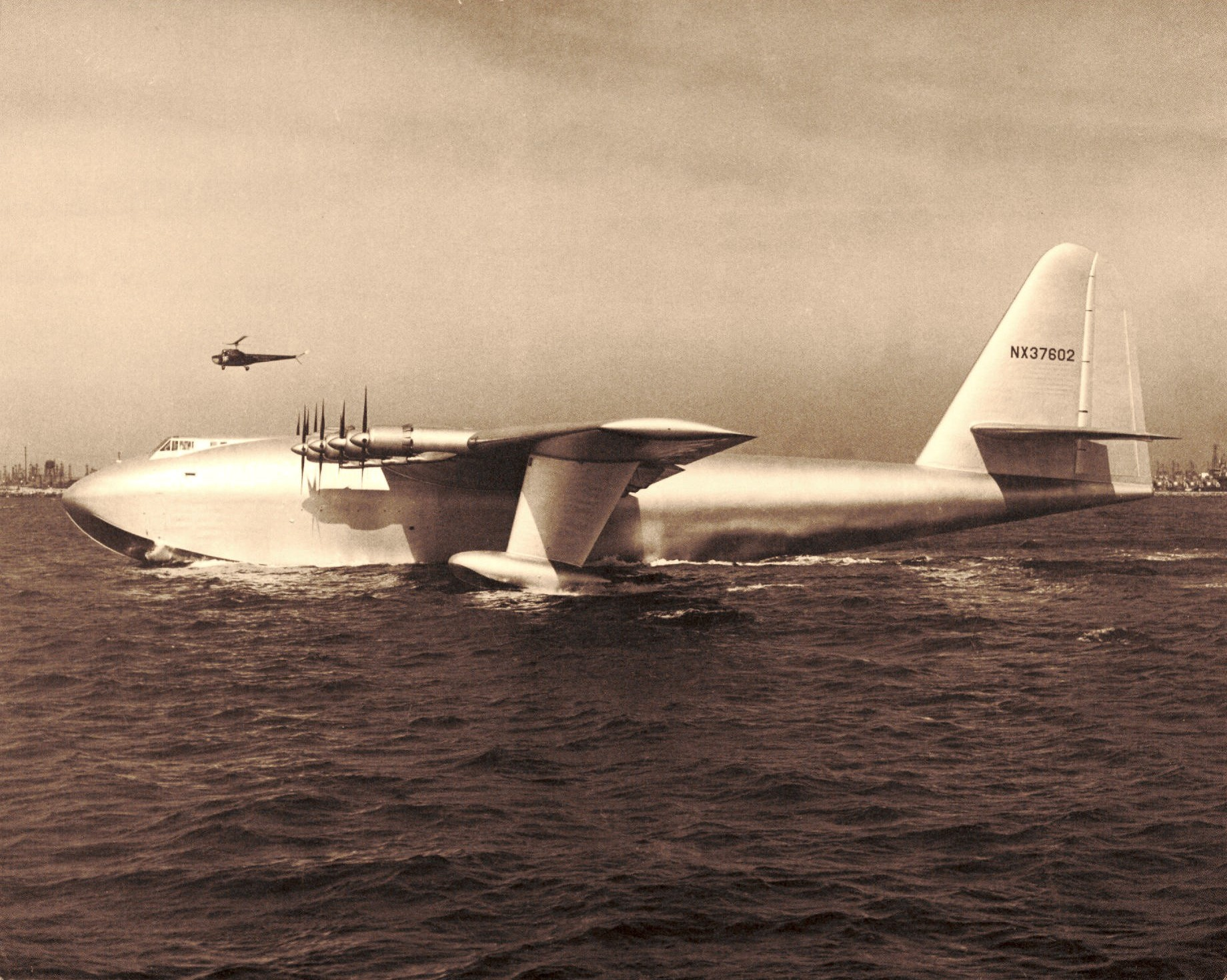
Hughes H-4 Hercules, this experimental transport was one of the largest heavier-than-air aircraft ever built

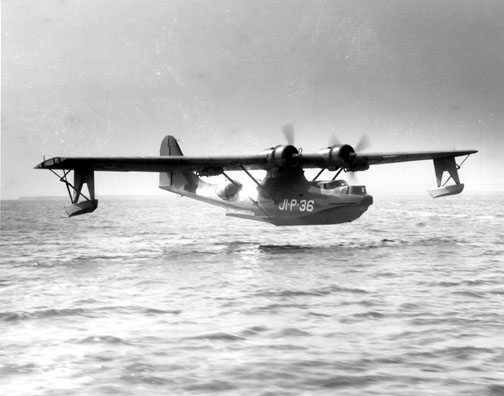
PBY Catalina at Naval Air Station Jacksonville, circa 1943

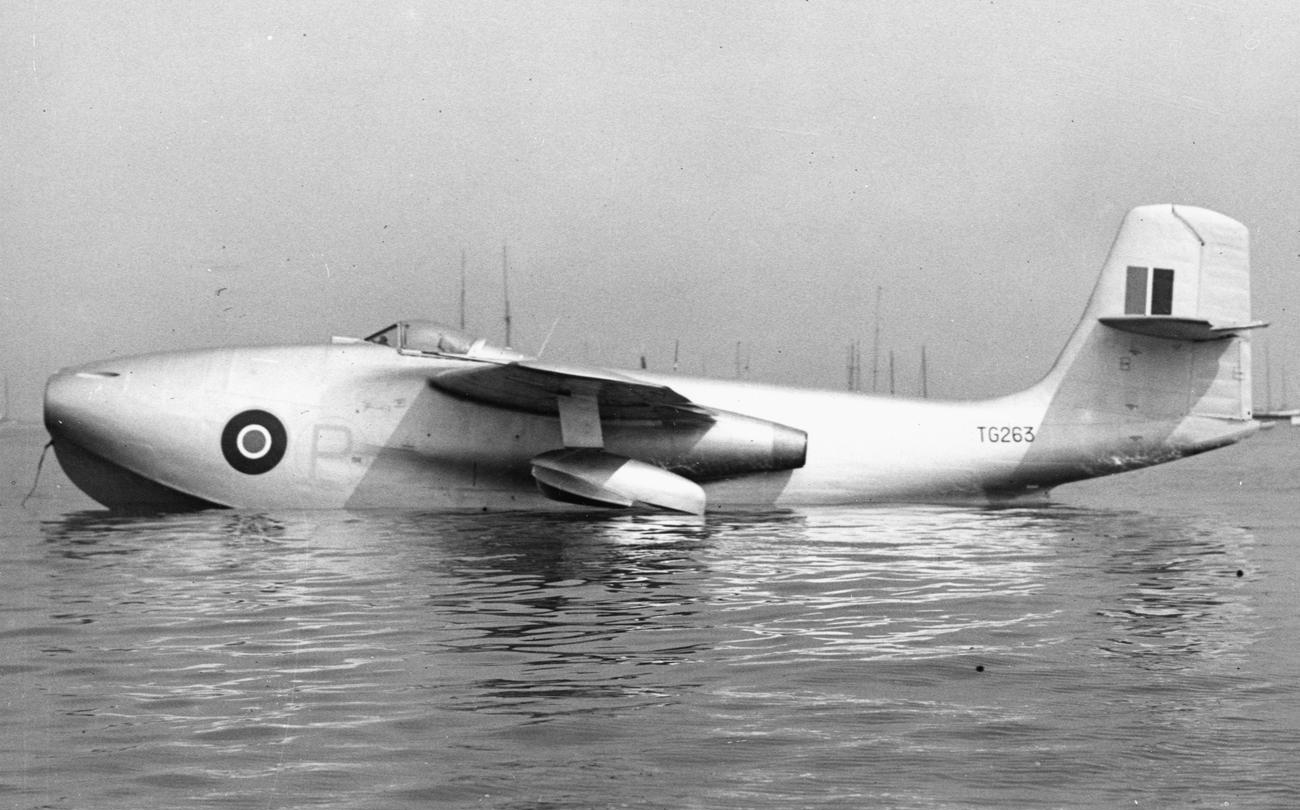
Saunders-Roe SR.A/1

After the end of the Second World War, the use of flying boats rapidly declined for several reasons. The ability to land on water became less of an advantage owing to the considerable increase in the number and length of land based runways during the conflict. Furthermore the commercial competitiveness of flying boats diminished, as their design compromised aerodynamic efficiency and speed in order to accommodate waterborne takeoff and landing. New land-based airliners such as the Lockheed Constellation and Douglas DC-4 were developed with comparable reliability, speed, and long-range. The new landplanes were relatively easy to fly, and did not require the extensive pilot training programs mandated for seaplane operations. One of the 314's most experienced pilots said, "We were indeed glad to change to DC-4s, and I argued daily for eliminating all flying boats. The landplanes were much safer. No one in the operations department ... had any idea of the hazards of flying boat operations. The main problem now was lack of the very high level of experience and competence required of seaplane pilots".

The Hughes H-4 Hercules, in development in the U.S. during the war, was even larger than the BV 238 but it did not fly until 1947. The Spruce Goose, as the 180-ton H-4 was nicknamed, was the largest flying boat ever to fly. Carried out during Senate hearings into Hughes' use of government funds on its construction, the short hop of about a mile at 70 ft above the water by the "Flying Lumberyard" was claimed by Hughes as the H-4's vindication. Cutbacks in expenditure after the war and the disappearance of its intended mission as a transatlantic transport left the H-4 with no purpose. Despite never flying again, a full-time crew of 300 workers maintained the H-4 in a flightworthy condition in a climate-controlled hangar up until Hughes' death in 1976.

In early 1944, the British Air Ministry issued a contract for the production of a small jet-powered flying boat, the Saunders-Roe SR.A/1, that was intended for use as an air defence aircraft optimised for use in the Pacific theatre. By adopting jet propulsion for the flying boat, it was possible to design it with a hull, rather than making it a floatplane, and thus eliminating the performance handicaps typically imposed upon floatplanes. It was projected to be capable of attaining speeds of up to 520 mph at 40,000 ft. Due to the SR.A/1's perceived value in the war against Imperial Japan, measures taken at an early stage of development towards immediate quantity production. However, due to the end of the conflict, pressure for the SR.A/1 quickly dissipated.

On 16 July 1947, the SR.A/1 prototype performed its maiden flight, quickly proving its soundness in terms of its performance and handling. However, officials judged that such an aircraft was unnecessary, and that the aircraft carrier had demonstrated a far more effective way to project airpower over the oceans. During late 1950, shortly after the outbreak of the Korean War, interest in the SR.A/1 programme was briefly resurrected amongst British and American officials, with whom data had been shared in the project. However, the flying boat fighter was found to be obsolete in comparison to increasingly capable land-based fighters, leading to a second and final cancellation.

During the Berlin Airlift (which lasted from June 1948 until August 1949) ten Sunderlands and two Hythes were used to transport goods from Finkenwerder on the Elbe near Hamburg to isolated Berlin, landing on the Havelsee beside RAF Gatow until it iced over. The Sunderlands were particularly used for transporting salt, as their airframes were already protected against corrosion from seawater. Transporting salt in standard aircraft risked rapid and severe structural corrosion in the event of a spillage. In addition, three Aquila Airways flying boats were used during the airlift. Bucking the trend, in 1948 Aquila Airways was founded to serve destinations that were still inaccessible to land-based aircraft. This company operated Short S.25 and Short S.45 flying boats out of Southampton on routes to Madeira, Las Palmas, Lisbon, Jersey, Mallorca, Marseille, Capri, Genoa, Montreux and Santa Margherita. From 1950 to 1957, Aquila also operated a service from Southampton to Edinburgh and Glasgow. The flying boats of Aquila Airways were also chartered for one-off trips, usually to deploy troops where scheduled services did not exist or where there were political considerations. The longest charter, in 1952, was from Southampton to the Falkland Islands. In 1953, the flying boats were chartered for troop deployment trips to Freetown and Lagos and there was a special trip from Kingston upon Hull to Helsinki to relocate a ship's crew. The airline ceased operations on 30 September 1958.

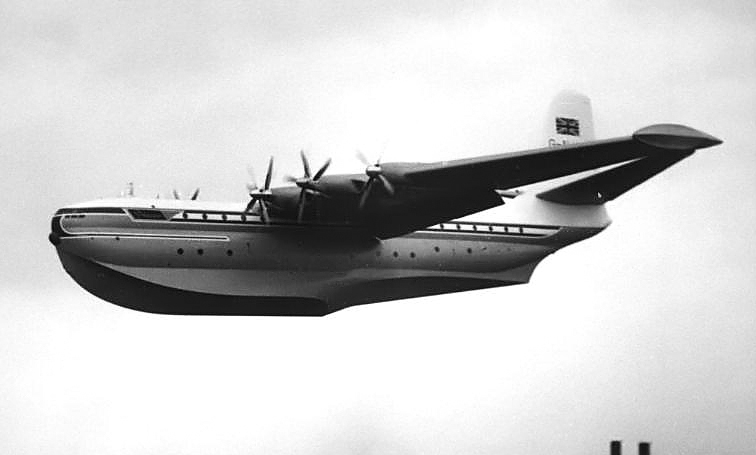
Saunders-Roe Princess G-ALUN at the Farnborough SBAC Show in September 1953

On 22 August 1952, the Saunders-Roe Princess, one of the largest and luxurious flying boats ever developed, performed its maiden flight. While flight testing of the innovative and ambitious flying boat went relatively smoothly, determining that the Princess was indeed capable of achieving its envisioned performance figures, only one prototype of the type would ever fly. Despite the granting of a certificate of airworthiness and representing the pinnacle of flying boat development of the era, no customers were willing to place firm orders for the Princess. This is despite reports that several would-be operators, including Aquila Airways and Aero Spacelines, had attempted to purchase examples.

In 1951, BOAC performed an in-depth reevaluation of its standing requirements, and determined that the airline had no present need for the Princess, or any new large flying boat. The airline had already chosen to terminate its existing flying boat services during the previous year. Up until 1974, Ansett Australia operated a flying boat service from Rose Bay to Lord Howe Island using Short Sandringhams.

The US Navy continued to operate flying boats (notably the Martin P5M Marlin) until the late 1960s. During the 1950s, the US Navy had encouraged the development of a jet-powered flying boat bomber, the Martin P6M Seamaster; however, its development was protracted by unfavourable handling characteristics above Mach 0.8, including rapid changes in directional trim, severe buffeting, and wing drop, which made it unfeasible for service until these tendencies were rectified. Following the US Navy's withdrawal of support, Martin tried unsuccessfully to market the SeaMaster to the civilian market, rebranding it as the SeaMistress, but the initiative picked up no takers.

During the 1950s, the Japanese aircraft manufacturer ShinMeiwa Industries conducted internal design studies into developing flying boats that would exhibit greater levels of seaworthiness than their predecessors. Over the following decade, the company developed the Shin Meiwa US-1A, a new generation flying boat, to meet Japan's requirement for a maritime patrol aircraft capable of ASW operations. The initial model, designated PS-1, was quickly followed by a dedicated search-and-rescue (SAR) variant, the US-1, although this was technically an amphibian rather than a flying boat through its modified designs. Shin Meiwa developed further flying boat concepts around this period, including the Shin Meiwa MS (Medium Seaplane) a 300-passenger long-range flying boat with its own beaching gear; and the gargantuan Shin Meiwa GS (Giant Seaplane) with a capacity of 1200 passengers seated on three decks.

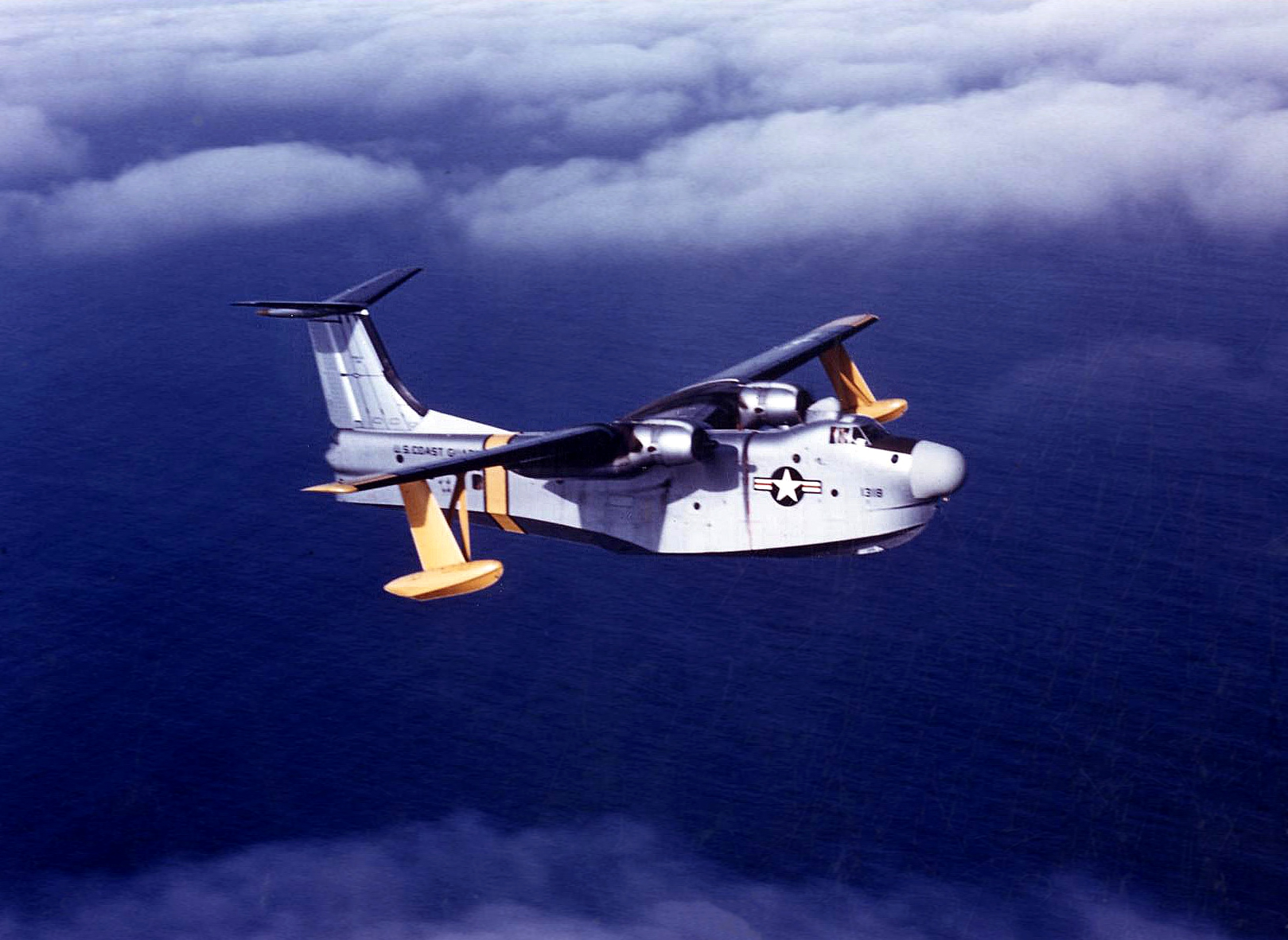
United States Coast Guard P5M-2G Marlin in 1958

=== Late 20th century ===
The U.S. Navy continued to operate flying boats (notably the Martin P5M Marlin) until the early 1970s. The Navy even experimented with the Martin Seamaster jet-powered seaplane bomber, as well as the Convair F2Y Sea Dart supersonic interceptor.

The U.S. Coast Guard operated HU-16 Albatross (affectionately known as the 'goat') well into the 1980s, retiring them as the airframes clocked out their flying 11 thousand flying hours. About twenty were still in service in the 1970s, and the last operation flight was in 1983. The aircraft was very popular with the Coast Guard due to its unique capabilities compared to other types, and was noted for its versatility, range, and ability to land on water which was especially useful for water rescues.

Ansett Australia operated a flying-boat service from Rose Bay to Lord Howe Island until 1974, using Short Sandringhams.

On 18 December 1990, Pilot Tom Casey completed the first round-the-world flight in a floatplane with only water landings using a Cessna 206 named Liberty II.

=== Twenty-first century developments ===
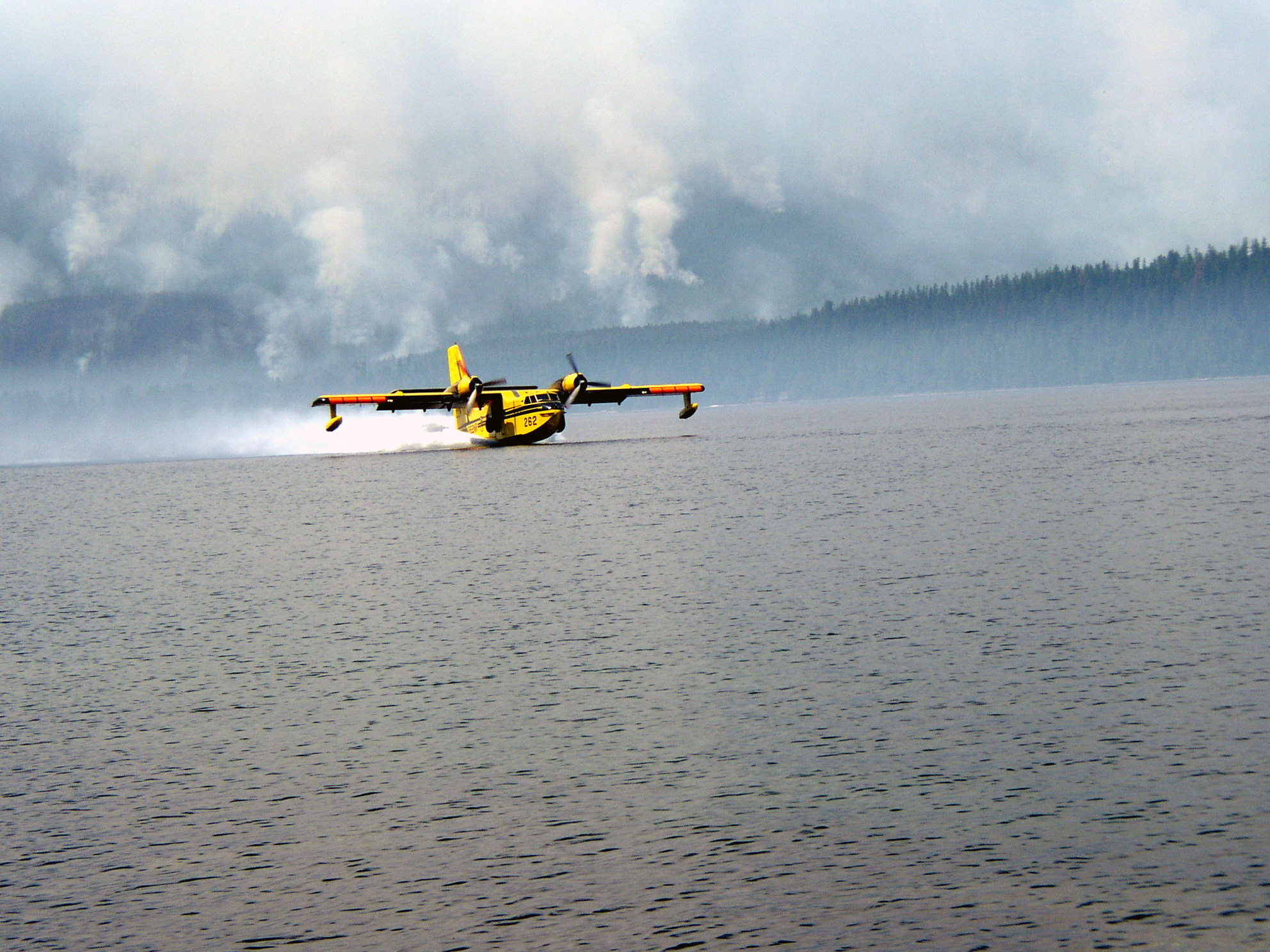
Canadair CL-215 is used for dropping water on forest fires

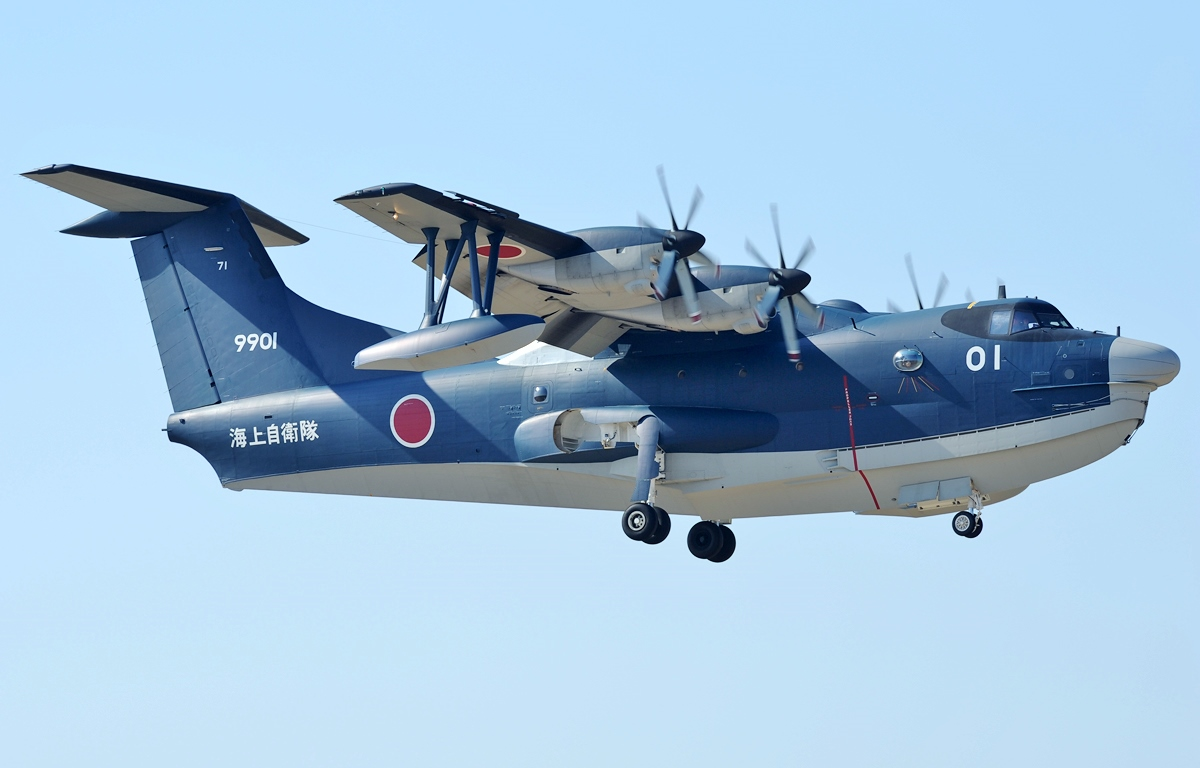
ShinMaywa flying boat of the JMSDF

The shape of the Short Empire, a British flying boat of the 1930s was a harbinger of the shape of 20th century aircraft yet to come. Today, however, true flying boats have largely been replaced by floatplanes or amphibious aircraft with wheels. The Beriev Be-200 twin-jet amphibious aircraft is used for fighting forest fires. There are also several experimental/kit amphibians such as the Volmer Sportsman, Quikkit Glass Goose, Airmax Sea Max, Aeroprakt A-24, and Seawind 300C.

The ShinMaywa US-2 is a large STOL amphibious aircraft designed for air-sea rescue work, derived from the earlier US-1. The first example was delivered to the Japan Maritime Self Defense Force in 2009; the service has replaced its US-1 fleet with the US-2. A civilian-orientated fire-fighting variant of the US-2 has also been designed and promoted to prospective customers.

The Canadair CL-415, an improved model of the Canadair CL-215, remains in production during the twenty-first century. The type has been primarily used for forest fire suppression, but has also seen use in other capacities, such as a maritime patrol aircraft. The German company Dornier Seawings, an off-shoot of the original Dornier company, has repeatedly announced plans to launch production of its SeaStar composite flying boat. In February 2016, Dornier launched the improved CD2 SeaStar.

During the 2010s, the state-owned company Aviation Industry Corporation of China (AVIC) launched a program to develop a massive new amphibian, the AVIC AG600. On 24 December 2017, it made its maiden flight from Zhuhai Jinwan Airport.

The ICON A5 is an amphibious aircraft in the light-sport class. The Progressive Aerodyne Searey is an amphibious aircraft in the light-sport class, available as a kit built experimental or factory built aircraft. Shortly after the dissolution of the Soviet Union two separated scientific production associations (NPO) in Samara started to make flying boats for a new developing Russian general aviation. Today NPO Aerovolga makes its La series with La-8 being its latest while NPO Chaika makes L series with L-65 being its latest in a line-up.

== Uses and operation ==
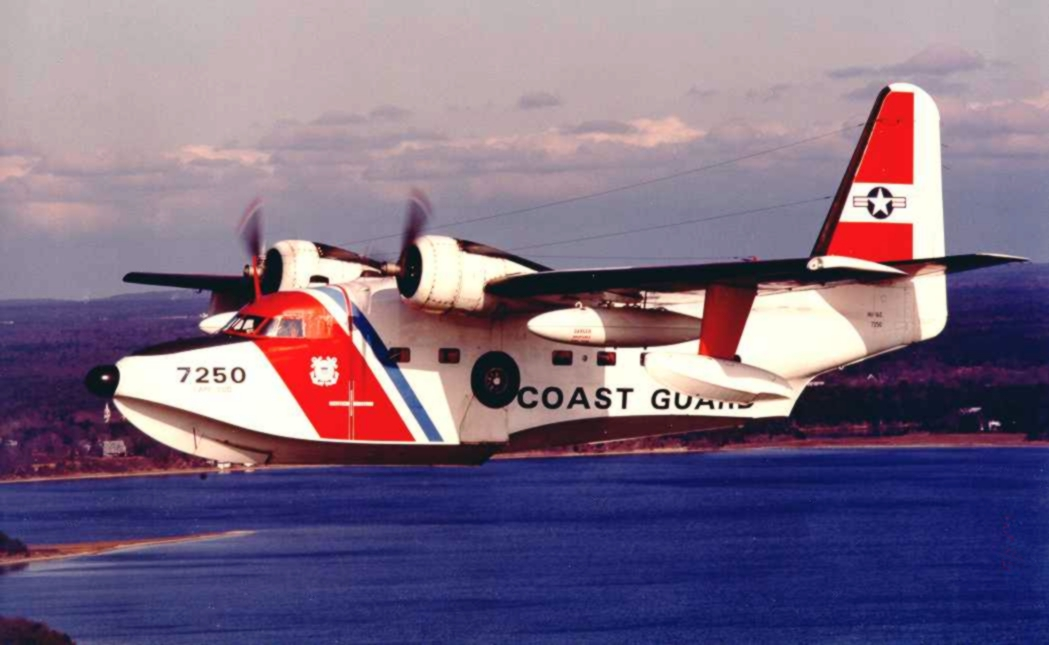
U.S. Coast Guard HU-16E from CGAS Cape Cod in the 1970s.

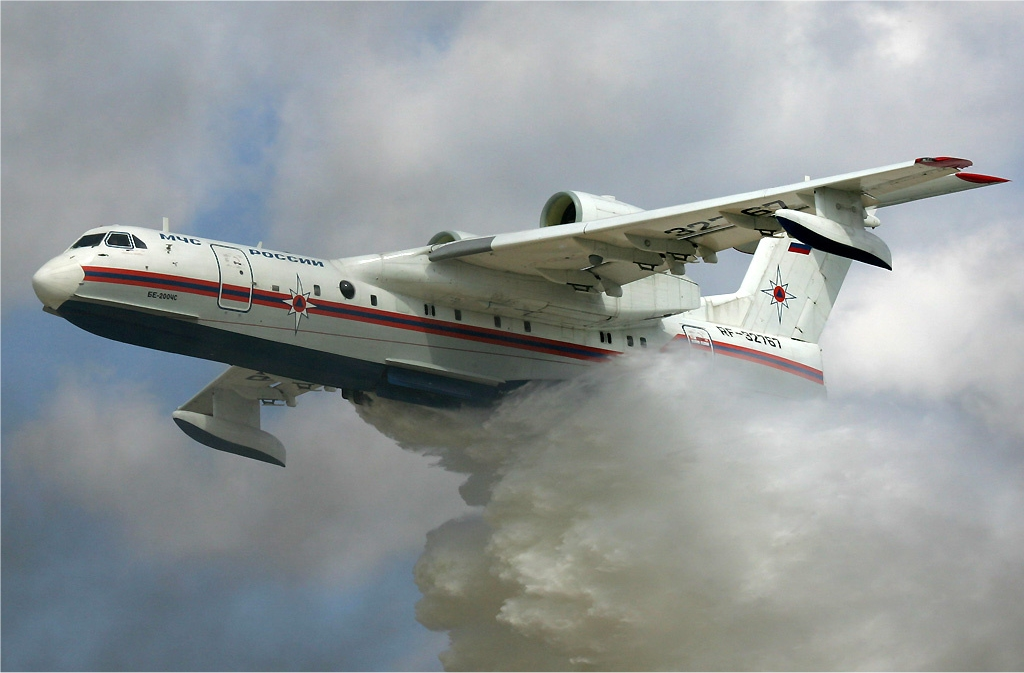
Beriev Be-200 operating as a waterbomber

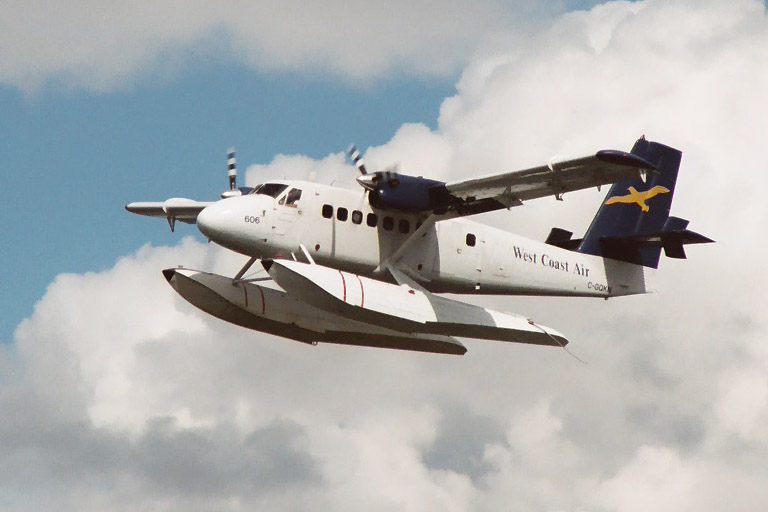
De Havilland Canada DHC-6 Twin Otter float plane with West Coast Air

Many modern civilian aircraft have a floatplane variant, usually as utility transports to lakes and other remote areas. Most of these are offered as third-party modifications under a supplemental type certificate (STC), although there are several aircraft manufacturers that build floatplanes from scratch, and a few that continue to build flying boats. Some older flying boats remain in service for firefighting duty, as well as the Canadair CL-415 which remains in production as of 2022, and Chalk's Ocean Airways operated a fleet of Grumman Mallards in passenger service until service was suspended after a crash on December 19, 2005, which was linked to maintenance, not to design of the aircraft. Purely water-based seaplanes have largely been supplanted by amphibious aircraft. Seaplanes can only take off and land on water with little or no wave action and, like other aircraft, have trouble in extreme weather. The size of waves a given design can withstand depends on, among other factors, the aircraft's size, hull or float design, and its weight, all making for a much more unstable aircraft, limiting actual operational days. Flying boats can typically handle rougher water and are generally more stable than floatplanes while on the water.

Seaplanes are also used in remote areas such as the Alaskan and Canadian wilderness, especially in areas with a large number of lakes convenient for takeoff and landing. They may operate on a charter basis, provide scheduled service, or be operated by residents of the area for personal use. There are seaplane operators that offer services between islands such as in the Caribbean Sea or the Maldives. Usually these are converted from reliable commercial models, and fitted for floats.

One floatplane conversion under consideration in the 2020s is a floatplane version of the C-130 for special military applications.

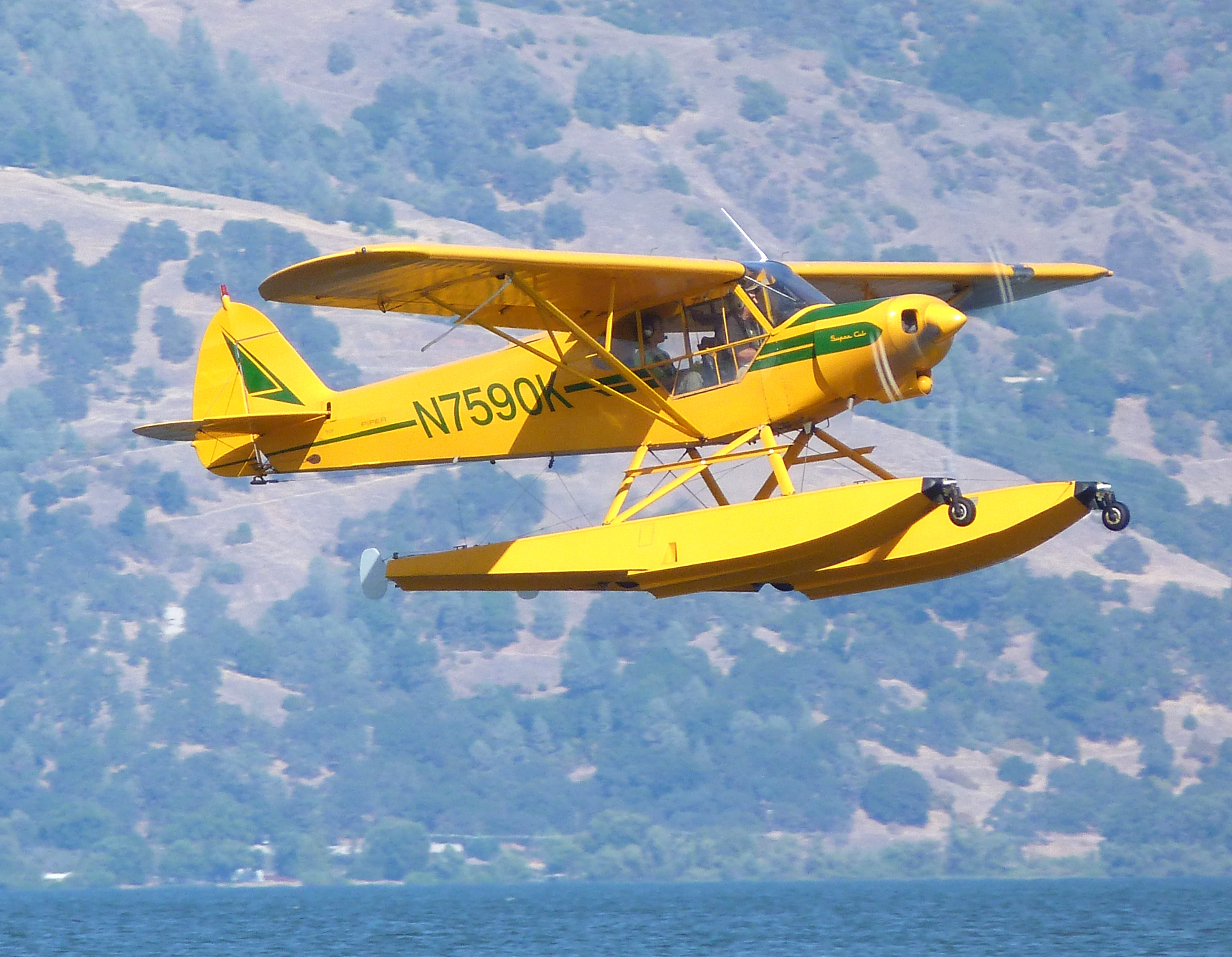
Floatplanes allow access to most remote aquatic locations

Since World War II and the advent of helicopters, advanced aircraft carriers and land-based aircraft, military seaplanes have stopped being used. This, coupled with the increased availability of civilian airstrips, has greatly reduced the number of flying boats being built. However, many modern civilian aircraft have floatplane variants, most offered as third-party modifications under a supplemental type certificate (STC), although there are several aircraft manufacturers that build floatplanes from scratch. These floatplanes have found their niche as one type of bush plane, for light duty transportation to lakes and other remote areas as well as to small/hilly islands without proper airstrips. They may operate on a charter basis (including pleasure flights), provide scheduled service, or be operated by residents of the area for private, personal use.

== See also ==
- List of flying boats and floatplanes
- Ground effect vehicle
- IAR 111
- Navalised aircraft
- Aerosub
- Observation seaplane
- Seaplane tender
- RAPT system
