= Tigerfish Aviation =

Aerospace research and development company

Tigerfish Aviation is an aerospace research and development company based in Norwood, South Australia. The company has been developing a retractable pontoon system for the float plane industry, which has been patented as Retractable Amphibious Pontoon Technology or RAPT since the late 1990s.

== RAPT system ==
Retractable Amphibious Pontoon Technology(RAPT) is a retractable float concept which aims to reduce aerodynamic drag by folding the floats into a pannier under the fuselage of the aircraft. The reduction in drag increases performance of the aircraft and reduces its operating cost, such as fuel consumption. Reduction in drag increases the range, payload, speed, and productivity of the aircraft. Drag reduction occurs due to the reduction of surface area exposed to the airstream and concealing the hydrodynamic features of the floats. It is designed as a retrofit, and is potentially capable of application to any existing aircraft. The technology has been applied on a one-sixth scale Cessna Caravan for concept-proving.

=== Technical details ===
As of 2010, Dornier 228 NG is the first proposed aircraft to be retrofitted for the RAPT system, besides the small-scale Cessna. The retractable float system can be used in a varying range of aircraft including regional aircraft, utility aircraft, executive aircraft, military transports, VLJs, and UAVs. The University of Adelaide, with assistance of the South Australian Government, has performed CFD analysis and studies on the DHC-6 Twin Otter showing that the RAPT system would result in a cost benefit. Unlike traditional floats, RAPT pontoons are made of lightweight composite materials, but suffer additional mass penalties due to the electric, hydraulic and structural systems required to retract the pontoons. Total mass penalty has been estimated at 1,420 pounds (640 kg) for a Dornier 228 NG variant.

== See also ==
- Float plane
- Amphibious aircraft
- Seaplane
- Flying boats
- Dornier 228 NG
