= Pratt & Whitney Canada PW100 =

Aircraft engine family

PW100
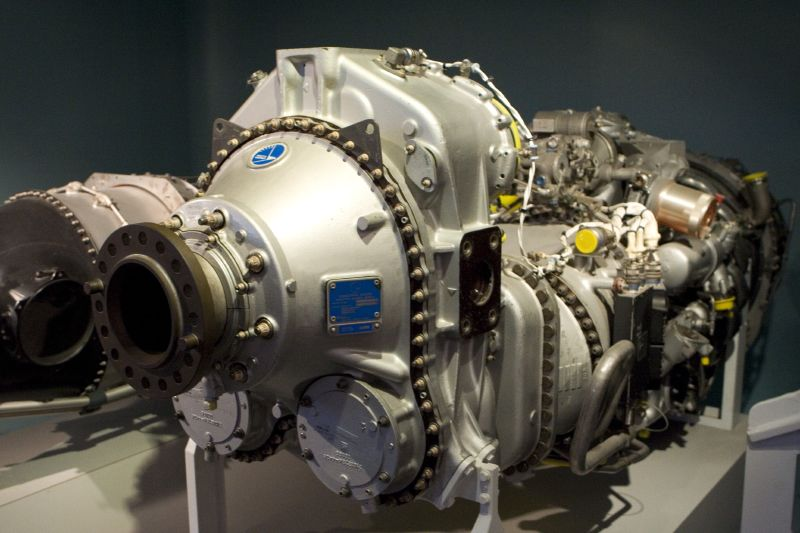
- PW120 in Canada Aviation Museum
- Type: Turboprop
- National origin: Canada
- Manufacturer: Pratt & Whitney Canada
- First run: March 1981
- Major applications: ATR 42/ATR 72; De Havilland Canada Dash 8; EADS CASA C-295; Embraer EMB 120 Brasilia; Fokker 50; Xian MA60
- Number built: >8,000 (as of 2014)

The Pratt & Whitney Canada PW100 aircraft engine family is a series of 1,800 to 5,000 shaft horsepower (1,300 to 3,700 kW) turboprops manufactured by Pratt & Whitney Canada. Pratt & Whitney Canada dominates the turboprop market with 89% of the turboprop regional airliner installed base in 2016, leading GE Aviation and Allison Engine Company.

== Development ==
The engine was first introduced as a technology demonstrator in 1977. The PW100 was first tested in March 1981, made its initial flight in February 1982 on a Vickers Viscount testbed aircraft, and then entered service in December 1984 on a Dash 8 regional aircraft for NorOntair.

The PW150 engine was introduced on 24 April 1995, when Bombardier selected the engine for the launch of its de Havilland Dash 8-400 regional turboprop. The PW150 was a higher-power version of the PW100 series, with the low-pressure compressor changed from a single-stage centrifugal compressor to a three-stage axial compressor, and the turbine modified to have improved cooling. The power rating was increased from 2,750 shaft horsepower (2,050 kilowatts) in the PW127 to 4,920 shp (3,670 kW) in the PW150, although the engine was thermodynamically capable of 6,500–7,500 shp (4,800–5,600 kW).

At the 2021 Dubai Air Show, Pratt & Whitney Canada introduced the PW127XT (extended-time-on-wing) series. The PW127XT, which is intended to replace the PW127M variant, reduces the number of engine overhauls within 10 years to two from three. The engine maintenance interval (time-on-wing) is increased from 14,000 hours to 20,000 hours and would use three percent less fuel than the PW127M. The engine series will premiere as the standard powerplant on all new ATR 42 and ATR 72 aircraft, with a launch order from Air Corsica using the PW127XT-M engine model. The PW127XT-N variant, which is designed for the ATR 72-600, has the same mechanical power rating as the PW127XT-M but has a higher thermodynamic power rating.

== Design ==
Originally called the PT7, the PW100 uses a relatively unusual three-shaft engine configuration. In the PW100, a centrifugal low-pressure (LP) impeller driven by a single-stage LP turbine, supercharges a contra-rotating centrifugal high-pressure (HP) impeller, driven by a single-stage HP turbine. (One model, the PW150, uses a 3-stage axial LP compressor instead.) Power is delivered to the offset propeller reduction gearbox through a third shaft, connected to a two-stage free (power) turbine. The gearbox has two stages, yielding a reduction ratio between 15.4 and 17.16. The first stage uses double helical gears, followed by a second stage with straight spur gears.

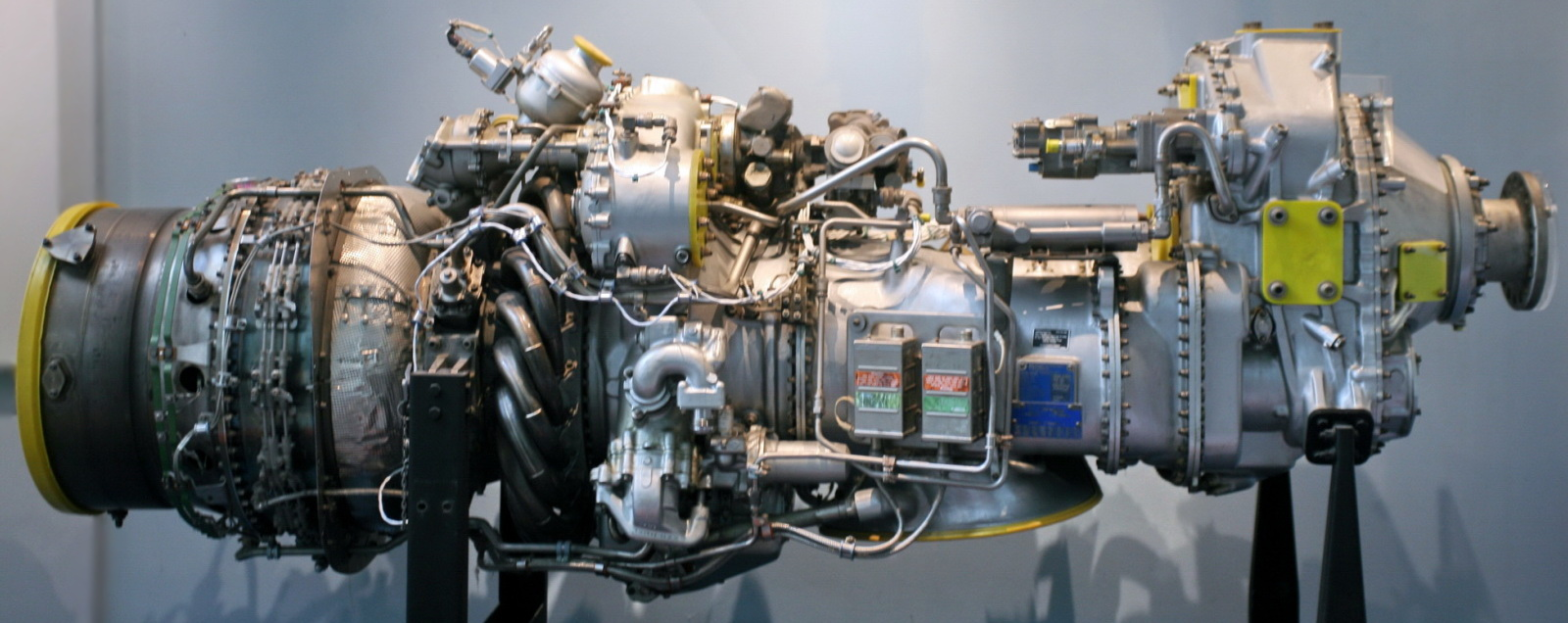
Pratt & Whitney Canada PW123, from right to left: propeller mount, gearbox, air intake below, accessories surrounding the compressor, combustor, turbine and exhaust

== Variants ==
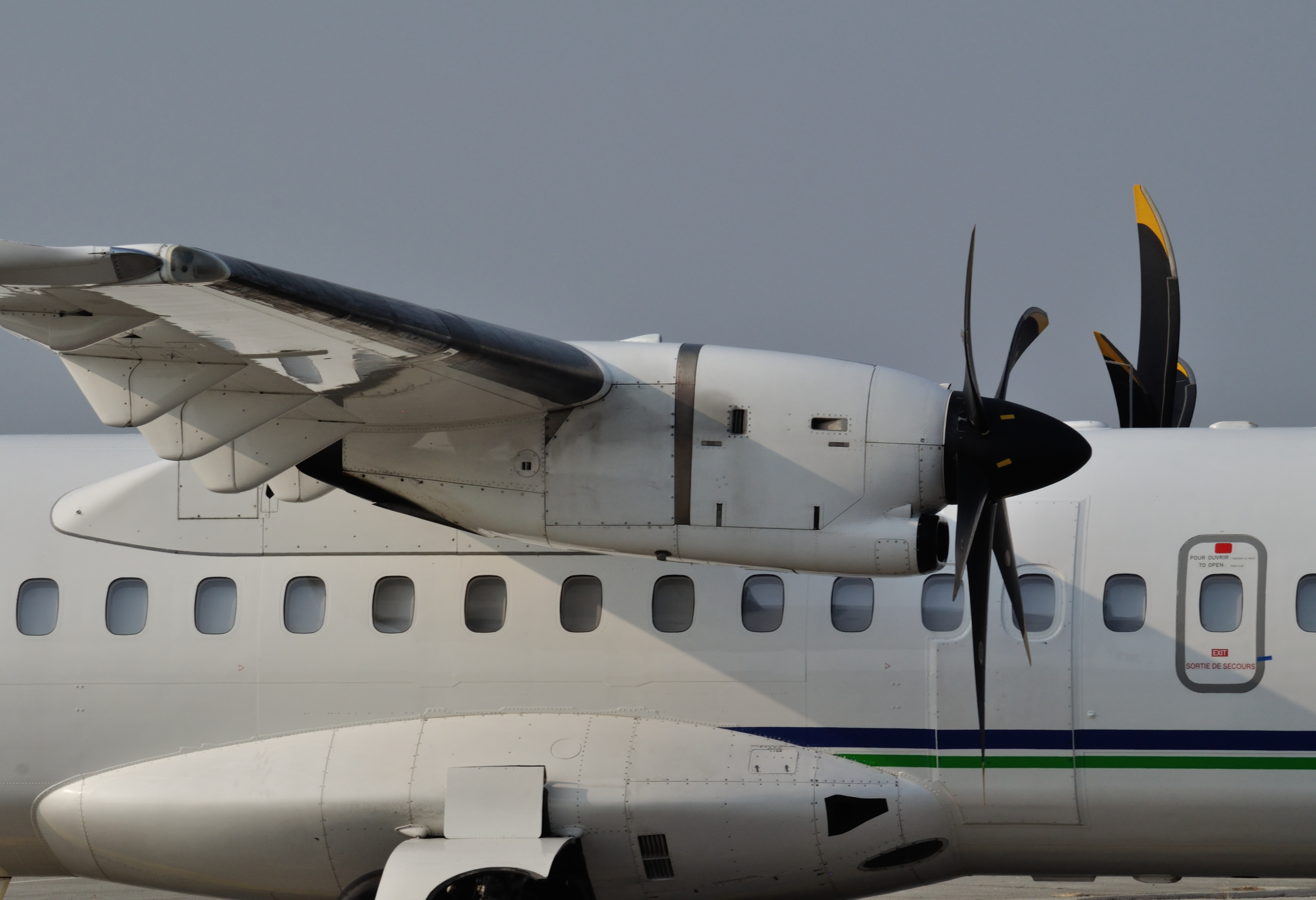
A PW127E installed on an ATR 72-500

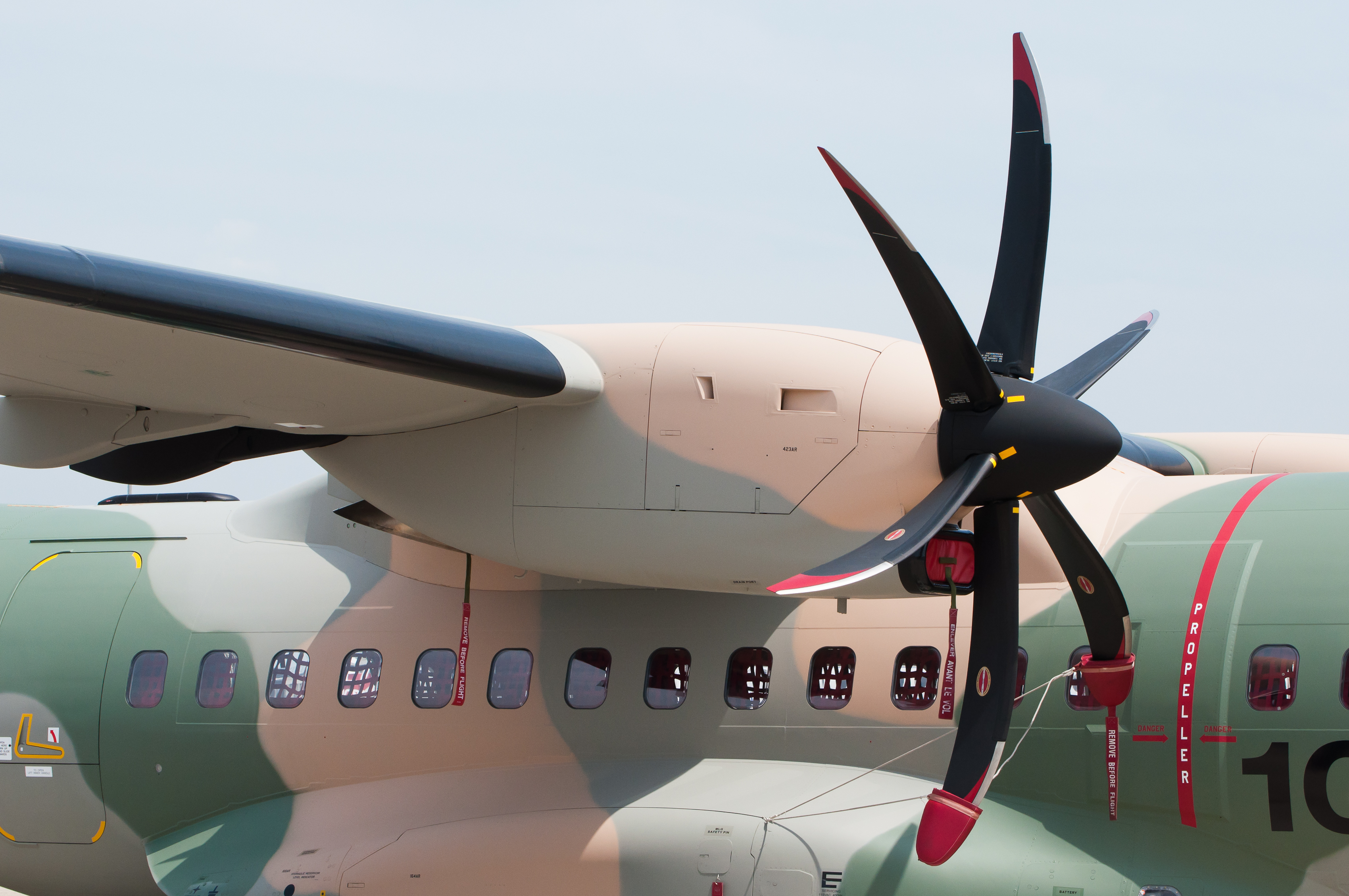
PW127G engine on a CASA C-295 aircraft at Paris Air Show 2013

The last two digits of each variant model number represent the nominal power at takeoff, in hundreds of horsepower.

Certified variants
Variant	Certification	Rating	Notes
PW115	1983-12	1,500 shp (1,100 kW)	No longer in service.
PW118	1986-03-11	1,892 eshp (1,411 kW)	Can be converted to a PW118A.
PW118A	1987-06-30	1,893 eshp (1,412 kW)	Can be converted to a PW118B.
PW118B	1996-02-29	1,892 eshp (1,412 kW)	
PW119A	1992-03-04	1,948 eshp (1,453 kW)	Can be converted to a PW119B.
PW119B	1993-04-05	1,941 eshp (1,448 kW)	Can be converted to a PW119C.
PW119C	1995-04-21	1,941 eshp (1,448 kW)	Can be converted to a PW119B.
PW120	1983-12-16	1,787 eshp (1,333 kW)	Can be converted to a PW121.
PW120A	1984-09-18	1,892 eshp (1,411 kW)	Can be converted to a PW121.
PW121	1987-02-18	2,044 eshp (1,524 kW)	Can be converted to a PW120.
PW121A	1995-03-24	1,992 eshp (1,465 kW)	
PW123	1987-06-30	2,261 eshp (1,687 kW)	Can be converted to a PW123B, C, D, or E.
PW123AF	1989-06-14	2,261 eshp (1,686 kW)	Can be converted to PW123.
PW123B	1991-12-20	2,262 eshp (1,687 kW)	Can be converted to a PW123.
PW123C	1994-05-13	2,054 eshp (1,532 kW)	Can be converted to a PW123 or D.
PW123D	1994-05-13	2,054 eshp (1,532 kW)	Can be converted to a PW123 or C.
PW123E	1995-02-13	2,261 eshp (1,687 kW)	Can be converted to a PW123.
PW124B	1988-05-25	2,522 eshp (1,881 kW)	Can be converted to a PW123 or PW127.
PW125B	1987-05-01	2,261 eshp (1,687 kW)	
PW126	1987-05-01	2,323 eshp (1,732 kW)	Can be converted to a PW123 or PW126A.
PW126A	1989-06-14	2,493 eshp (1,859 kW)	Can be converted to a PW123 or PW127D.
PW127	1992-02-04	2,619 eshp (1,953 kW)	Can be converted to a PW127C, E, or F.
PW127A	1992-02-10	2,620 eshp (1,954 kW)	Can be converted to a PW127B.
PW127B	1992-11-05	2,619 eshp (1,953 kW)	
PW127C	1992-10-06	2,880 eshp (2,148 kW)	
PW127D	1993-03-31	2,880 eshp (2,148 kW)	Can be converted to a PW127B.
PW127E	1994-12-16	2,516 eshp (1,876 kW)	Can be converted to a PW127M.
PW127F	1996-08-30	2,619 eshp (1,953 kW)	Can be converted to a PW127M.
PW127G	1997-09-19	3,058 eshp (2,281 kW)	Used in CASA C295.
PW127H	1998-10-23	2,880 eshp (2,148 kW)	
PW127J	1999-01-04	2,880 eshp (2,148 kW)	
PW127M	2007-12-07	2,619 eshp (1,953 kW)	Used in the ATR 72-600s.
PW127N	2014-05-05	2,619 eshp (1,953 kW)	
PW127XT-L	2023-08-28	2,619 eshp (1,953 kW)	Developed for use on STOL (short takeoff and landing) aircraft
PW127XT-M	2022-08-25	2,621 eshp (1,954 kW)	Used in the ATR 72-600s.
PW127XT-N	2023-06-22	2,621 eshp (1,954 kW)	
PW150A	1998-06-24	5,492 eshp (4,095 kW)	For the Q400 and An-132. (Note: Is capable of up to 7,000 shp (5,200 kW). Has a 3 stage axial low pressure compressor instead of the centrifugal NL unit on other variants. On the Q400, it sports a larger, six-bladed 13.5 ft (4.1 m) Dowty R408 propeller that spins at slower rates of 1,020 rpm at takeoff, 900 rpm at climb and 850 rpm at cruise.)

=== Other variants ===
PW119
1,815 shp (1,353 kW), no longer in service.
PW124
2,400 shp (1,800 kW), no longer in service.
PW124A
No longer in service.
PW125
No longer in service.
PW125A
No longer in service.
PW127TS
2,500 shp (1,900 kW) turboshaft version that powered the first 2 prototypes of the Mil Mi-38 helicopter and was to be used on the Mi-38-1 variant.
PW127XT-S
Selected to power the Deutsche Aircraft D328eco in June 2022. The first set of development engines were delivered during the second half of 2025.
PW130
Unsuccessfully offered for the Saab 2000 and IPTN N-250 aircraft. Proposed for the unbuilt Fokker 50-400 aircraft.
PW150 Twin Pack
Proposed powerplant for the Airbus A400M. Two PW150-based engines would be used to drive a single propeller. The powerplant was eliminated from contention by Airbus in early June 1999, since it was short of providing the 9,000 shp (6,700 kW) required to drive the eight-bladed propeller at the time, and its specific fuel consumption (SFC) was excessive.
PW150B
Proposed powerplant for the Shaanxi Y-8F-600. Abandoned in December 2008 when the United States government barred a U.S.-based subcontractor from exporting the engine control software for the PW150B.
PW150C
Proposed powerplant for the Xian MA700. Includes a third-stage power turbine, larger-diameter propellers, modified reduction gearbox, and optimized low-pressure compressor. Has higher thrust, higher speed, and extended range compared to the PW150A. Blocked from an export license by the Canadian government in 2020, because of the Chinese government's retaliatory detention of Canadian citizens (the "two Michaels") starting in 2018.
ST18M
Marine application for the PW100.
ST40
PW150 derivative adapted for the Bombardier JetTrain, which was proposed for use in high-speed train travel in North America.
ST40M
Marine application for the PW150A.

== Applications ==
=== Aircraft ===
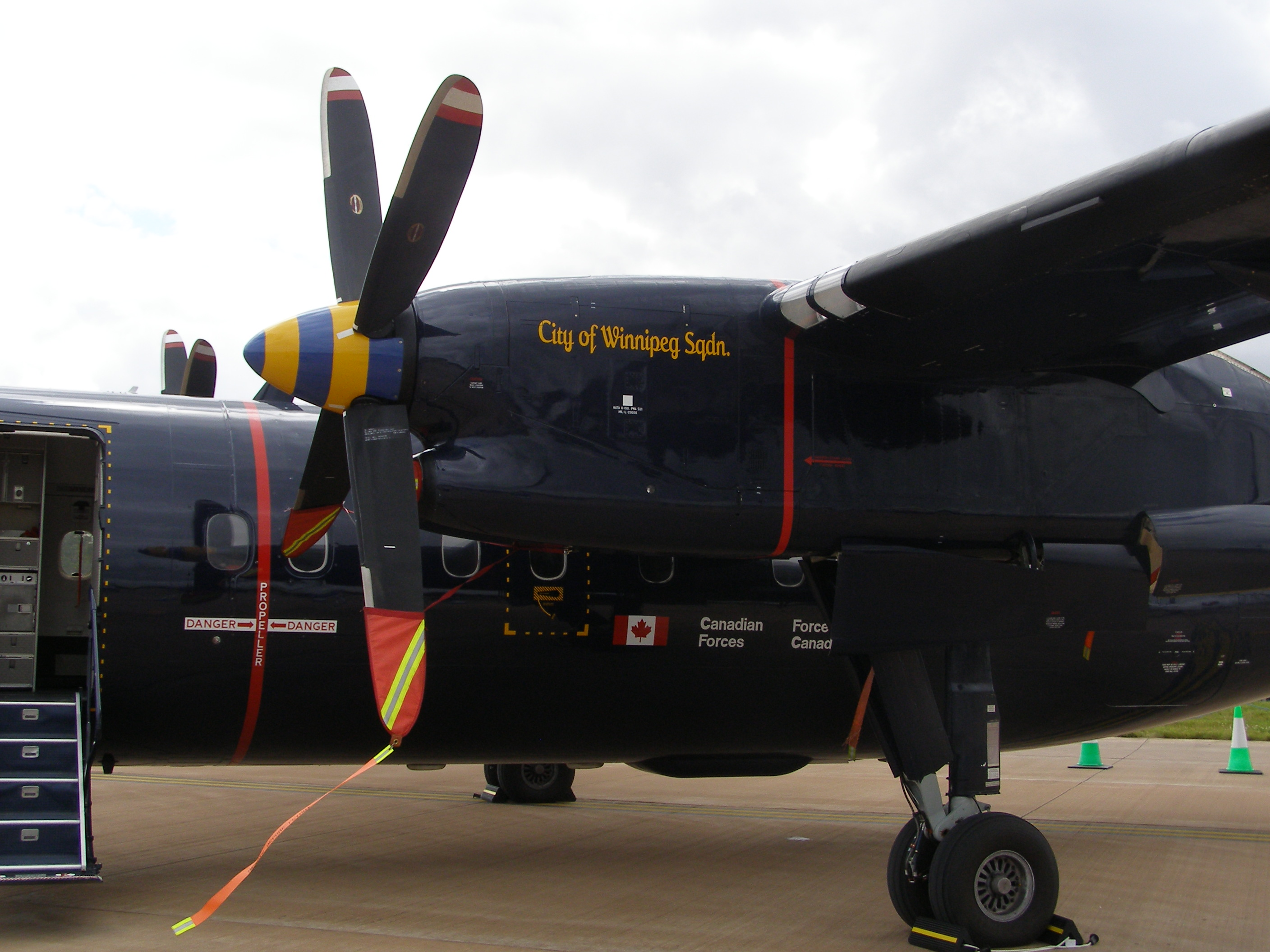
A PW120A fitted to a Canadian Forces CT-142

Application	Variant
Antonov An-132D	PW150A
Antonov An-140	PW127A
ATR 42-300/320/400	PW120/PW121
ATR 42-500/600/600S	PW127E/XT-M/XT-L
ATR 72-100/200	PW124B
ATR 72-500/600	PW127F/XT-M
BAe ATP	PW126
Canadair CL-215T	PW123AF
Canadair CL-415	PW123AF
De Havilland Canada Dash 8-100	PW120/PW121
De Havilland Canada Dash 8-200/300	PW123
De Havilland Canada Dash 8-400	PW150
Dornier 328	PW119
EADS CASA C-295	PW127G
Embraer EMB 120 Brasilia	PW118/118A/118B
Fokker 50/60	PW125B/127B
Ilyushin Il-114	PW127H
Xian MA60	PW127J
Xian Y-7-200A	PW127C

=== Other applications ===
- Bombardier JetTrain
- Skjold-class corvette

== Specifications ==
PW100/150 Series
Series	Thermo. Power	Mech. Power	Prop. max. RPM	BSFC (Note: At sea-level take-off)	Dry weight	Height	Width	Length	Application
PW118	2,180 hp 1,630 kW	1,800 hp 1,300 kW	1,300	0.498 lb/(hp⋅h); 303 g/kWh	861 lb 391 kg	31 in 79 cm	25 in 64 cm	81 in 210 cm	Embraer EMB-120
PW120	2,400 hp 1,800 kW	2,100 hp 1,600 kW	1,200	0.485 lb/(hp⋅h); 295 g/kWh	921 lb 418 kg	31 in 79 cm	25 in 64 cm	84 in 210 cm	ATR 42-300/320; Dash 8-100
PW123/124	3,000 hp 2,200 kW	2,400 hp 1,800 kW	1,200	0.470 lb/(hp⋅h); 286 g/kWh	992 lb 450 kg	33 in 84 cm	26 in 66 cm	84 in 210 cm	Dash 8-200/300; Canadair CL-215T/CL-415
PW127	3,200 hp 2,400 kW	2,750 hp 2,050 kW	1,200	0.459 lb/(hp⋅h); 279 g/kWh	1,060 lb 480 kg	33 in 84 cm	26 in 66 cm	84 in 210 cm	An-140, ATR 42-400/500/600, ATR 72-210/500/600; CASA C-295, Il-114-100, Xian MA60
PW150	6,200 hp 4,600 kW	5,000 hp 3,700 kW	1,020	0.433 lb/(hp⋅h); 263 g/kWh	1,583 lb 718 kg	44 in 110 cm	30 in 76 cm	95 in 240 cm	Dash 8-400

Data from PW100, PW150

==== General characteristics ====
- Type: Three-shaft turboprop
- Length: 2,046–2,130 mm (80.6–83.9 in); PW150: 2,420 mm (95 in)
- Diameter: 635–679 mm (25.0–26.7 in); PW150: 790 mm (31 in)
- Dry weight: 390.5–481.7 kg (861–1,062 lb); PW150: 716.9 kg (1,580 lb)

==== Components ====
- Compressor: Two-spool, single-stage centrifugal LP + single-stage centrifugal HP

PW150: Two-spool, three-stage axial LP + single-stage centrifugal HP

- Combustors: Reverse flow combustor
- Turbine: Single-stage HP and LP turbines, two-stage power turbine
- Fuel type: PW150: Kerosene Jet A, A-1/JP8; Wide Cut Jet B/JP4; High Flash JP5/JP1
- Oil system: Self-contained system

==== Performance ====
- Maximum power output: 1,342–1,846 kW (1,800–2,476 hp); PW150: 3,415 kW (4,580 hp) + 3.412 kN (767 lbf)
- Overall pressure ratio: PW120, PW127, and PW150: 12.14, 15.77, and 17.97
- Air mass flow: PW120, PW127, and PW150: 6.70, 8.49, and 14.44 kg/s (14.8, 18.7, and 31.8 lb/s)
- Power-to-weight ratio: 3.44–3.83 kW/kg (2.09–2.33 hp/lb); PW150: 4.76 kW/kg (2.90 hp/lb)

== See also ==
Comparable engines

- Allison AE2100
- General Electric CT7
- General Electric GE38
- Klimov TV7-117

Related lists

- List of aircraft engines

== Bibliography ==
- "Pratt & Whitney Canada PW100 Series" (PDF). Forecast International. November 2010.
- Leyes II, Richard A.; Fleming, William A. (1999). The History of North American Small Gas Turbine Aircraft Engines. Washington, DC: Smithsonian Institution. ISBN 1-56347-332-1. OCLC 247550535.
