= Rhein-Neckar Air =

German airline without own aircraft

- Founded: 2013; 13 years ago
- Commenced operations: March 2014
- Ceased operations: 31 December 2024
- Operating bases: Mannheim City Airport
- Fleet size: 1
- Destinations: 6
- Headquarters: Mannheim, Germany
- Key people: Axel Reißmann
- Website: flyrna.com

Rhein-Neckar Air GmbH, commonly known as RNA, was a German virtual airline that offered regional scheduled and charter flights out of Mannheim City Airport with all flights being operated by MHS Aviation. It ceased operations in December 2024.

== History ==
=== Foundation ===
After Cirrus Airlines ceased operations in 2012, Mannheim City Airport was left without any scheduled airline service. Although well connected to Frankfurt Airport, the local economy demanded the re-establishment of direct flight connections from the Rhine-Neckar Metropolitan Region to other German cities. Rhein-Neckar Air was consequently founded as a LLC with the support of local companies such as SAP, Heidelberg Cement and Südzucker. Operations commenced on 10 March 2014, offering weekday flights between Mannheim City Airport and Berlin Tegel Airport. After a successful start, flights to Hamburg began later that year.

=== Later developments ===
Since 2016 RNA served the island of Sylt during the summer season, flights which were also offered from Münster/Osnabrück in 2016 and from Nuremberg in 2017; however both routes since ceased. The network had since been seasonally expanded with flights to Usedom which was also served from Kassel as of 2022. According to the company, 35,000 passengers used its service per year as of 2017, a figure that decreased to 22,000 by 2022.

In April 2023, RNA announced it would not resume its sole remaining year-round scheduled service to Hamburg, which it had suspended in 2020 in the wake of the COVID-19 pandemic, due to insufficient booking numbers.

In November 2024, RNA filed for insolvency while maintaining operations for the time being. Shortly after, it announced plans to change its brand to Mannheim City Airlines for the planned resumption of its seasonal services in 2025. The airline subsequently announced the cessation of all operations on 31 December 2024.

== Destinations ==
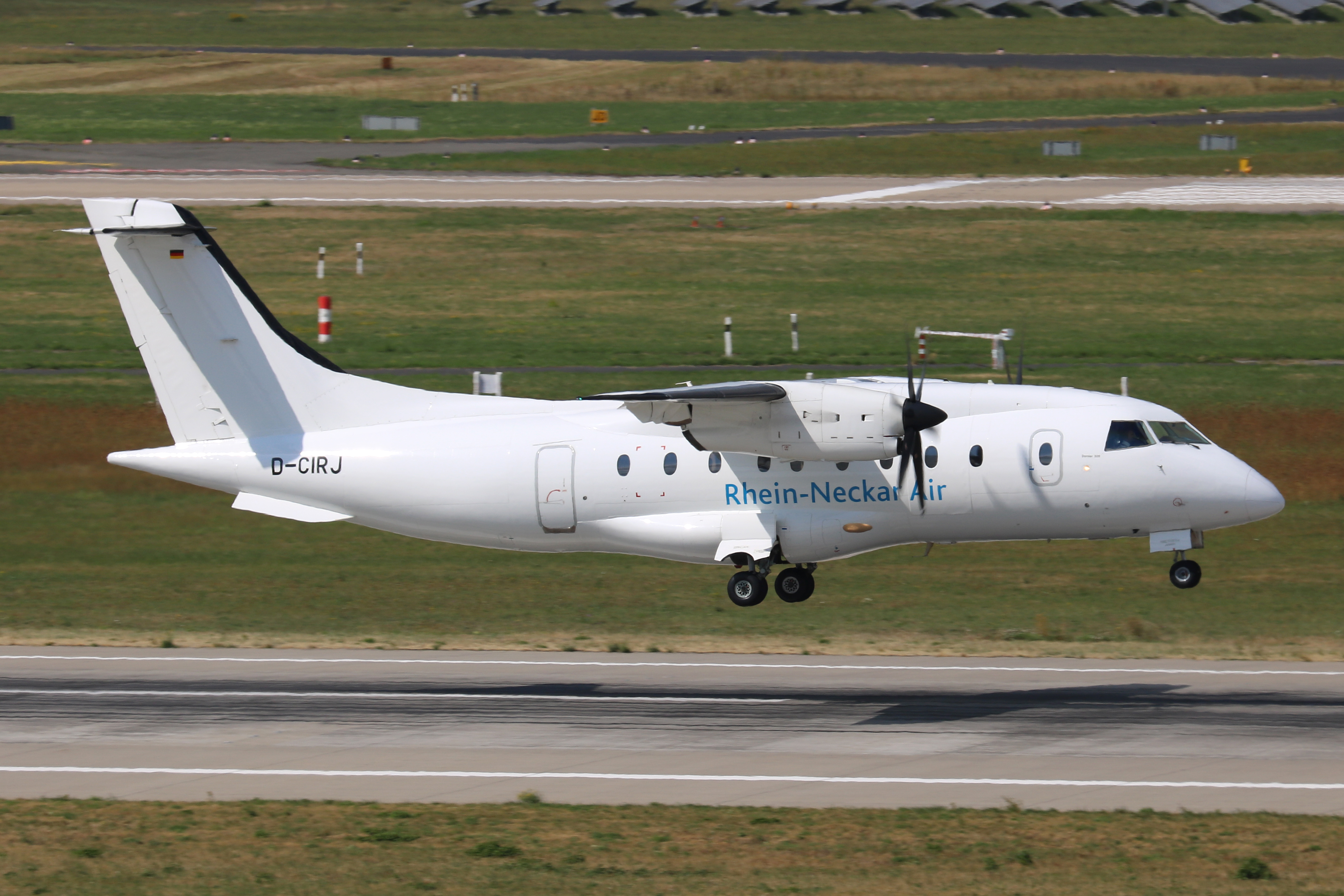
A Rhein-Neckar Air Dornier 328-110 operated by MHS Aviation.

=== Current destinations ===
As of November 2024, Rhein-Neckar Air served the following scheduled and charter destinations:

- Elba - Marina di Campo Airport seasonal charter
- Friedrichshafen - Friedrichshafen Airport seasonal charter
- Kassel - Kassel Airport seasonal charter
- Mannheim - Mannheim City Airport base
- Sylt - Sylt Airport seasonal
- Usedom - Heringsdorf Airport seasonal

RNA also operated non-public charter flights, including several local top division sports clubs, such as Adler Mannheim and TSG 1899 Hoffenheim.

=== Former destinations ===
RNA formerly also served the following destinations which ceased ahead of the company's shutdown:

- Berlin - Berlin Tegel Airport
- Hamburg - Hamburg Airport
- Münster/Osnabrück - Münster Osnabrück Airport seasonal
- Nuremberg - Nuremberg Airport seasonal

== Fleet ==
As of November 2024, MHS Aviation operated the following aircraft for Rhein-Neckar Air:

Aircraft	In service	Orders	Passengers
Dornier 328-110	1	—	33
Total	1	—	
