= Private Wings =

German airline

IATA	ICAO	Call sign
JW	PWF	PRIVATE WINGS
- Founded: 1991
- Hubs: Berlin Brandenburg Airport
- Fleet size: 10
- Destinations: charter
- Headquarters: Schönefeld, Germany
- Key people: Peter Gatz; Andreas Wagner
- Website: privatewings.aero

Private Wings Flugcharter GmbH is a German charter airline that was founded in 1991 and operates chartered corporate, cargo and air ambulance services out of Berlin Brandenburg Airport. Its head office is located in the General Aviation Terminal (Allgemeine Luftfahrt) on the property of Berlin Brandenburg Airport in Schönefeld, Brandenburg.

== Fleet ==
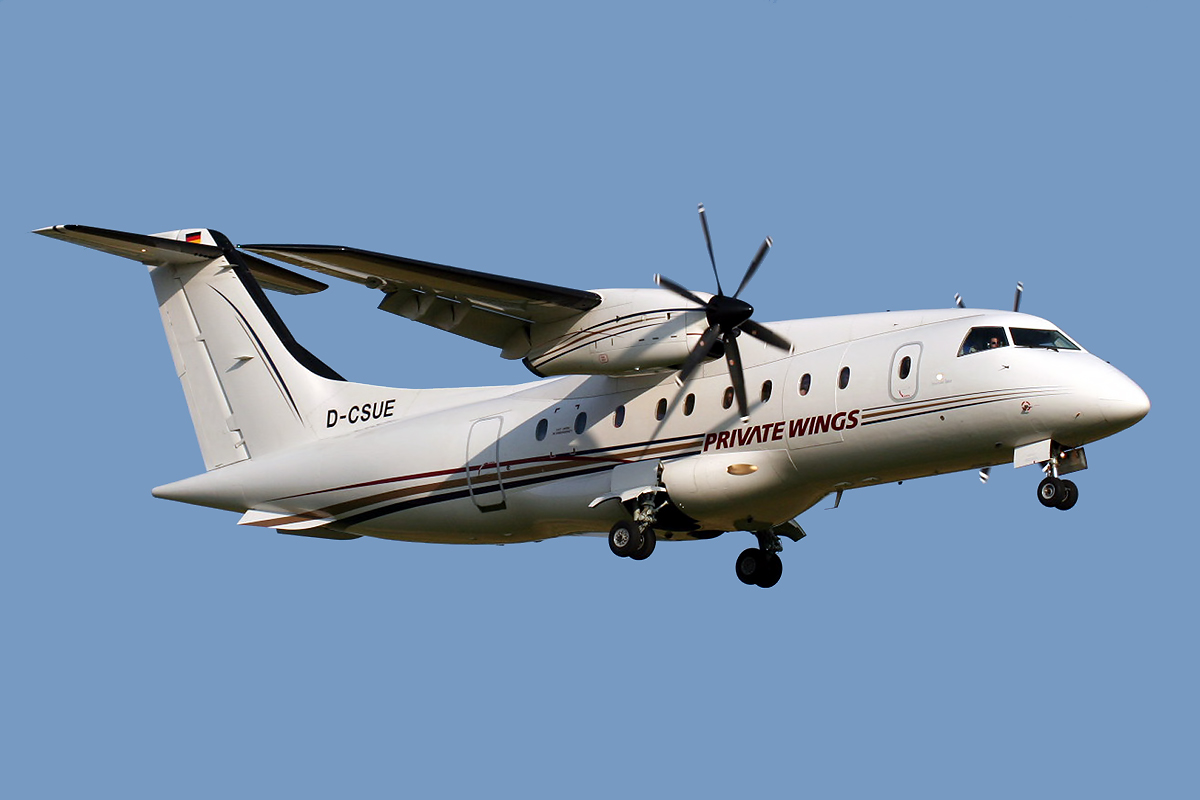
Private Wings Dornier 328-100

=== Current fleet ===
As of July 2026, Private Wings operates the following aircraft:

Private Wings fleet
Aircraft	In service	Passengers
Beechcraft 1900D	1	19
Dornier 328	9	32
Total	10	

=== Fleet development ===
Private Wings is the largest remaining civil operator of the Dornier 328. In May 2023, Dornier successor Deutsche Aircraft announced Private Wings as the launch customer of the updated D328eco model, with 5 aircraft on order.

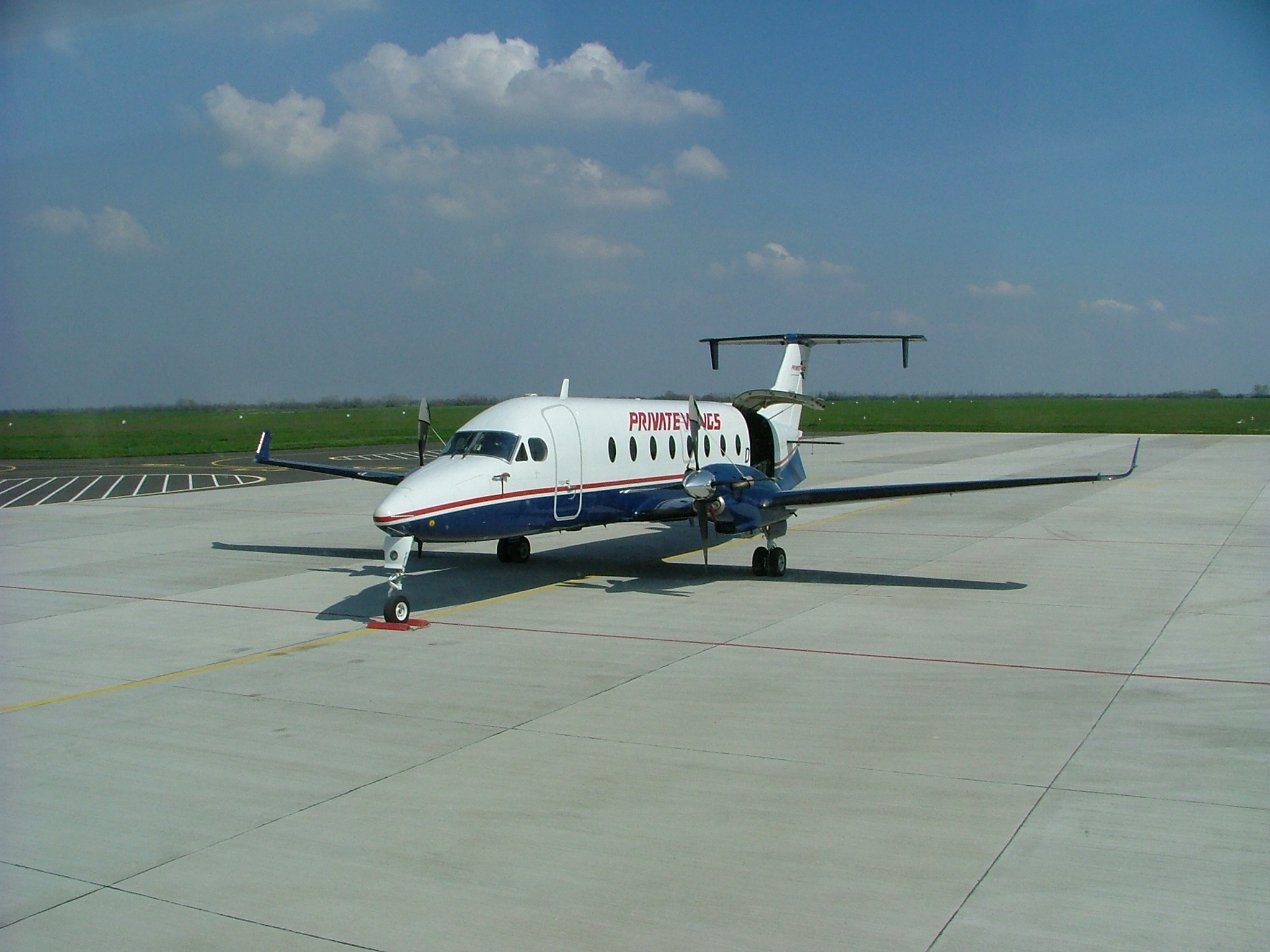
Private Wings Beechcraft 1900D

=== Former fleet ===
As of August 2025, Private Wings operated 1 Beech 1900D and 9 Dornier 328

== Accidents and incidents ==
- On 19 February 1996 at 09:54 local time, a Private Wings Cessna Citation II (registered D-CASH) crashed near Freilassing, Germany, killing the two pilots and eight passengers on board. The aircraft was on an executive flight from Berlin Tempelhof Airport to Salzburg Airport and the pilots had already begun the final approach, when severe icing conditions were encountered, leading to a stall and subsequent crash of the aircraft into a forest 3 nmi (5.6 km) short of the runway. The accident investigation concluded that there was also a short circuit in the aircraft's electrical systems, which might have contributed to the crash.
