= MHS Aviation (Germany) =

German charter airline

IATA	ICAO	Call sign
M2	MHV	SNOWCAP
- Founded: 1977; 49 years ago
- AOC #: D-304
- Operating bases: Munich Airport
- Fleet size: 9
- Headquarters: Oberhaching, Germany
- Key people: Steffen Fries
- Employees: 120
- Website: www.mhs-aviation.de

MHS Aviation GmbH was a German charter airline headquartered in Oberhaching, Bavaria. MHS Aviation is based at nearby Munich Airport, Special Airport Oberpfaffenhofen as well as Mannheim City Airport. The company specializes in aircraft charter, aircraft management, aircraft lease and VIP service. It currently operates a fleet of 14 charter aircraft. The majority of the fleet consists of business aircraft. In addition, one Dornier 328 aircraft was operated for the now defunct Rhein-Neckar Air on a scheduled domestic service.

== History ==
The company was founded as Munich Helicopter Service (MHS) in 1977.

After the purchase of the airline by the entrepreneur Gerhard Brandecker in 2009, the airline put a focus on adding business jets to its fleet. MHS Aviation has been in business for more than 40 years and has developed into one of the largest executive charter operators in Germany. In October 2019 MHS Aviation took delivery of Europe's first Embraer Praetor 600.

German virtual airline Rhein-Neckar Air, for which MHS Aviation operated all flights, announced it would cease all operations on 31 December 2024.

== Services ==
MHS Aviation specializes in aircraft charter, aircraft lease and fleet management. It currently operates several business jets of different sizes.

== Destinations ==
MHS Aviation performs both passenger and cargo charter flights. It operates international charter flights as well domestic scheduled services.

== Fleet ==
=== Current fleet ===
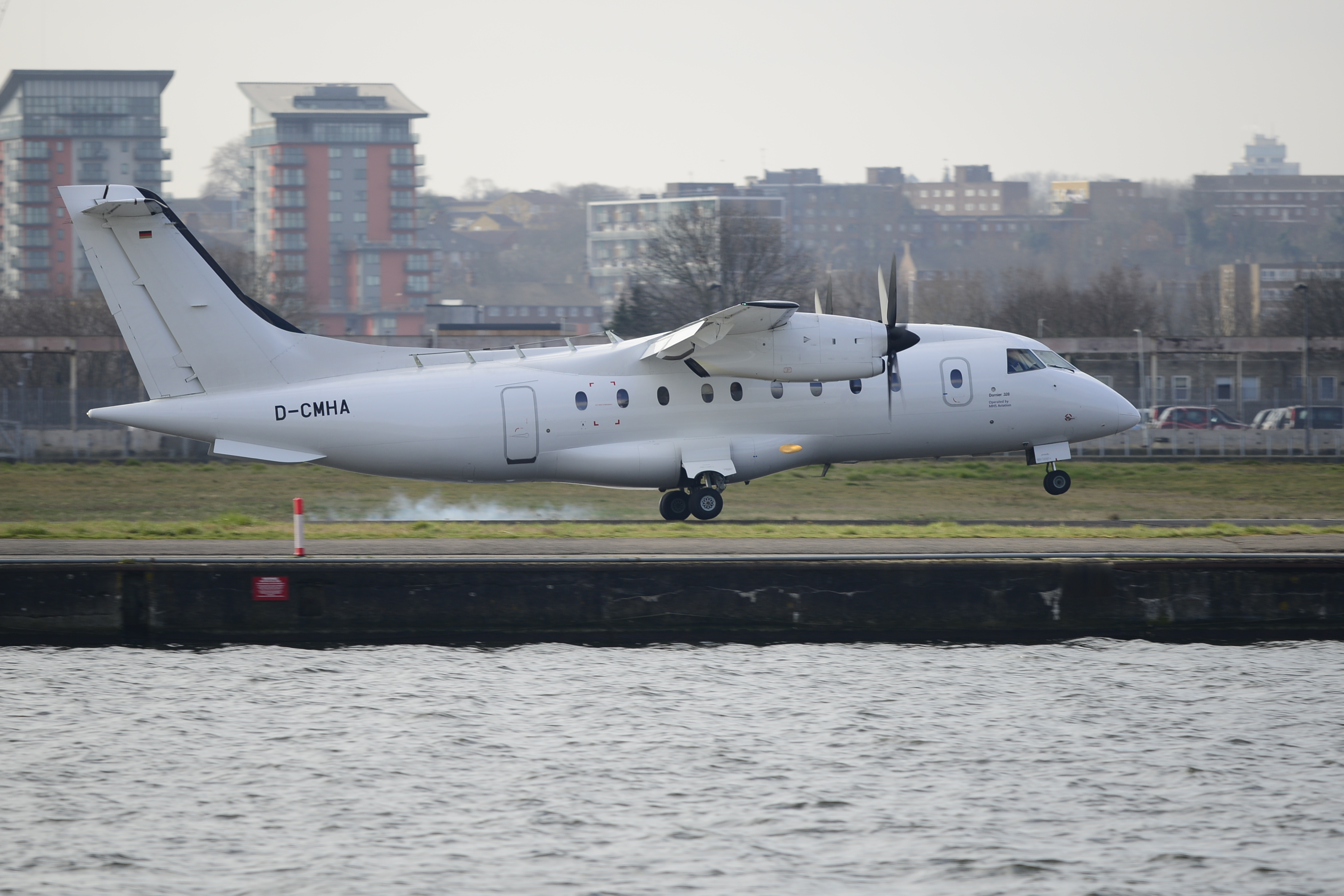
MHS Aviation Dornier 328-100

As of November 2019, the MHS Aviation fleet consists of the following aircraft. Currently the fleet consists of 18 aircraft ranging from ultra-long range to turbo prop aircraft. Since June 2017 MHS Aviation operates two Dassault Falcon 2000LX by the French aircraft manufacturer Dassault Aviation.

Aircraft	In service	Notes	Seats
Bombardier Challenger 604	1	One written off	10/12
Dassault Falcon 2000LX	2		8
Embraer Praetor 600	1		12
Embraer Phenom 300	1		8
Dornier 328-110	3(as of August 2025)		32
Dornier 328JET	1(as of August 2025)		
Total	9		

=== Former fleet ===
The airline previously operated the following aircraft (at November 2019):

- 1 Gulfstream G-650
- 1 Gulfstream G-550
- 1 Learjet 60
- 1 Dornier 328

== Accidents ==
In January 7, 2017, A Bombardier Challenger 604 had wake turbulence from an Airbus A380 causing the aircraft to lose control, seven to have injuries including one serious Injury were reported. The aircraft landed safely in Muscat, but the aircraft was written off.

== See also ==
- Air transport in Germany
- List of airlines of Germany
