= Heringsdorf Airport =

Heringsdorf Airport Flughafen Heringsdorf

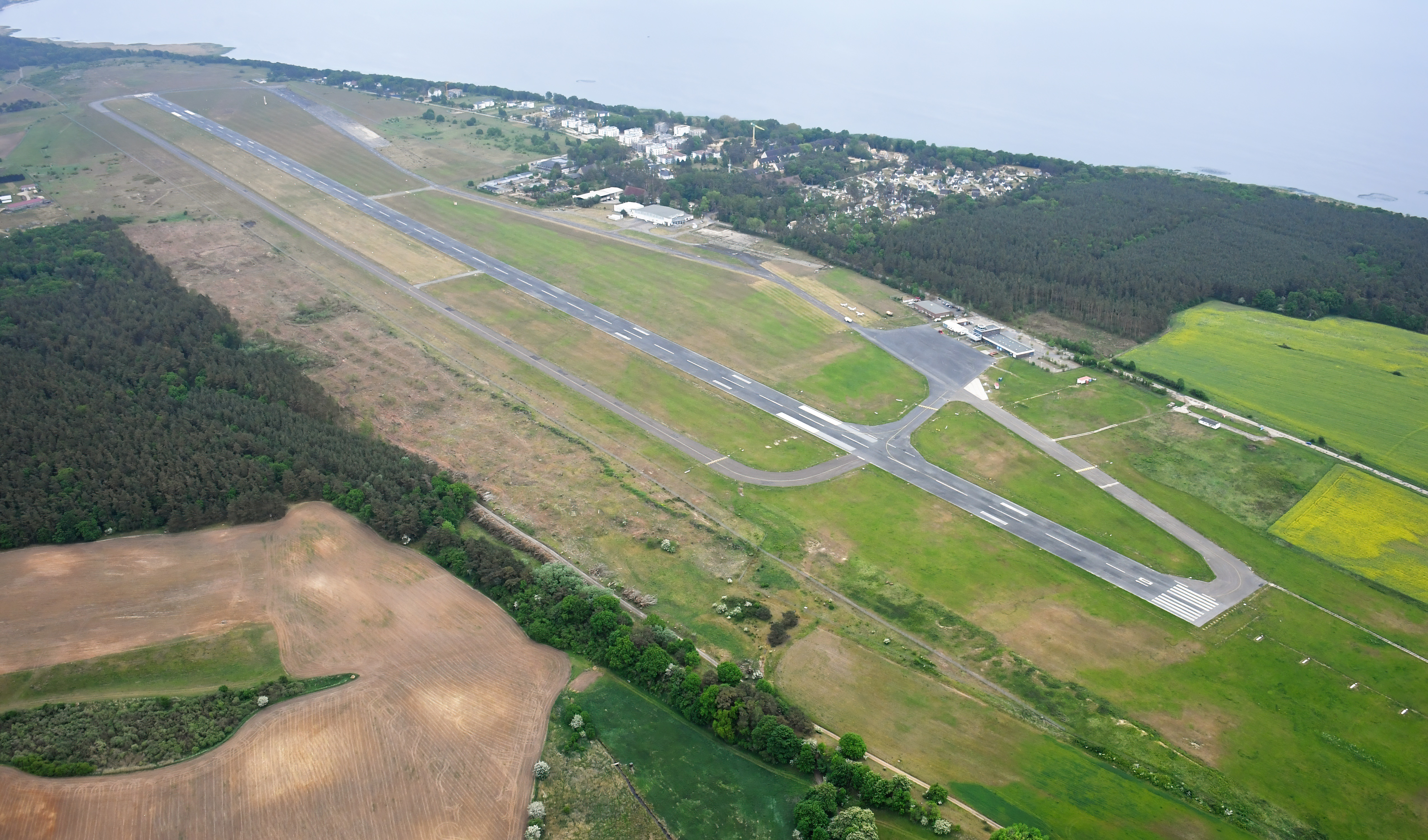
- IATA: HDF; ICAO: EDAH

Summary
- Airport type: Public
- Operator: Flughafen Heringsdorf GmbH
- Serves: Usedom
- Location: Garz, Germany
- Elevation AMSL: 94 ft (29 m)
- Coordinates: 53°52′43″N 014°09′08″E
- Website: flughafen-heringsdorf.de

Map
- Location of the airport in Mecklenburg-Vorpommern HDF (Germany)

Runways
Direction	Length		Surface
Direction	ft	m	Surface
10/28	7,562	2,305	Asphalt
10R/28L	1,969	600	Grass
- Source: DAFIF, AIP at German air traffic control.

Heringsdorf Airport (German: Flughafen Heringsdorf) (IATA: HDF, ICAO: EDAH) is a regional airport located near Garz on the island of Usedom in Germany. It used to be an East German airbase and today features summer leisure routes from cities in Germany and Switzerland as well as general aviation.

The airport takes its name from the nearby municipality of Heringsdorf, located some 10 kilometres (6.2 mi) to the north. The largest town on the island however is Świnoujście in Poland, immediately to the east of the airport.

== Facilities ==
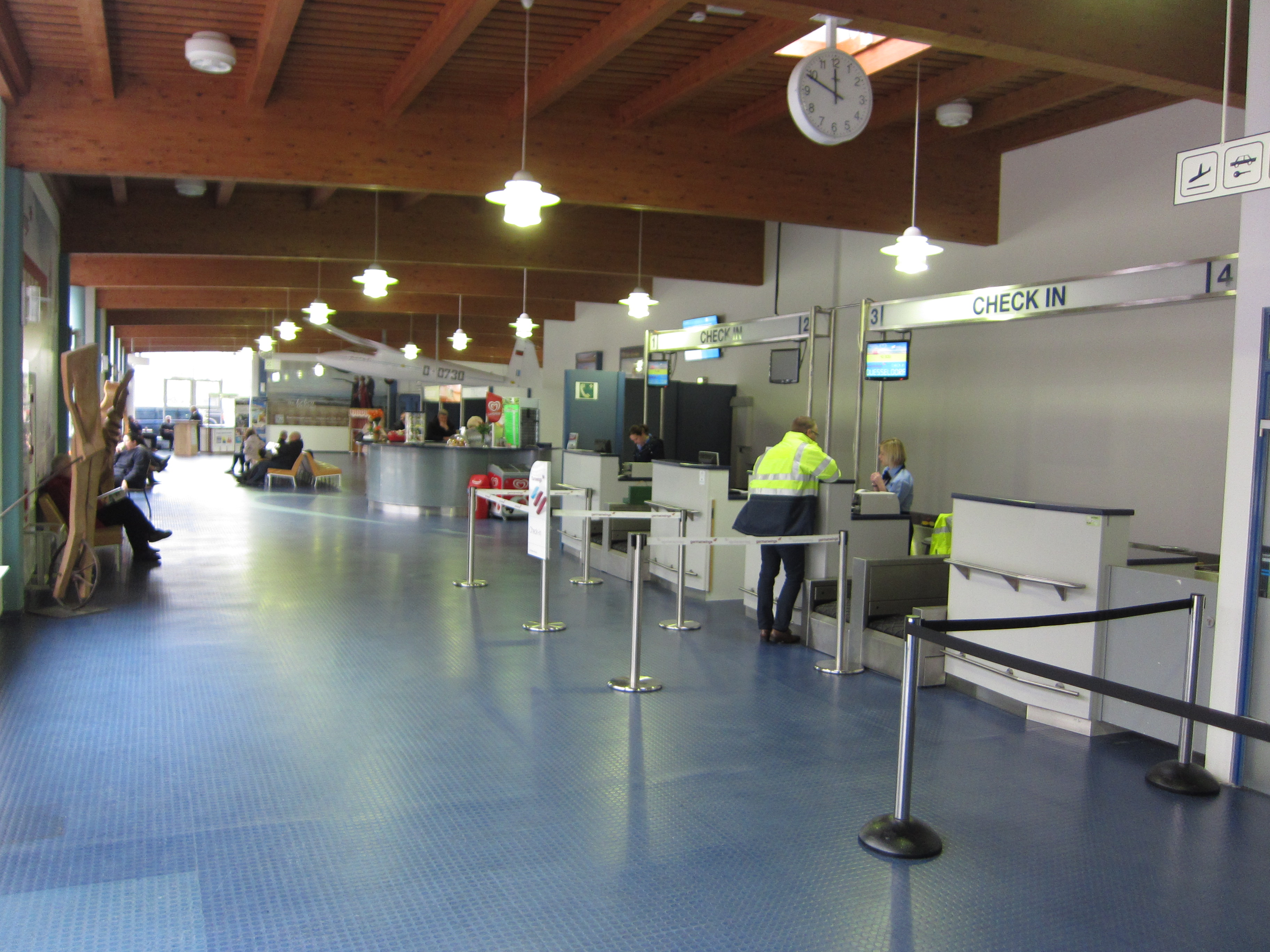
Check-in area

Heringsdorf Airport features a single small terminal building equipped with check-in facilities and an information desk. The apron features one stand for mid-sized-aircraft, such as the Airbus A319, and several stands for smaller aircraft, such as the Cessna 172. By winter 2015, the airport was equipped with renewed firefighting and security facilities as well as a refurbished check-in area.

== Airlines and destinations ==
The following airlines currently operate seasonal flights at Heringsdorf Airport:

Airlines	Destinations
Lufthansa	Seasonal: Frankfurt
Luxair	Seasonal: Luxembourg
Mannheim City Air	Seasonal: Mannheim
MHS Aviation	Seasonal: Friedrichshafen, Kassel
Swiss International Air Lines	Seasonal: Zurich

The nearest major international airport is Berlin, approx. 200 kilometres (120 mi) to the south.

== Ground transport ==
Usedomer Bäderbahn busline 286 runs from Heringsdorf to the airport from Monday to Friday; there is no direct public transport connection to Świnoujście. Rental cars and taxis are also available.

== See also ==
- List of airports in Germany
- Transport in Germany
