= Garz (Usedom) =

- Municipality
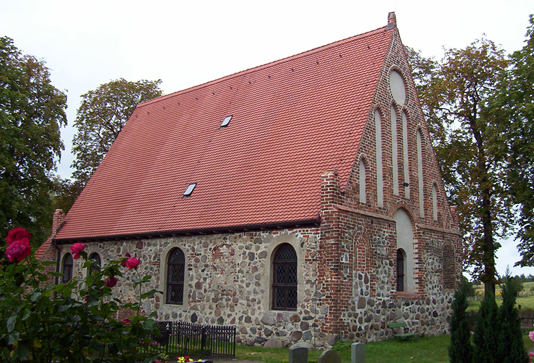
- Old church (Saalkirche) in Garz

- Location of Garz within Vorpommern-Greifswald district
- Interactive map of Garz
- Location within Germany Location within Mecklenburg-Vorpommern
- Coordinates: 53°53′N 14°10′E
- Country: Germany
- State: Mecklenburg-Vorpommern
- District: Vorpommern-Greifswald
- Municipal assoc.: Usedom-Süd

Government
  - Mayor: Günter Krohn

Area
  - Total: 10.11 km^{2} (3.90 sq mi)
- Elevation: 21 m (69 ft)

Population (2025-12-31)
  - Total: 243
  - Density: 24.0/km^{2} (62.3/sq mi)
- Time zone: UTC+01:00 (CET)
  - Summer (DST): UTC+02:00 (CEST)
- Postal codes: 17419
- Dialling codes: 038376
- Vehicle registration: VG
- Website: www.amtusedom.de

Garz (German pronunciation: [ˈɡaʁts]) is a small municipality on the island of Usedom in the Vorpommern-Greifswald landkreis in the state of Mecklenburg-Vorpommern, Germany.

Adjacent to the town is the regional Heringsdorf Airport, before border controls between Poland and Germany were abolished in 2007 in accordance with the Schengen agreement. A border checkpoint with Świnoujście that was restricted to pedestrian/bicycle/bus traffic existed briefly.
