= Deutsche Aircraft =

German aircraft manufacturing company

- Type: Aircraft manufacturer
- Founded: 2020; 6 years ago
- Headquarters: Oberpfaffenhofen, Germany
- Key people: Nico Neumann (CEO)
- Products: D328eco
- Number of employees: 450 (2023); 550 (2024); 600 (2025)
- Parent: Sierra Nevada Corporation
- Website: https://www.deutscheaircraft.com/

Deutsche Aircraft GmbH is a German aircraft manufacturer based in the village of Oberpfaffenhofen, Germany.

== History ==
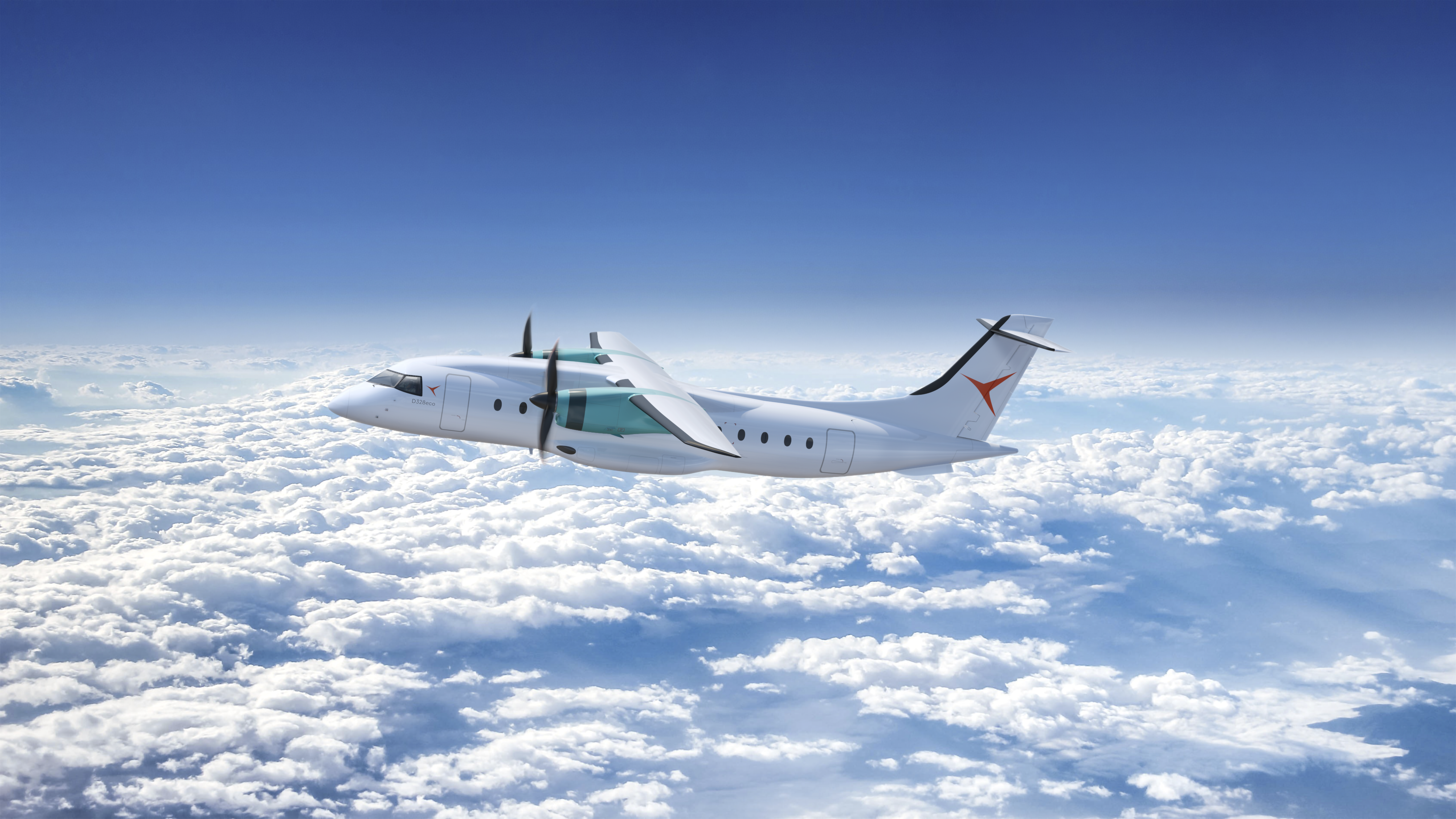
Render of D328eco

The Dornier 328 program began in the mid-1980s, with the turboprop entering commercial service in October 1993. The concept for the aircraft evolved over the years under the Daimler-Benz group, Fairchild Dornier and AvCraft Aviation.

In 2006, 328 Support Services GmbH (328SSG) was founded and took over the Type Certificate (TC) rights for the Dornier 328 (D328). In February 2015, it was acquired by US aerospace and engineering company Sierra Nevada Corporation (SNC).

Deutsche Aircraft began operations as an original equipment manufacturer (OEM) on 7 December 2020, with the support of its parent company, SNC. The headquarters of Deutsche Aircraft is at Oberpfaffenhofen Airport, near Munich.

The company employs over 600 people representing more than 45 nationalities. Deutsche Aircraft describes its focus as sustainable regional aviation.

== Operations ==
As the major supplier of parts for the Dornier 328 series, Deutsche Aircraft's Global Support Centre in Oberpfaffenhofen provides technical and engineering support for the in-service fleet of D328 aircraft.

== Products ==
Model name	First flight	Number built	Type
D328eco	TBA	0	Twin turboprop regional airliner

=== D328eco ===
The D328eco is a double-engine turboprop, designed to be an elongated version of the Do328. It was scheduled to enter into service in 2026 which has been pushed back to late 2027, supposedly due to new certification requirements. It is designed to run fully on H2-SAF sustainable fuel, and will have a maximum cruising speed of 324 knots.

To develop the D328eco, Deutsche Aircraft collaborated with a number of suppliers within the global aviation sector, including Pratt & Whitney Canada, Garmin, Liebherr-Aerospace Toulouse, Aciturri, Heggemann, Triumph Group, Rasakti, Test-Fuchs and Akaer.

The D328eco will be built at the new final assembly line at Leipzig/Halle Airport. The 62,000 m^{2} facility will have a production capacity of 48 D328eco aircraft per year, including a production hall, a hangar for aircraft delivery, a logistics centre and an administration building.

The ground-breaking ceremony for the final assembly line took place in May 2023, and Deutsche Aircraft announced Private Wings as the launch customer for the D328eco, with an initial purchase of five aircraft.

On 28 May 2025, TAC 1, the first test aircraft of the D328eco, was rolled out in Oberpfaffenhofen. This represented a significant step towards type certification and the aircraft’s entry into service.

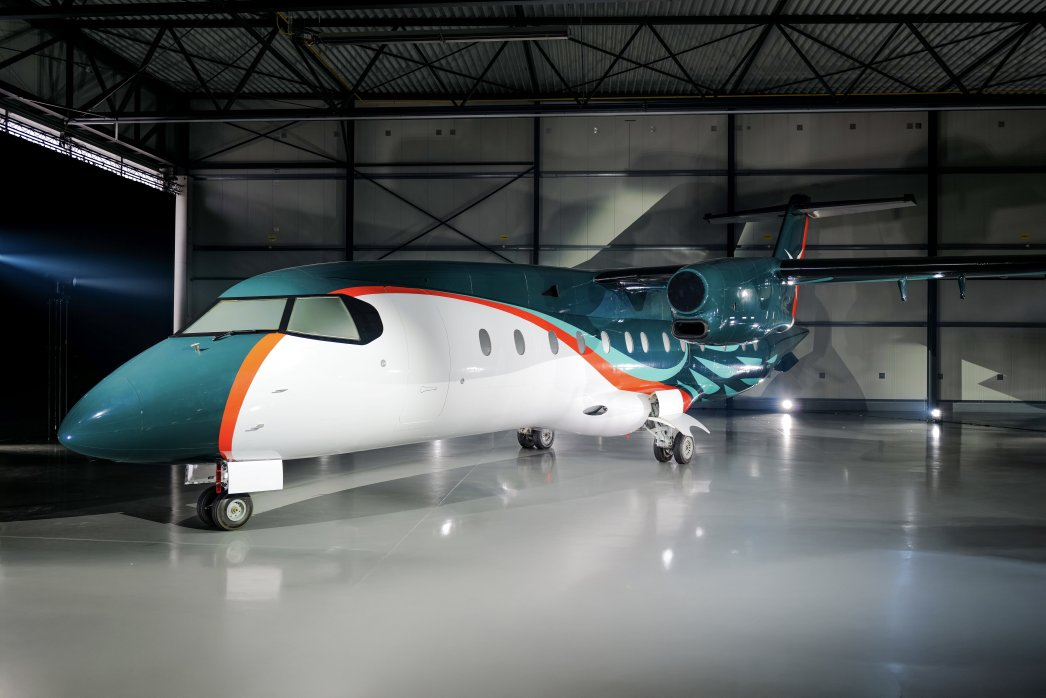
The first D328eco test aircraft was officially rolled out in May 2025.

== Research and development ==
Many of Deutsche Aircraft's research projects investigating future flight technologies and emerging energy sources are part of the LuFo Klima Civil Aviation Research Programme, co-funded by the German Federal Ministry for Economic Affairs and Climate Protection (BMWK) and developed in conjunction with research and government institutions such as the German Aerospace Center (DLR) and the German Aerospace Industries Association (BDLI).

=== D328 UPLIFT ===
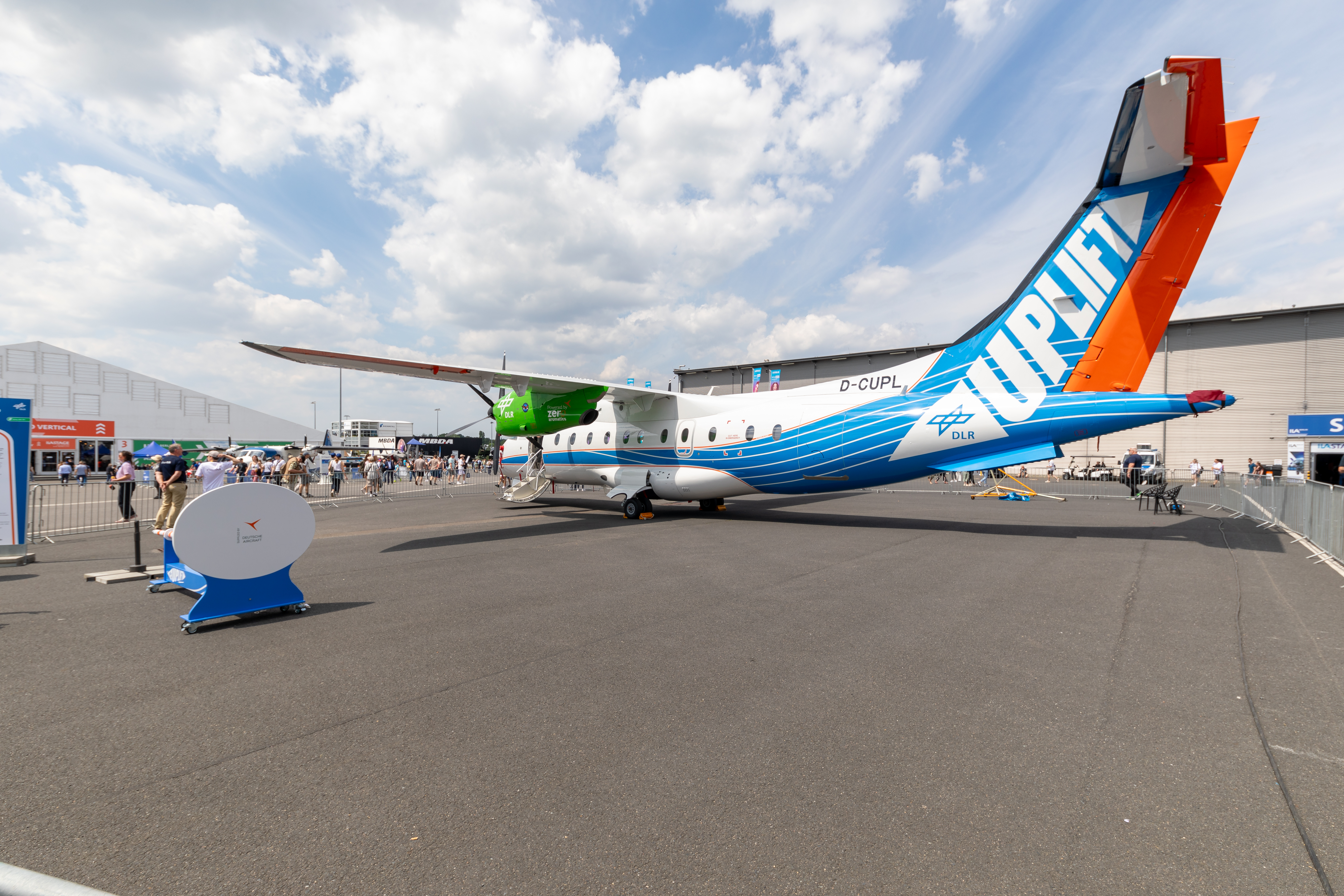
Do328-100 Uplift

Together with the German Aerospace Center (Deutsches Zentrum für Luft- und Raumfahrt; DLR) and Deutsche Aircraft are conducting the world's first measurement flights in the tailwind of a turboprop aircraft powered by 100 percent synthetic, aromatics-free fuel with the objective to reduce not only the carbon footprint of aviation, but also the particulate emissions and climate-impacting condensation trails – contrails – thus paving the way for climate-compatible aviation.

As a platform of choice, Deutsche Aircraft will provide to DLR a research aircraft will be used as a flying test bed for environmentally friendly aviation technologies, for example for fully synthetic fuels or hydrogen as possible sustainable aviation fuels of the future. The flying DLR test laboratory is to be used by national industry, but also by small and medium-sized enterprises and start-ups as well as research institutions, to test new, environmentally friendly system, fuel and propulsion technologies under real conditions and to significantly accelerate their practical application in aviation.

Previous flight tests conducted by DLR in collaboration with NASA and Airbus have already shown that the use of sustainable biofuel leads to a reduction in soot particles, ice crystals and global warming caused by contrails. The CLIM0ART project (Climate Impact-driven Emission and Contrail Measurements of 0 Aromatic fuels in Regional Turboprop Aircraft) is now investigating whether similar effects can be achieved with synthetic aromatics-free fuels.

=== D328ALPHA ===
The D328ALPHA is a one-off modification to an existing D328 airframe and the objective of the programme is to evaluate, develop and flight-test technologies that will reduce aviation emissions, such as electric propulsion, fuel cells and liquid hydrogen storage.

== See also ==
- Dornier Flugzeugwerke
- Dornier 328
