= Dornier 328 =

Regional airliner family by Dornier

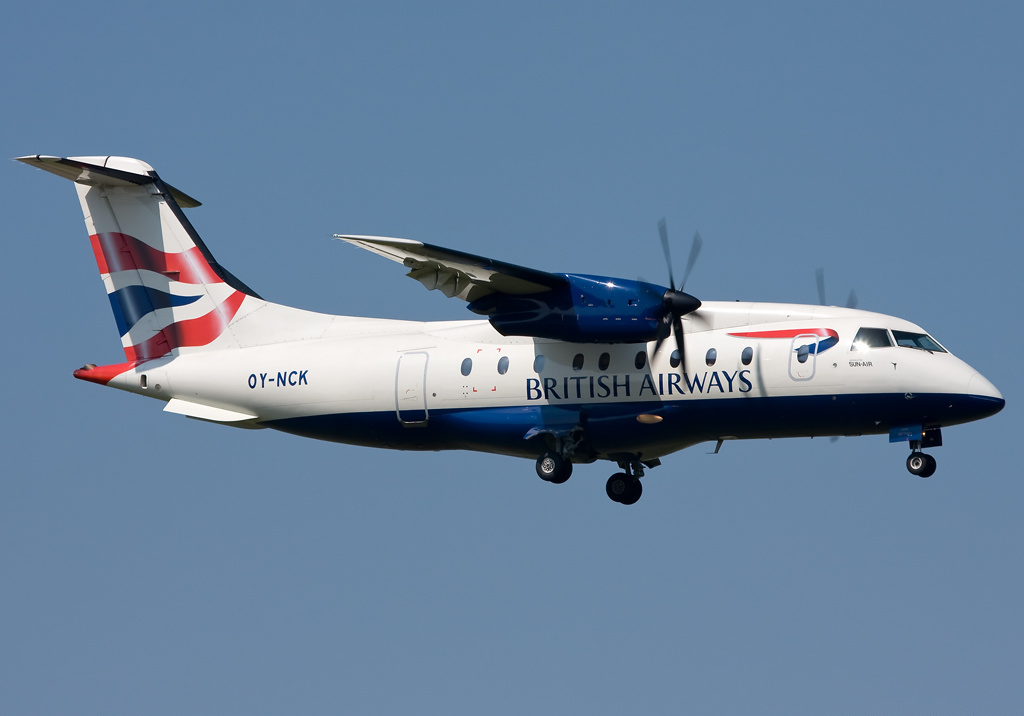
- A Dornier 328 of Sun-Air of Scandinavia, painted in British Airways livery

General information
- Type: Airliner
- National origin: Germany
- Manufacturer: Dornier, Fairchild Dornier; Sierra Nevada Corporation; Deutsche Aircraft
- Status: In service
- Primary users: Central Mountain Air Rhein-Neckar Air; Eagle Air (Iceland)
- Number built: 107

History
- Manufactured: 1991–2000
- Introduction date: October 1993
- First flight: 6 December 1991
- Variant: Fairchild Dornier 328JET

The Dornier 328 is a turboprop-powered commuter airliner. Initially produced by German company Dornier Luftfahrt GmbH, the firm was acquired in 1996 by US firm Fairchild Aircraft. The resulting firm, named Fairchild Dornier, manufactured the Fairchild Dornier 328 family in Oberpfaffenhofen, Germany, conducted sales from San Antonio, Texas, United States, and supported the product line from both locations. A jet-powered version of the aircraft, the Fairchild Dornier 328JET, was also produced. While the Dornier name was later bought by Airbus Industries, the Dornier 328 type certificate (but not the Dornier brand name) has passed through a series of other investors, culminating with a company that, as of 2025, intended to roll out the prototype of an updated version under the name D328eco.

== Development ==
=== Origins ===
The Dornier 328 program started when Dornier was still owned by Deutsche Aerospace. Feedback from 1984 market research indicated a desire for a fast, quiet, and easy-to-maintain commuter airliner with a 30-seat capacity. Sales were projected to reach at least 400 units. Favorable features included a high cruising speed of 345 kn (639 km/h), and a higher cruising altitude and range, making the aircraft almost as fast as jet airliners while being more fuel-efficient. A trend away from spoke–and-hub distribution in favor of point-to-point transit was also viewed as being favorable to the 328.

In December 1988, the 328 project was relaunched following the granting of shareholder approval after negotiations between the Dornier family and Daimler Benz. As the result of a six-month evaluation, a selection of powerplants deemed to be appropriate for the 328 was formed, these being the General Electric CT7-9D, the Garrett TPE-341-21, and the Pratt & Whitney Canada PW119A. While the Garrett engine was viewed by Deutsche Aerospace as being technically superior, Pratt & Whitney's powerplant was more advanced in development, thus was chosen. The engine selection was soon followed by the selection of a six-bladed composite propeller from Hartzell, Hartzell's submission being reportedly substantially lighter than competing bids from Dowty and Hamilton Standard. Following various considerations between electromechanical and digital instrumentation, Dornier opted for a digital glass cockpit and selected Honeywell to provide this after considering options from Saab Group, Rockwell Collins, and Smiths Aerospace.

In May 1991, Horizon Air, a US-based airline, placed an order for 35 aircraft; this was the largest order for the 328 at that point and was larger than any other order for it or its competitors to be placed that year. In October 1991, the first prototype of the 328 was formally rolled out. On 6 December 1991, the first prototype conducted the type's maiden flight. On 4 June 1992, a second 328 prototype performed its first flight. On 14 December 1992, one of the 328 prototypes suffered a near-catastrophic in-flight propeller failure when all six propeller blades on one engine detached before puncturing the fuselage; the subsequent temporary loss of control caused the aircraft to roll 280° and descend 5,000 feet (1,500 m) before control was recovered.

On 13 October 1993, the 328 formally entered commercial service. The 328 was launched into the market during a period of large numbers of competing turboprop aircraft, as well as increasing competition from newly launched regional jets, which were becoming increasingly popular during the early 1990s. The 328 had the advantages of being both quieter and faster than many of its rivals, but this did not ensure its commercial success. The latter half of the 328 program took place during a recession, which curtailed demand for new aircraft from operators. Both the 328 and the wider Dornier division of Deutsche Aerospace proved to be losing money; accordingly, Deutsche Aerospace wavered in committing more resources to the regional aircraft market, repeatedly delaying a decision to proceed with a 48-seat stretched model of the 328, which had originally been unveiled in 1991.

=== Further development ===
During the early 1990s, Deutsche Aerospace and Fokker explored the prospects of a commercial relationship to mutually engage the regional aircraft market; this culminated in Deutsche Aerospace purchasing a 40% stake in Fokker in 1993. In June 1995, Deutsche Aerospace and Daewoo Heavy Industries were reportedly conducting talks on the establishment of a second 328 assembly line in South Korea for the Asian market. In 1995, both Fokker and Deutsche Aerospace suffered substantial financial difficulties, which ultimately led to the end of the latter's ambitions to dominate the European regional aircraft market. In June 1996, Deutsche Aerospace sold the majority of Dornier Luftfahrt GmbH to American manufacturer Fairchild Aircraft, leading to the creation of Fairchild Dornier GmbH. The newly combined Fairchild Dornier company emerged as the third-largest regional aircraft manufacturer in the world, and viewed the 328 as being both a key product in its lineup and the basis for a future family of aircraft.

Continuing development of a jet-powered variant of the 328 was initially designated as the Dornier 328-300 and later simply known as the Dornier 328JET, which had been started under Deutsche Aerospace. Fairchild Dornier also sought to develop a stretched version, designated as the Dornier 428JET, and a dedicated freighter model. Additionally, Farchild Dornier developed a larger aircraft, the Fairchild Dornier 728 family. In addition to typical passenger models, business jet configurations of both the 728JET and 928JET were projected, tentatively referred to as Envoy 3 and Envoy 7, respectively. The ambitious family project drew the support of the German government, which guaranteed US$350 million in loans for the scheme. During the late 1990s, Fairchild Dornier struggled to find both capital and strategic partners to support the project, and the company entered bankruptcy in April 2002.

=== Dornier aftermath ===
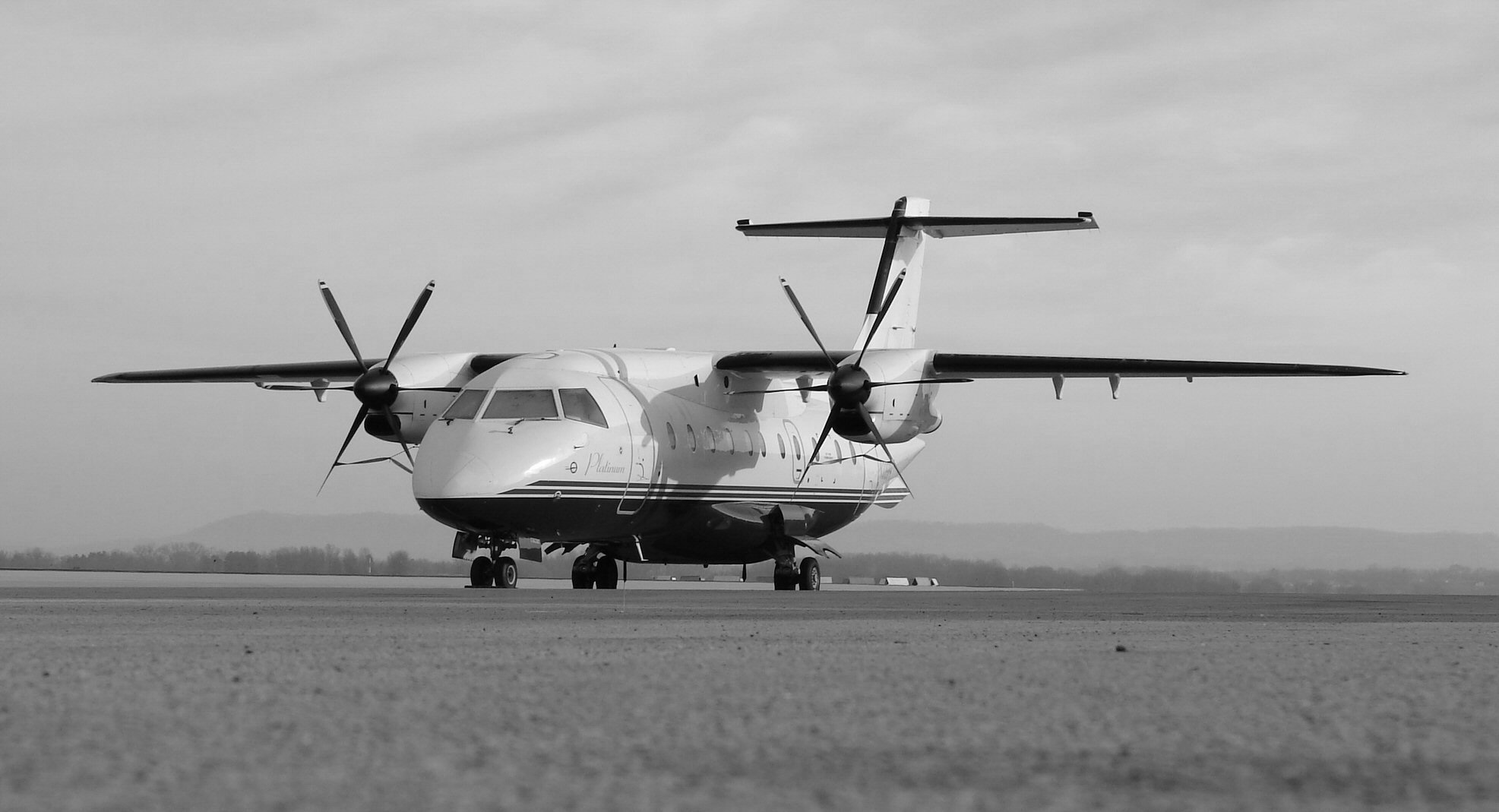
A Dornier 328, 2006

Following the bankruptcy of Fairchild Dornier, AvCraft Aviation acquired the Dornier 328/328JET rights, but this company entered bankruptcy less than three years later. In June 2006, 328 Support Services GmbH acquired the type certificate for the Dornier 328. It provides maintenance, repair, and overhaul services to the existing in-service fleet.

In February 2015, US engineering company Sierra Nevada Corporation acquired 328 Support Services GmbH. Shortly thereafter, Sierra Nevada's owner, Turkish-American engineer Fatih Ozmen established a private corporation named Özjet Havacılık Teknolojileri A.Ş. at Technopark of Bilkent University, Ankara, and signed a memorandum of understanding with the Transportation Ministry of Turkey to manufacture the 328 at Ankara. In June 2015, the Turkish government launched the Turkish TR328 and TRJ328 regional aircraft project, a modernized 328/328JET, with either turboprops or jets for civil and military use and a larger TR628/TRJ-628 forecasting a break-even level and market of 500–1000 for each type.

First flight was anticipated in 2019, but Turkey abandoned the program in October 2017, after facing increasing costs and no longer being confident of market demand forecasts.

Existing aircraft can be sourced by 328 Support Services and converted for civil transport, military operations, medical evacuation, or freighter or utility missions for $7–9 million, including zero time turboprops.

=== D328eco ===
On 21 August 2019, 328 Support Services announced the formation of DRA GmbH to establish its final assembly line for a new version of the aircraft, named 328NEU, at Leipzig/Halle Airport, creating of up to 250 new jobs there and over 100 jobs in Oberpfaffenhofen, near Munich; the programme should be detailed late in the first quarter of 2020. The company signed a memorandum of understanding with the federal authorities of Germany, and State of Saxony ministries. To revive the turboprop design, SNC was set to invest €80 million ($88.75 million) in DRA while the state of Saxony pledged €6.5 million. On 29 April 2020, DRA GmbH rebranded the new version as the "D328eco". DRA GmbH was not able to use the Dornier name as the trademark belongs to Airbus and is used by its subsidiary Dornier Consulting. Instead, DRA GmbH created a new brand, Deutsche Aircraft.

The redesigned aircraft is stretched by 2 m (6 ft 7 in) to 23.3 m (76 ft), permitting it to carry up to 40 passengers, 20% more than the original Dornier 328. The adoption of advanced avionics, such as the Garmin G5000 avionics suite, may permit single-pilot operations under some circumstances. It will be powered by Pratt & Whitney Canada PW127XT-S; the engine output increases from 2,180 to 2,750 hp (1,630 to 2,050 kW) with 2-3% better brake specific fuel consumption, and maximum take-off weight is increased by 1.7 to 15.6 t (3,700 to 34,400 lb), similar to the 328JET. The company has targeted a 600 km/h (320 kn; 370 mph) speed, a 9,144 m (30,000 ft) altitude, operations from 1,000 m (3,300 ft) runways, and a fuel consumption of 2.6 L/100 km (90 mpg_{‑US}; 110 mpg_{‑imp}) each for 40 passengers; its length would be 23.31 m (76.5 ft) and its wingspan 20.98 m (68.8 ft)

In January 2021, it was reported that the first flight was scheduled to take place during 2024, while Supplemental type certification and service entry were both planned for 2025; the production facility has been sized to accommodate up to 48 aircraft per year. During June 2023, the company announced that it has commenced the fabrication of the first prototype aircraft. Deutsche Aircraft suppliers include Liebherr-Aerospace Toulouse, Aciturri, and Heggemann. Private Wings is the launch customer with an initial purchase of five aircraft.

In May 2023, the ground-breaking ceremony for the new final assembly line occurred at Leipzig/Halle Airport with a capacity of 48 aircraft per year, featuring a commissioning hangar and logistics centre. In early May 2025, the rear fuselage assembly line was inaugurated within Dynamatic Technologies in Bengaluru, India. By then, Deutsche Aircraft was preparing to roll out on 28 May at Oberpfaffenhofen its first prototype, assembled from the centre section of one Dornier 328 airframe and the nose and empennage of another one, planning to fly it later in 2025.

== Design ==
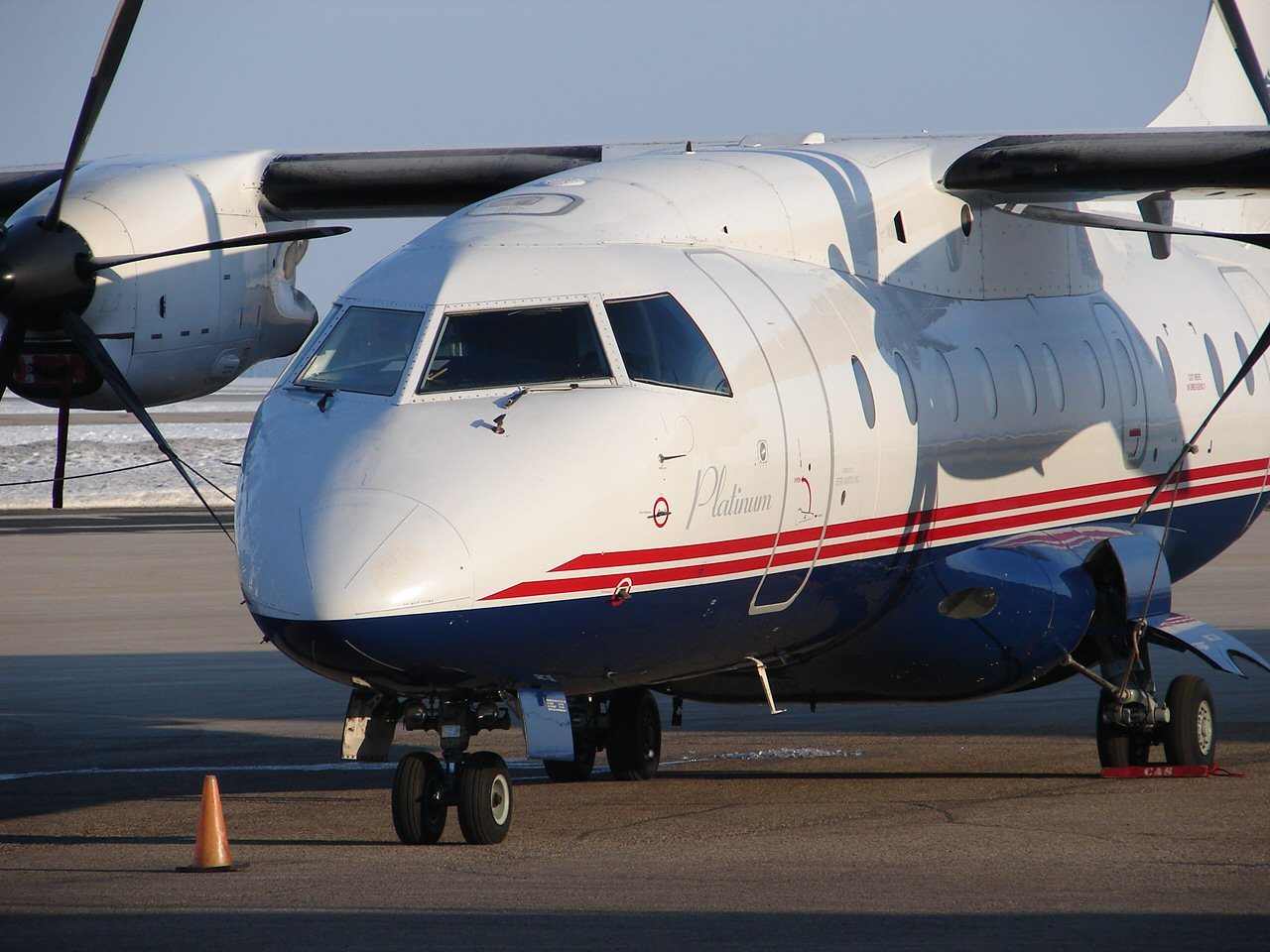
Forward section of a 328

The Dornier 328 is a twin-turboprop engined, regional aircraft, principally designed for short-haul passenger operators; Deutsche Aerospace often promoted the type as being a "third-generation airliner". The fuselage of the 328 employs an unusual streamlined shape, having been optimised for high cruising speeds; the aircraft is capable of higher cruise and approach speeds than most turboprop-powered aircraft, which allows it to be more readily slotted around jetliners during landing approaches. According to Deutsche Aerospace, the 328 offered the "lowest noise level, widest cabin, highest standing room, widest cabin floor, and widest seats in the three-abreast class". The 328 is capable of operations from semi-prepared airstrips and rough runways, incorporating features such as its retractable landing gear being equipped with high-flotation tyres and steerable nose gear and a gravel guard.

It is equipped with a pair of Pratt and Whitney PW119C turboprop engines, which drive fully reversible Hartzell HD-E6C-3B propellers. The propeller blades generate notably less noise in comparison to their contemporary counterparts due to features such as their lower rotation speed, propeller synchrophasing, and the use of a six-blade configuration. The propeller system is variable-pitch to maintain a constant engine speed. During the early 1990s, the manufacturer claimed that the use of various noise-reduction measures across the aircraft kept the internal cabin noise "below that of even some modern jet aircraft".

The fuselage of 328 allows for a comfortable three-abreast, airline-style seating arrangement to be used, as well as a dense, four-abreast configuration to accommodate greater passenger numbers, of which it is able to carry a maximum of 27. A total of six cabin configurations is available for passenger and cargo operations; these include a flexible combi aircraft layout with a movable wall separating passengers and cargo, and a medical evacuation arrangement equipped with biofloors and positions for four litters and medical attendees. The 328 is pressurized, a first for Dornier-built aircraft, implemented to achieve a higher level of passenger comfort; the passenger cabin is designed to be more akin to those of much larger passenger aircraft. A full-sized galley, toilet, and washbasin can also be installed.

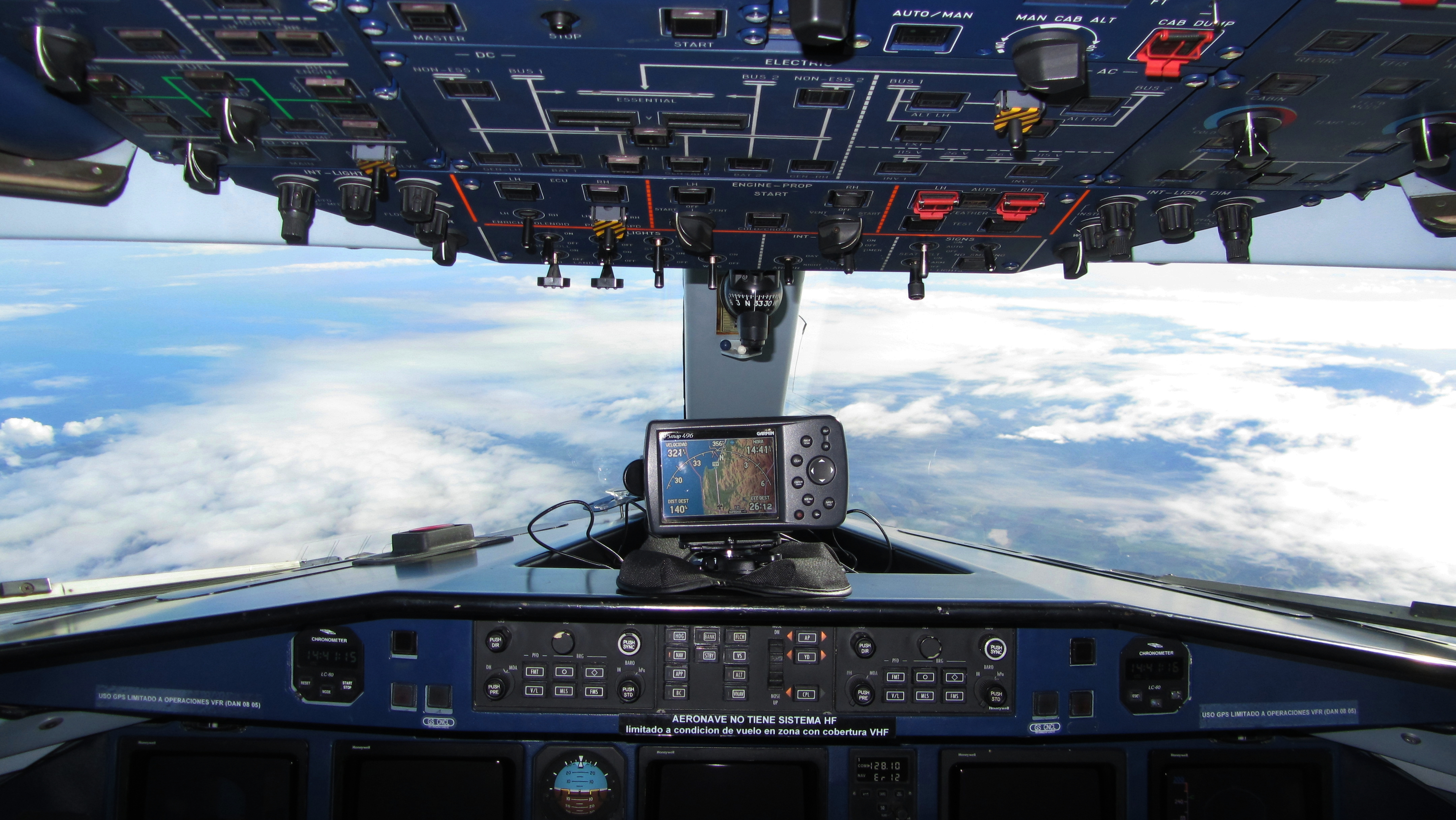
Forward-facing internal view from the cockpit of an in-flight 328

The 328 is furnished with the same supercritical wing design that had been originally developed for Dornier's earlier Dornier 228; this wing provides the aircraft with both excellent cruise and climb capabilities. The straightforward construction techniques of the Dornier 228 were also reused for the 328, despite making increased use of composite materials in areas such as the rear fuselage and empennage. The 328 reportedly made greater use of composites than any of its direct competitors at launch; the use of the Kevlar-carbon fiber composites is claimed to have reduced its weight by 20%. Various materials are used across the airframe; amongst these, an aluminium alloy is used for the pressure fuselage and much of the wingbox, a titanium alloy for the tail cone, and glass fibre-reinforced plastic for the radome and leading edge of the vertical stabilizer. Noise-absorbent material is located across the fuselage, while the cabin wall is hung from isolator brackets to reduce vibration and noise transference.

The twin-crew glass cockpit of the 328 is equipped with a Honeywell Primus 2000 avionics suite, and the cockpit has an electronic flight instrument system comprising five 20 x 17.5 cm cathode-ray tube (CRT) monitors. The central CRT serves as the engine-indicating and crew-alerting system, while the two inner CRTs are used as multifunctional displays and the outermost two CRTs perform as the primary flight displays. Addition avionics include a dual integrated avionics computer, a digital databus (a commercial derivative of the MIL-STD-1553 databus), dual Primus II integrated radio system, automatic flight control system, dual digital air data reference units, Primus 650 weather radar, dual mode-S transponder, enhanced ground proximity warning system, and traffic collision avoidance system.

== Operational history ==
In 2005, the Australian Maritime Safety Authority (AMSA) awarded a contract to AeroRescue to provide long-range search and rescue capability around Australia. Accordingly, five 328-100s were progressively commissioned from April 2006 to February 2007 and stationed around the Australian coastline to provide a 24-hour, 30-minute response capability. These aircraft were equipped with a comprehensive electronic sensor suite by Aerodata AG in Germany including; Israel Aerospace Industries ELTA EL/M 2022A Radar, FSI Star SAFire III Forward Looking Infra Red, Direction Finder and an ARGON ST Infra Red/Ultra Violet scanner. The aircraft are also fitted with an Aeronautical Engineers Australia dispatch system, allowing rescue stores to be dropped from the aircraft through a chute through the underwing emergency exit. These are progressively being upgraded with an in-flight-opening cargo door to allow dispatch of larger items, up to 20-person life rafts, and boat-dewatering pumps for open-water rescues. These aircraft were replaced by a fleet of CL604 jets under contract to AMSA.

In a historic first on 24 February 2026, a U.S. C-146A transport plane landed on a bypass road in Laoac, Pangasinan, Philippines. The drill was a joint exercise between the Armed Forces of the Philippines and U.S. Special Tactics teams to practice using highways as emergency runways. Defense Secretary Gilbert Teodoro emphasized that through the execution of the Alternate Landing Zone, the capabilities of our joint forces are tested. The culmination training of Philippine Air Force combat controllers enhanced their skills and interoperability with their Allies. The joint training marked the first time a US C-146 aircraft conducted an actual landing on a Philippine public highway, making the Philippines the second country in Asia to host such an operation alongside US forces. It confirmed the feasibility of identifying specific Philippine highways for emergency landings and paved the way for the PAF to utilize their own aircraft in similar scenarios.

== Variants ==
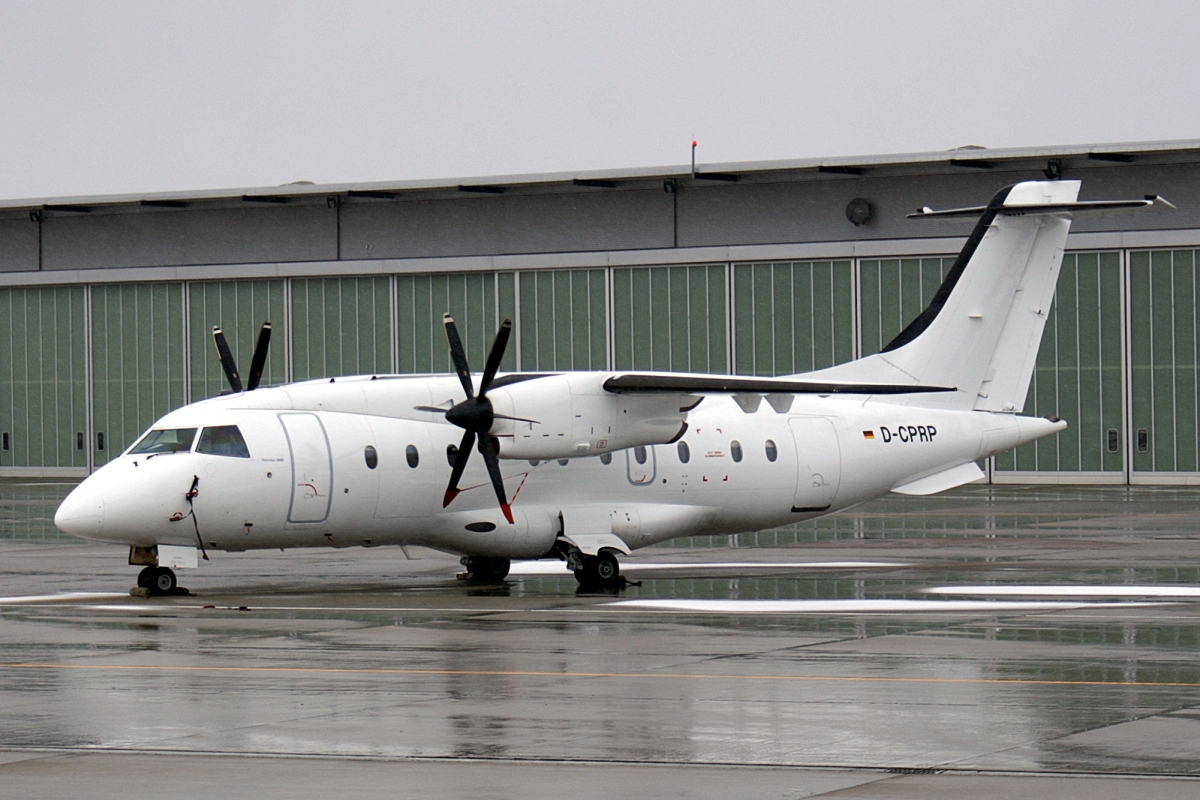
Excellent Air Dornier 328-100

- 328-100 – Initial 328.
- 328-110 – Standard 328 with greater range and weights
- 328-120 – 328 with improved STOL performance
- 328-130 – 328 with progressive rudder authority reduction at higher airspeeds
- 328JET – turbofan-powered variant, formerly the 328–300
- C-146A Wolfhound – designation assigned to 20 Dornier 328s operated by the United States Air Force's Air Force Special Operations Command.
- Deutsche Aircraft D328eco - new production in Leipzig, announced in August 2019.

== Operators ==
In July 2018, 24 aircraft were in airline service. Major operators include Private Wings (9) and DANA (4). Seven other airlines operate smaller numbers of the type. By 2018, 328 Support Services supported 200 turboprops and jets. By August 2019, 58 turboprops and 50 jets were in service, with the largest operators being the US Air Force (20 units), Danish carrier Sun-Air (12), German Private Wings (10), and American Ultimate Jetcharters (8); 19 turboprops and nine jets were in storage, while 79 have been retired. On 26 October 2026, the private operator People's announced that they would substitute their Embraer E-170 with a Dornier Do-328-100.

=== Military/government ===
Botswana

- Botswana Defence Force Air Wing (1)

United States

- Air Force Special Operations Command (20)

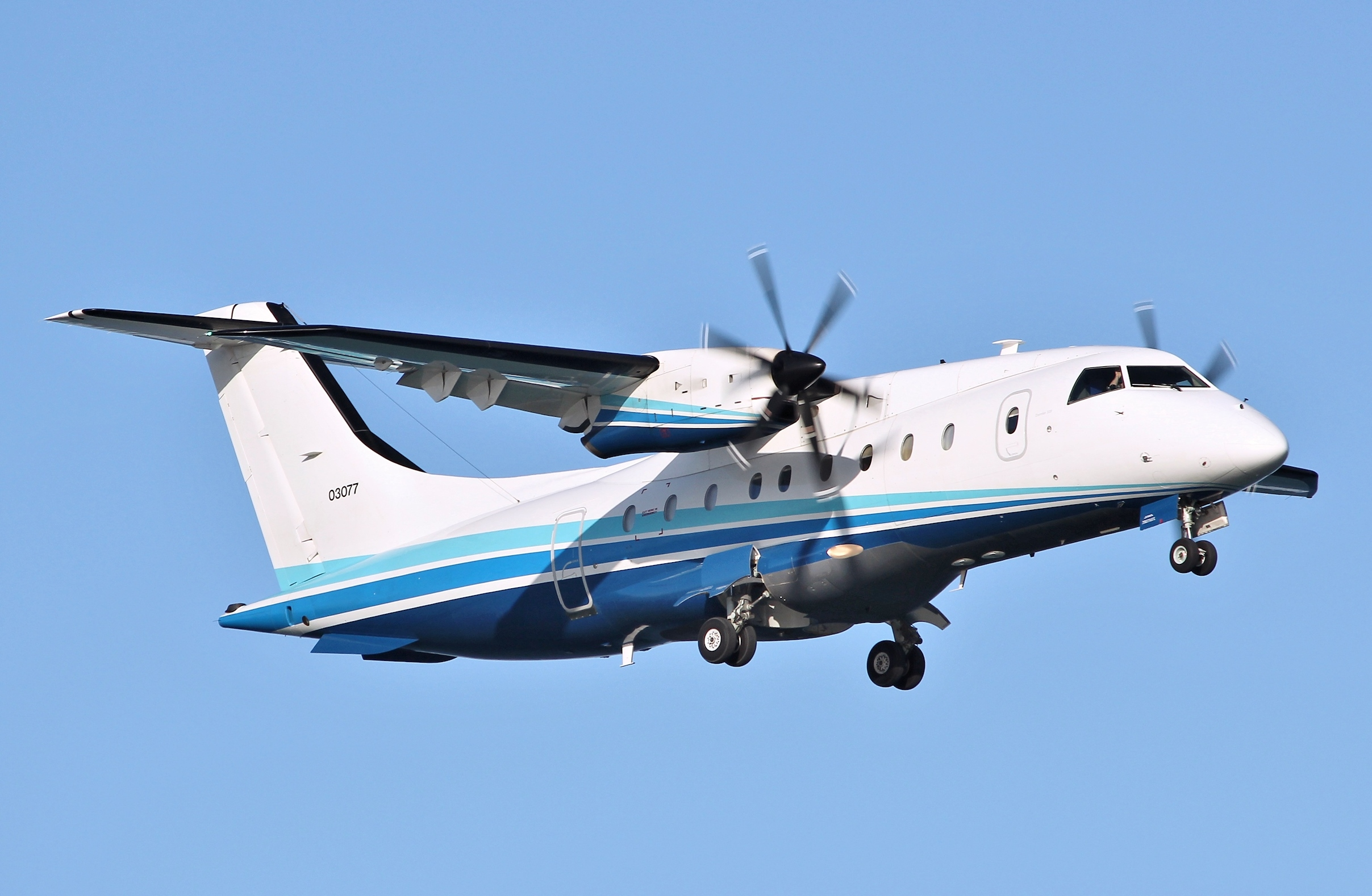
United States Air Force version C-146A operating for 524th Special Operations Squadron

=== Civilian ===
Australia

- Paspaley Aviation

Canada

- Central Mountain Air (3)

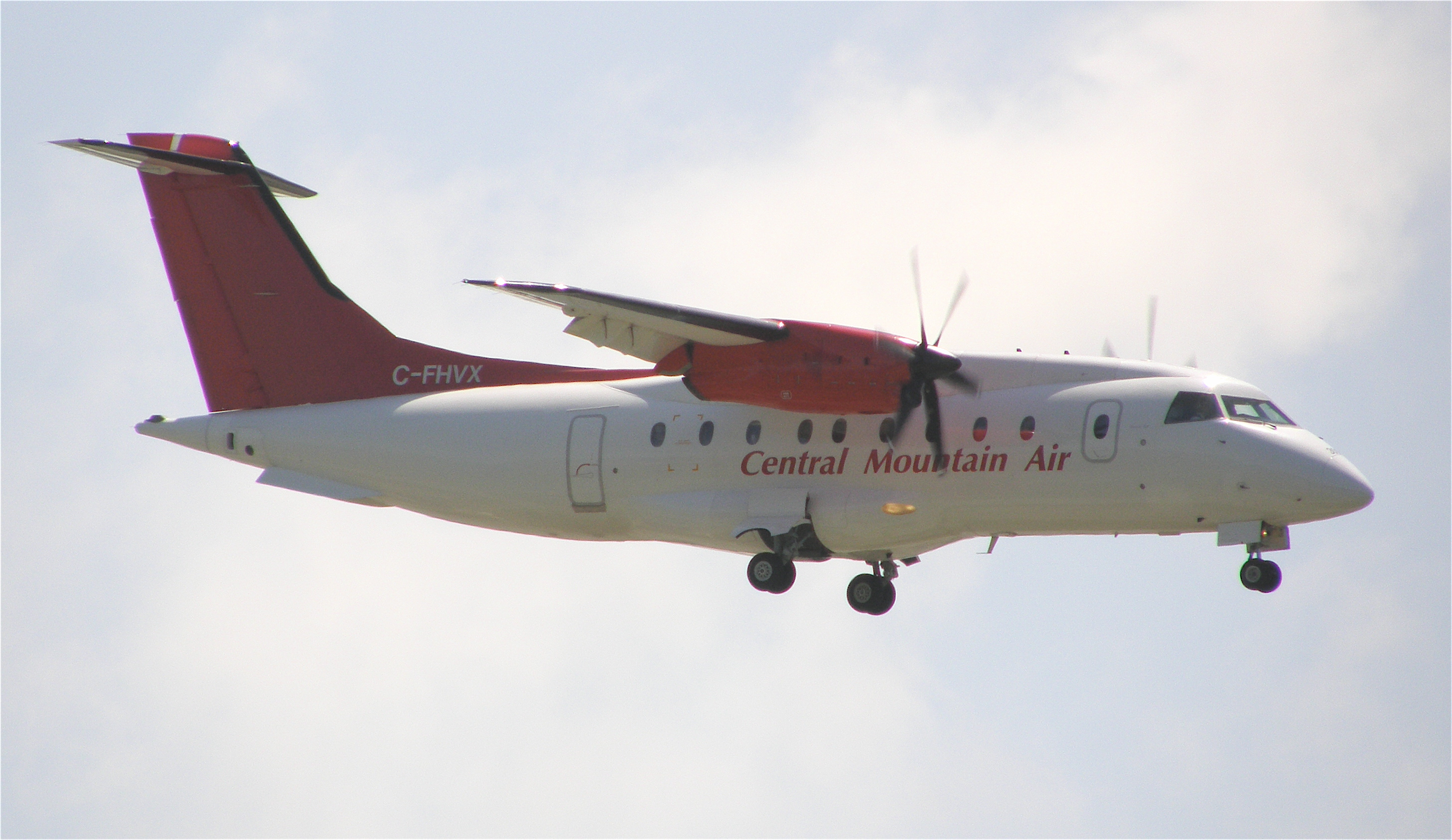
A Central Mountain Air Dornier 328–100 on approach to Vancouver International Airport

Germany

- Rhein-Neckar Air (3)
- Private Wings (9)

Iceland

- Eagle Air (Iceland) (1)

Malta

- Medavia (1)

Nigeria

- Dornier Aviation Nigeria (4)

Philippines

- South East Asian Airlines (2)

South Africa

- Avex Air Transport (1)

United States

- The Dornier 328 turboprop was operated in scheduled passenger service by several U.S. regional airlines including: Atlantic Coast Jet, Air Wisconsin, Horizon Air, Lone Star Airlines, PSA Airlines, US Airways Express, and Mountain Air Express.

In addition, the aircraft was previously used to provide passenger feeder services in the U.S. operating as United Express and US Airways Express flights.

== Accidents ==
- On 25 February 1999, Alitalia Flight 1553, operated by Minerva Airlines, was operating a flight from Cagliari-Elmas Airport to Genoa Cristoforo Colombo Airport in Italy. Upon landing on runway 29, the aircraft ran off the end of the runway and crashed into the sea. Four of the 31 passengers and crew died in the accident.
- On 11 June 2006, the Air Accidents Investigation Branch recommended a safety audit of City Star Airlines after a serious incident in which a Dornier 328 crew flew close to cliffs and failed to respond correctly to terrain warnings on approach to Sumburgh Airport after a flight from Aberdeen. The aircraft landed safely. The captain involved was suspended and asked to resign after an investigation.
- In July 2015, a Dornier 328 was on final approach to Manchester Airport at 850m when a blue UAV was spotted. Investigators concluded that the UAV was not permitted to be in that airspace.
- In October 2015, a Dornier 328 was taking off from Manchester Airport when a UAV passed 15m from the left wing tip when the latter was at 900m, leading the pilot to conclude there was a high risk of collision. A Piper PA-28 Cherokee was flying near Otherton Airfield in Staffordshire when a UAV passed about 6 metres (20 ft) from its wing tip.

== Specifications (Dornier 328-110) ==
Profile drawing of the Dornier 328 and 328JET

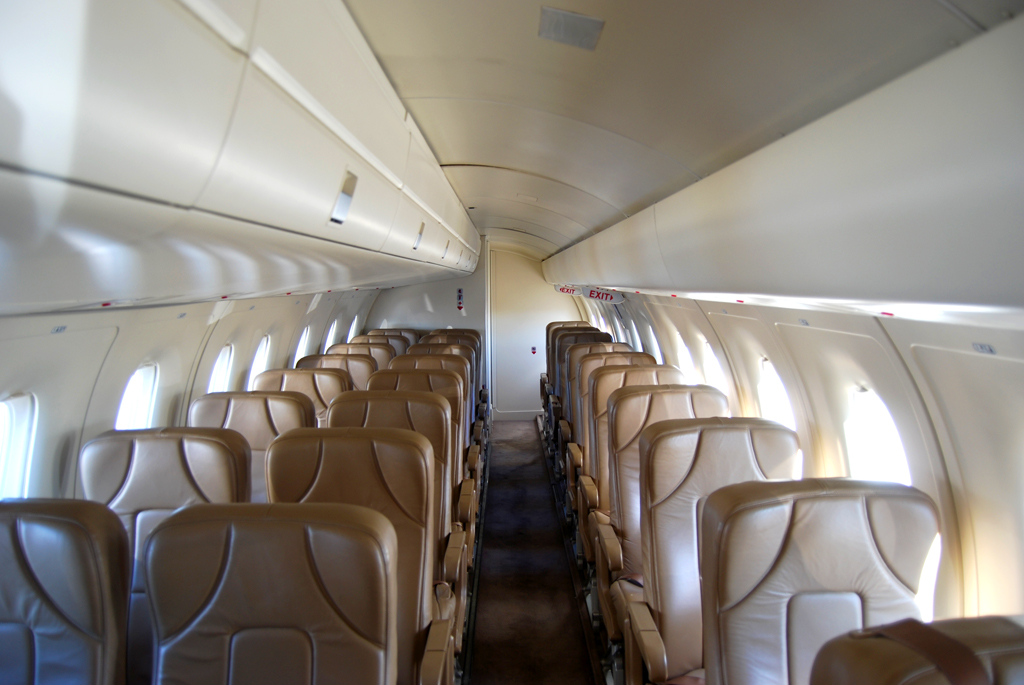
Interior of a Dornier 328

Data from Jane's All the World's Aircraft 1999–2000

General characteristics

- Crew: 3 (2 Pilots, one Flight Attendant)
- Capacity: 30 to 33
- Length: 21.28 m (69 ft 10 in)
- Wingspan: 20.98 m (68 ft 10 in)
- Height: 7.24 m (23 ft 9 in)
- Wing area: 40.00 m^{2} (430.6 sq ft)
- Aspect ratio: 11.0:1
- Airfoil: Do A-5
- Empty weight: 8,920 kg (19,665 lb)
- Max takeoff weight: 13,990 kg (30,843 lb)
- Fuel capacity: 4,268 L (1,127 US gal; 939 imp gal)
- Powerplant: 2 × Pratt & Whitney Canada PW119B turboprop engines, 1,625 kW (2,179 hp) each
- Propellers: 6-bladed Hartzell, 3.60 m (11 ft 10 in) diameter

Performance

- Cruise speed: 620 km/h (390 mph, 330 kn) at 6,100 m (20,000 ft)
- Range: 1,852 km (1,151 mi, 1,000 nmi) at 9,450 m (31,000 ft) (reserves for 190 km (120 mi; 100 nmi) diversion and 45 min hold)
- Service ceiling: 9,492 m (31,100 ft)

Avionics
Honeywell Primus 2000

== See also ==
External videos
- In-cockpit footage of a 328 during a visual approach landing
- Promotional video of a Dornier 328 private jet conversion
- Video of a Dornier 328 taxiing and taking off

Related development

- Dornier 228
- Fairchild Dornier 328JET

Aircraft of comparable role, configuration, and era

- ATR 42
- DHC-8 100/200
- Embraer EMB 120 Brasilia
- Jetstream 41
- Saab 340
- TVRS-44
