= AvCraft Technical Services =

- Company type: Private
- Industry: Aerospace; Defense
- Predecessor: AvCraft Support Services, Inc an subsidiary of Avcraft Inc
- Defunct: 2015
- Headquarters: Myrtle Beach, South Carolina, United States
- Number of locations: Myrtle Beach International Airport in Horry County, South Carolina.
- Area served: Nationwide
- Services: MRO (maintenance, repair and overhaul) company specializing in the maintenance and overhaul of regional aircraft

AvCraft Technical Services was a Myrtle Beach, South Carolina U.S., based company that supplied maintenance and technical support services for owners/operators of Bombardier Dash 8, ATR 42, ATR 72 and Fairchild Dornier 328 turboprop and jet aircraft.

Avcraft operated from a 136,000 sq ft complex of hangars, paint facilities and back shops that provide FAA, EASA and Transport Canada-approved heavy maintenance, as well as structural repairs, modifications and refurbishment.

== History ==
The company began its life as AvCraft Support Services, Inc., the North American operating subsidiary of Avcraft Inc. The parent company purchased the production rights for the 328JET from the receivers of Fairchild Dornier GmbH in December 2002 following the European company's demise. The final transfers of the type and production certificates were completed in the third quarter of 2003. The company intended to restart 328Jet production in Germany during 2004 and was bringing the production of its wing, formerly outsourced, in-house.

By August 2004, AvCraft Inc. had re-entered the regional airline market and was entering the corporate aircraft market, placing previously unsold Dornier product with a number of customers. It exhibited at the 2004 Farnborough Airshow and joined major industry associations. However, in March, 2005, the company went into administration citing a lack of cash caused, it claimed, by an airline failing to accept delivery of completed aircraft.

AvCraft Support Services continued to operate while under company administration, initially focusing exclusively on MRO support for the Fairchild Dornier 328 family, operating from a facility at Myrtle Beach, South Carolina.

In September 2009 AvCraft Support Services entered into a joint venture agreement with Indaer International, a commercial aircraft technical services company with offices in Colombia and Canada. The joint venture initially targeted heavy maintenance on ATR regional turboprops and then expanded to include Dash 8 aircraft too.

In September 2010 Indaer International led a group of investors that purchased AvCraft Support Services out of administration, renaming it AvCraft Technical Services.

In the summer of 2015, AvCraft filed for bankruptcy, laying off all remaining employees and closing down.

== Capabilities ==
AvCraft holds US, European, Canadian and Venezuelan approvals to provide MRO services in their 136,000 sq. ft. facility and 500,000 sq. ft. of ramp space. The company is ideally situated in Myrtle Beach, South Carolina, AvCraft can easily provide easy access to North American, South American, Caribbean and European customers.

AvCraft provides the following in-house capabilities:

- Aircraft Heavy Maintenance, Repair and Overhaul
- Aircraft Modifications
- Structural Repair and Modifications
- Engineering Liaison
- Flight Control Repair and Overhaul
- Composite Repair and Painting
- Avionics and Battery Services
- Aircraft Exterior painting
- Aircraft Interior Refurbishment and Painting
- Airworthiness Certification Assistance and Coordination
- Aircraft Ground Testing and Flight Test Support
- Aircraft Parts and Logistics support

And certification (Form 1 / 8130):

- Aircraft Teardown and Crating Services
- Aircraft Storage - short term and long term
- Aircraft Selection and Acquisition Support
- Honeywell dealer and HAPP (Honeywell Avionics Protection Program) support

=== Approvals ===
FAA Certificate Number CMRR055C

EASA Part-145 Approval Certificate EASA.145.5615

Transport Canada Bilateral Approval

Venezuelan INAC Approval Number OMAC-E 576.

== Aircraft Supported ==
ATR 42, ATR 72, Dash 8-100/200/300, Dornier 328-100/300, ERJ135/140/145, Cessna Caravan, Cessna 402, Piaggio Avanti P.180
