= Eles (disambiguation) =

Eles, Tunisia is a village in the Siliana Governorate, Tunisia.

Eles or ELES may also refer to:

== Places ==
- Eleš, the Croatian name of Helesfa, Hungary
- Éles, the Hungarian name of Ostrov, Sobrance District, Slovakia

== Companies ==
- ELES or Elektro-Slovenija, a state-owned energy company in Slovenia

== People ==
- József Éles (born 1969), Hungarian handball player
- Sandor Elès (1936–2002), Hungarian actor
- Szilárd Éles (born 1987), Hungarian football player

== See also ==
- ELE (disambiguation)
