= ELE =

Ele or ELE may refer to:

== People ==
- Ele Alenius (1925–2022), Finnish politician
- Ele Keats (born 1973), American actress
- Ele Opeloge (born 1985), Samoan weightlifter

== Music ==
- Ele (album), by Vladislav Delay
- Extinction Level Event: The Final World Front, an album by American hip-hop artist Busta Rhymes

== Other uses ==
- Elmers End station, England (National Rail station code ELE)
- English Language Evenings, a public lecture series
- Euler–Lagrange equation, a description of the motion of a mechanical system
- European Lunar Explorer, a cancelled Romanian Lunar lander
- Extinction event, sometimes referred to as an extinction level event (ELE) following its reference in the 1998 film Deep Impact

== See also ==
- ʻEleʻele, Kauaʻi, Hawaiʻi, USA
- Éile, a medieval Irish petty kingdom
- ELES
- Eles
