= Thomas Gumbleton =

American Catholic prelate and activist (1930–2024)

His Excellency, The Most Reverend Thomas Gumbleton J.C.D
- Auxiliary Bishop Emeritus of Detroit
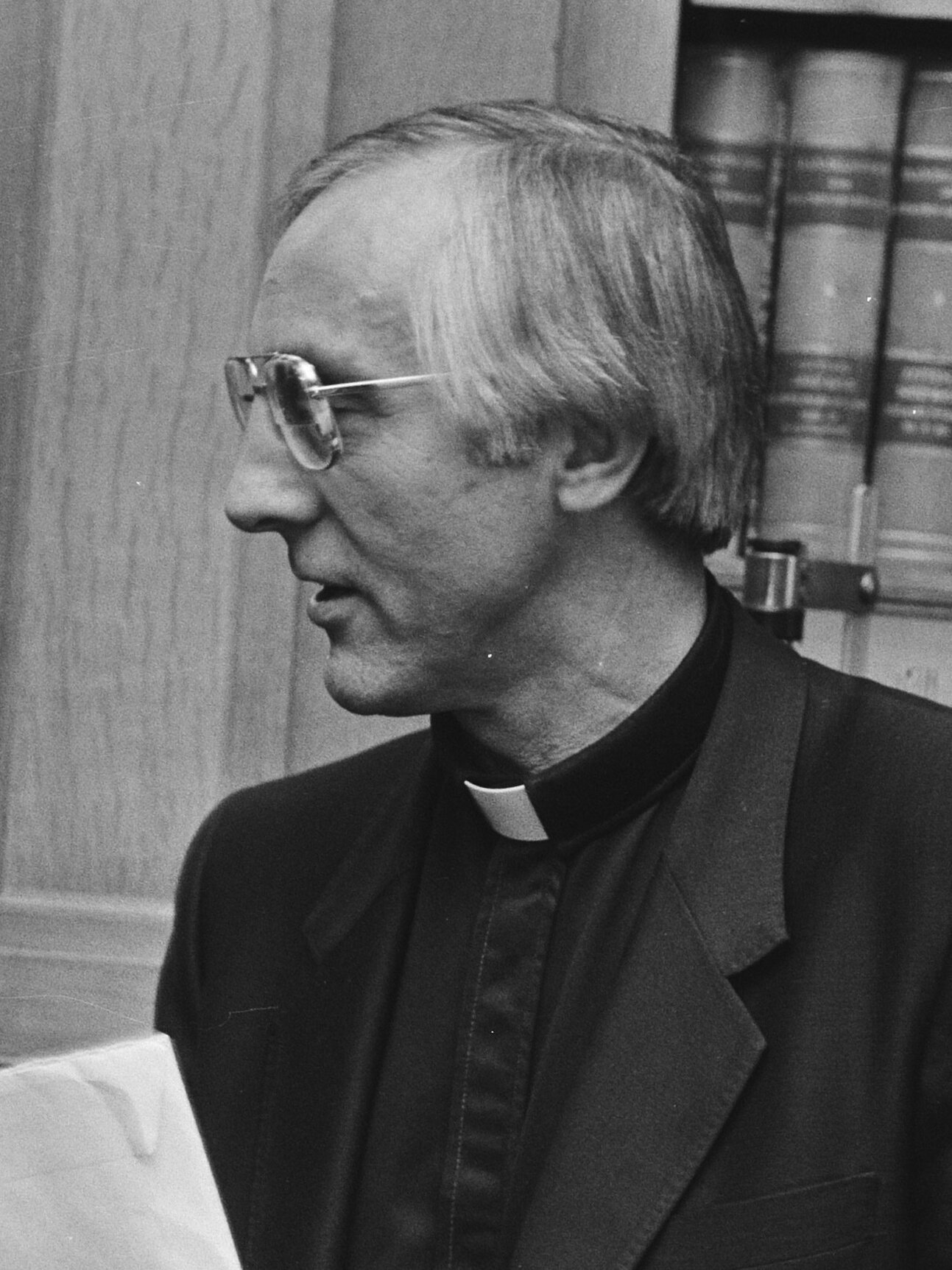
- Gumbleton in 1983
- Church: Catholic Church; Latin Church
- Archdiocese: Detroit
- Appointed: March 8, 1968
- Installed: May 1, 1968
- Retired: February 2, 2006
- Other post: Titular Bishop of Ululi (1968‍–‍2024)
- Previous post: Vicar General

Orders
- Ordination: June 2, 1956 by Edward Aloysius Mooney
- Consecration: May 1, 1968 by John Francis Dearden, Alexander M. Zaleski, and Joseph M. Breitenbeck

Personal details
- Born: January 26, 1930 Detroit, Michigan, U.S.
- Died: April 4, 2024 (aged 94) Detroit, Michigan, U.S.
- Education: St. John's Provincial Seminary; Pontifical Lateran University
- Motto: Be doers of the Word

Styles of Thomas John Gumbleton
- Reference style: His Excellency; The Most Reverend
- Spoken style: Your Excellency
- Religious style: Bishop

Thomas John Gumbleton (January 26, 1930 – April 4, 2024) was an American Catholic prelate and a prominent social activist. Gumbleton served as an auxiliary bishop of the Archdiocese of Detroit from 1968 to 2006. According to Gumbleton, the Vatican forced him to resign as auxiliary bishop when he publicly supported the passage of a state legislative bill in another diocese without the approval of that diocese's bishop.

== Biography ==
=== Early life ===
Born in Detroit, Michigan, on January 26, 1930, Thomas Gumbleton attended Sacred Heart Seminary High School in that city. He then studied at St. John's Provincial Seminary in Plymouth, Michigan, and also the Pontifical Lateran University in Rome. He earned a Bachelor of Arts in 1952, a Master of Divinity in 1956, and a Doctor of Canon Law in 1964.

On June 2, 1956, Gumbleton was ordained to the priesthood in Rome by Cardinal Edward Mooney for the Archdiocese of Detroit. In 1968, Gumbleton was appointed vicar general for the archdiocese.

=== Auxiliary Bishop of Detroit ===
On March 4, 1968, Pope Paul VI appointed Gumbleton as an auxiliary bishop of the Archdiocese of Detroit and titular bishop of Ululi. He was consecrated on May 1, 1968, by Archbishop John Dearden. Gumbleton served as the pastor to a number of parishes, including St. Aloysius, Holy Ghost and St. Leo's in Detroit, until 2007.

During the 1972 Presidential election, Gumbleton endorsed Senator George McGovern for president due to his opposition to American involvement in the Vietnam War and liberal economic policies. When asked about McGovern's stance on abortion rights Gumbleton responded that McGovern "would not aid or support the current efforts to liberalize the abortion laws."

In December 1980, Gumbleton founded the Michigan Coalition for Human Rights with former Episcopal Bishop Harry McGehee, Jr. and Rabbi Richard Hertz. Gumbleton's Sunday homilies from St Leo's parish were documented by the National Catholic Reporter, where he also wrote a regular column.

On September 10, 1981, at St. Clare of Montefalco, he ordained to the diaconate Robert Francis Prevost, who would later become Pope Leo XIV.

On May 6, 1987, Gumbleton was one of eight protestors arrested at the US Department of Energy Nevada Test Site in Mercury, Nevada. The arrestees were protesting the testing of nuclear weapons there. On June 4, 1999, Gumbleton was among 26 protestors arrested for blocking an entrance to the White House in Washington, D.C. They were protesting the NATO bombing campaign in Serbia during the Kosovo War. On March 27, 2003, Gumbleton was arrested along with other protestors for violating a ban on large demonstrations in Lafayette Square in Washington, D.C. The protest was about the US invasion of Iraq on March 19.

=== Resignation controversy ===
On January 11, 2006, Gumbleton testified at a hearing at the Ohio General Assembly in Columbus, Ohio, about sexual abuse in the Catholic church. The Assembly was considering a bill to create a legal window for victims of sexual abuse to sue the perpetrators. In his statement, Gumbleton endorsed the bill and called for all states to enact bills like this one. He also revealed that he was sexually abused by a priest as an adolescent while in the seminary. He stated:

I don't want to exaggerate that I was terribly damaged. It was not the kind of sexual abuse that many of the victims experience. They are intimidated, embarrassed, and they just bury it. I understand that ... never told my parents.... I never told anybody.

According to an account given by Gumbleton in 2011, the bishops of Ohio opposed the proposed sexual abuse bill and were incensed by his testimony. They immediately complained to the Vatican about him. A few days later, Gumbleton received a letter from Cardinal Giovanni Re, Prefect of the Congregation for Bishops, saying that Gumbleton had violated the solidarity of communio episcoporum (communion of bishops) by testifying for the bill in Ohio without the permission of the local bishop. Re ordered Gumbleton to resign immediately as auxiliary bishop and as pastor of St. Leo's Parish.

On February 6, 2006, Gumbleton submitted his letter of resignation as auxiliary bishop of Detroit to Pope Benedict XVI. Gumbleton had been required under church law to submit his resignation when he turned 75 in 2005. At that time, he had petitioned to remain in office.

=== After resignation ===
In 2009, the Marquette Citizens for Peace and Justice invited Gumbleton to speak about peace at St. Mark's Lutheran Church in Marquette, Michigan. However, when Bishop Alexander Sample of the Diocese of Marquette heard about the invitation, he asked Gumbleton not to come. Sample said that Gumbleton had not offered the courtesy of requesting Sample's permission to speak, and as Sample did not agree with Gumbleton's views on the ordination of women and LGBTQ+ rights, he was obliged to silence him. Sample called it "unfortunate" that his effort to silence Gumbleton had become public, and offered prayers for those harmed.

From 2006 to 2020, Gumbleton regularly published his sermons in a column called The Peace Pulpit. Gumbleton died in Detroit, Michigan, on April 4, 2024, at the age of 94.

== Views ==
=== Catholic teaching regarding gay rights ===
Gumbleton wrote extensively on Catholic teaching regarding homosexuality. Gumbleton often drew from his personal experience of having a gay brother. During his time as auxiliary bishop of Detroit, Gumbleton wore a mitre at a church service that displayed symbols of the cross, a rainbow and a pink triangle. The pink triangle caused particular complaints by some due to its use to identify gay men in Nazi concentration camps. Gumbleton also came into the public eye before the Vatican's Instruction with regard to the ordination of gay men was released, arguing against a ban in a 2007 issue of America.

=== Church structure and pacifism ===
In 2012, Gumbleton signed the Catholic Scholars' Jubilee Declaration on the reform of authority in the Catholic Church. On January 14, 2020, he declared that Catholics should not participate in US wars.

== See also ==
- Catholic Church in the United States
- Hierarchy of the Catholic Church
- Historical list of the Catholic bishops of the United States
- List of Catholic bishops in the United States
- Lists of popes, patriarchs, primates, archbishops, and bishops

Catholic Church titles
Preceded by —	Auxiliary Bishop of Detroit; 1968–2006	Succeeded by —
Preceded by First	Titular Bishop of Ululi; 1968–2024	Succeeded by Vacant
Preceded by New position	Founding President of Pax Christi USA; 1972–1991	Succeeded by Walter Francis Sullivan
