= Haas (rocket) =

Family of rocket space launchers

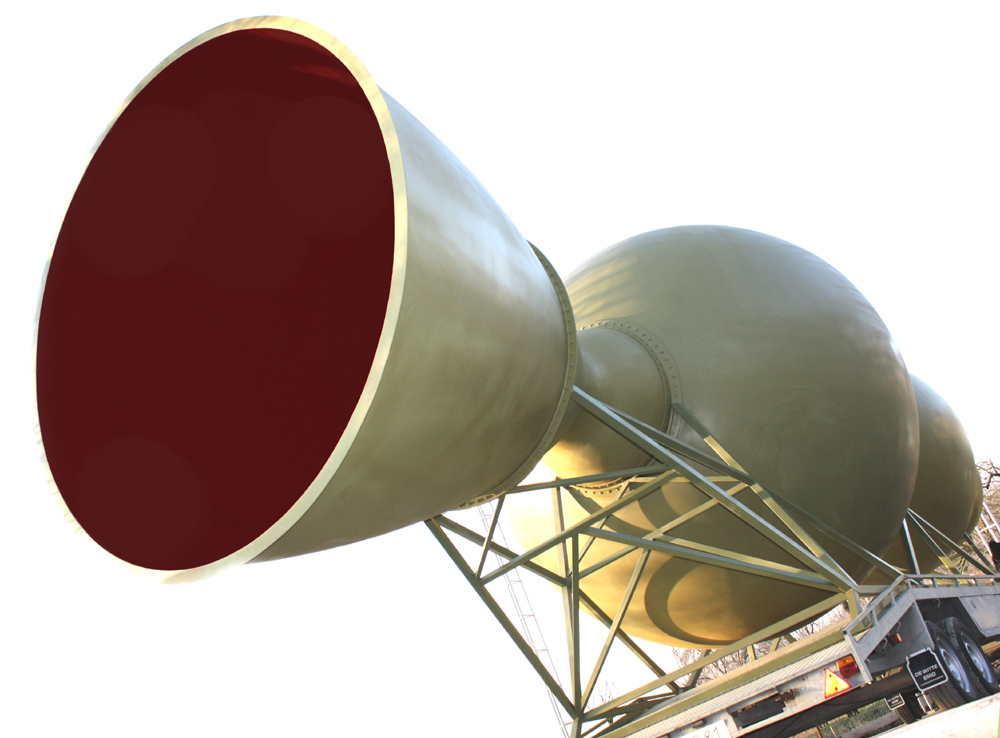
Haas rocket

Haas was a family of rocket space launchers developed by ARCAspace for the Google Lunar X Prize competition and for their national crewed space program. As of 2026 no rocket has been launched, the planned rocket types have changed significantly over time.

It was named after Conrad Haas, a rocket pioneer who lived and worked in what is now Romania, and was the first European to describe a multistage rocket in writing.

== Haas ==
Haas was a Romanian carrier rocket, which was developed in 2008 by ARCA as part of the ELE programme. It was designed to be air-launched from a high-altitude balloon, similar to the American Rockoon experiments of the 1950s. Prior to the development of Haas, ARCA had already launched two Stabilo rockets from balloons. It was powered by hybrid rocket motor, using hydrogen peroxide as oxidizer and bitumen as solid fuel.

The Haas rocket was to be a three-stage rocket intended to be capable of placing 400 kilograms of payload into low Earth orbit. Its maiden flight was to carry the European Lunar Explorer spacecraft, ARCA's entry into the Google Lunar X-Prize, following a series of engine tests which began in 2009.

It was abandoned when ARCA decided to stop using solar and helium balloons for their space program.

== Haas 2 ==
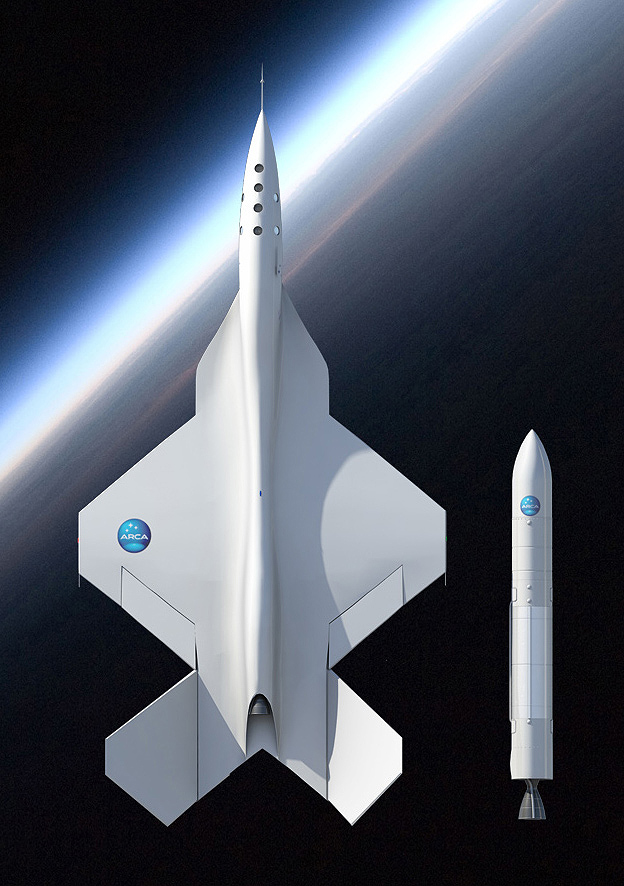
Haas 2 rocket with IAR 111 supersonic plane

Haas 2 was an orbital two-stage launcher design intended to be carried under the fuselage of the IAR 111 supersonic plane. It was planned to be powered by the new Executor liquid-fueled rocket engine under development at ARCA. Its intended launch altitude was approximately 17,000 m (56,000 ft). It was intended to place a 400 kg (880 lb) payload into low Earth orbit.

== Haas 2CA ==
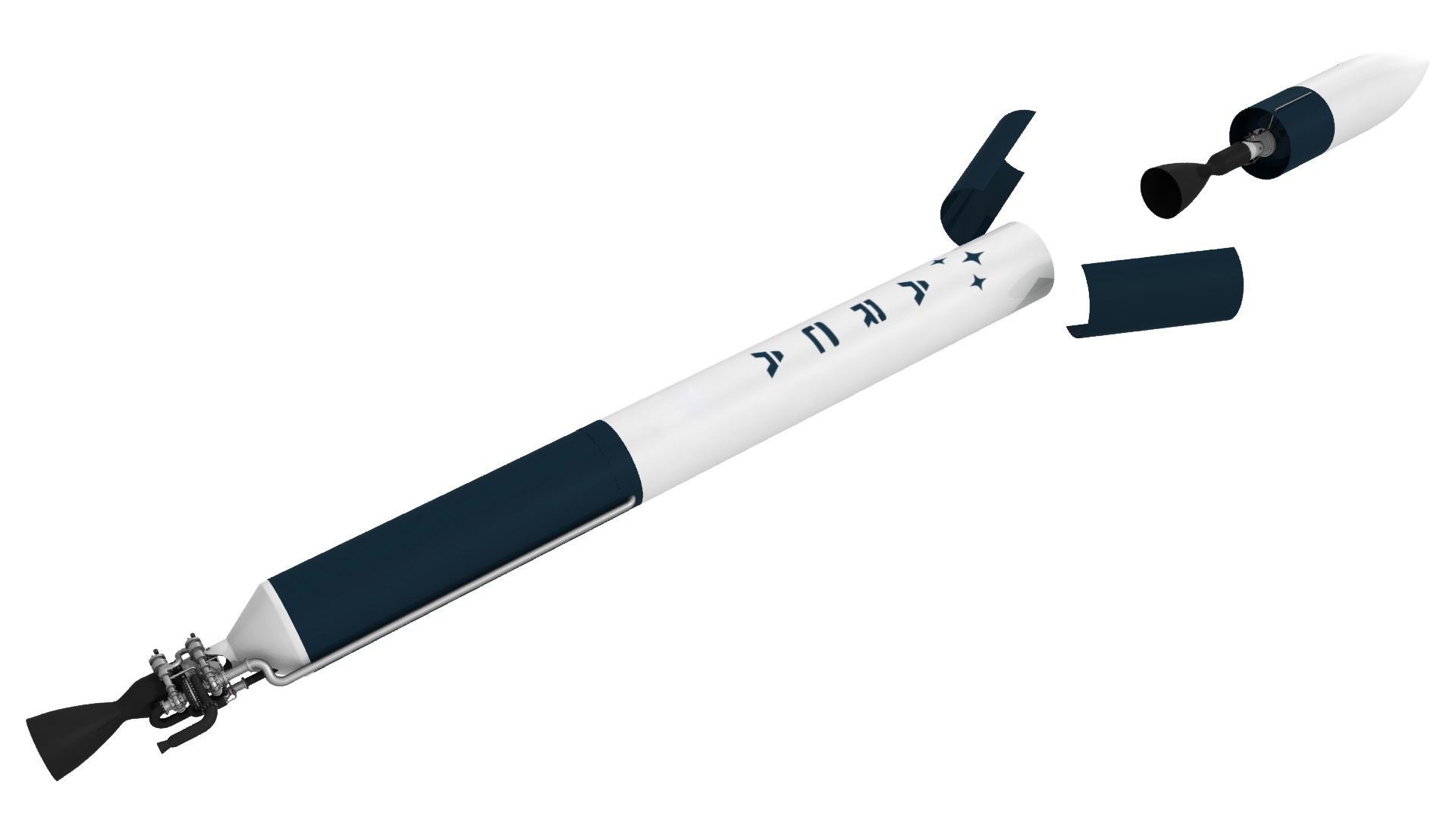
Two stage Haas 2C rocket

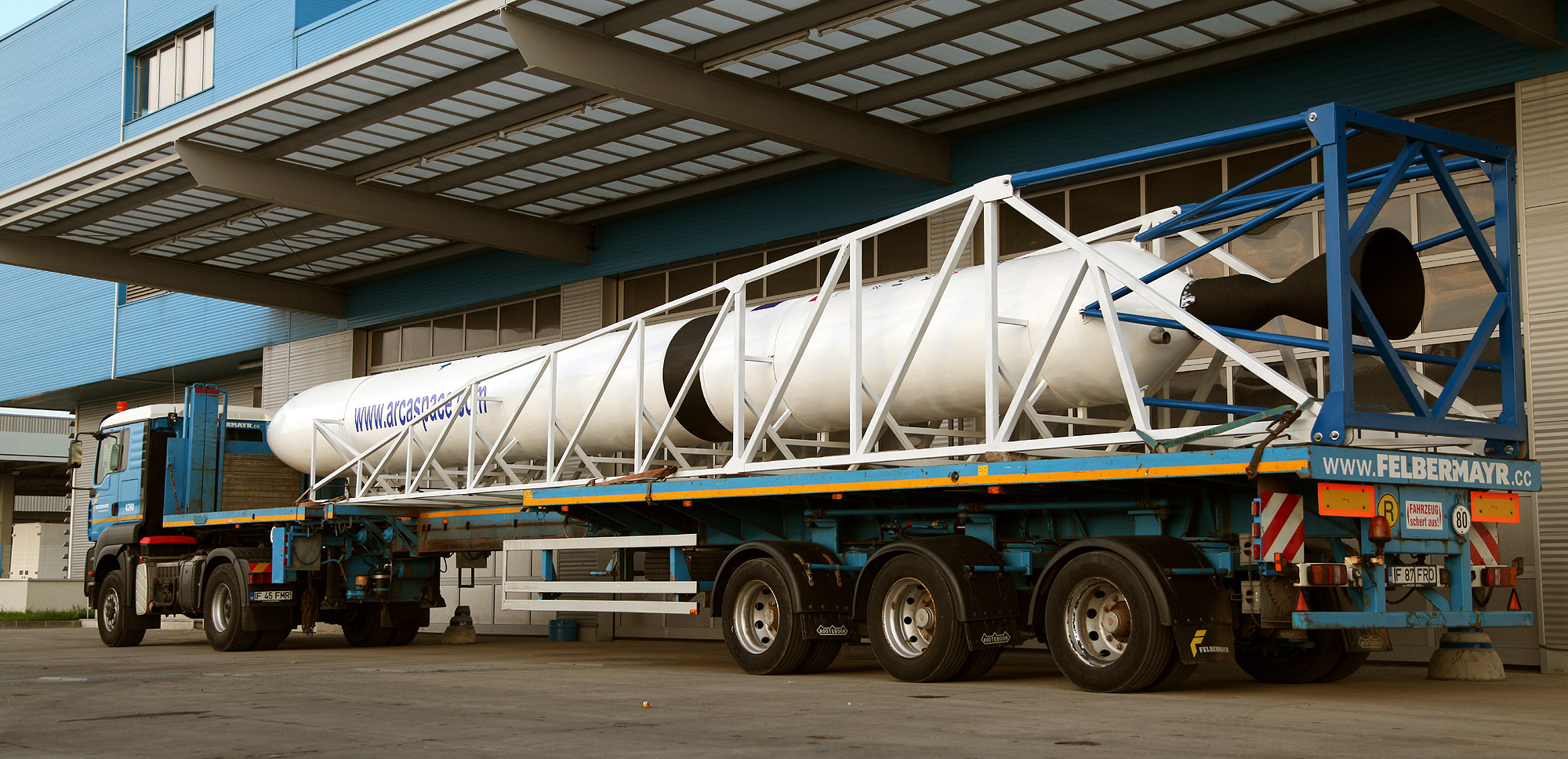
Haas 2c rocket

Haas 2CA, previously Haas 2c, was a planned flight testing platform for the Executor engine. It was an intended single-stage-to-orbit vehicle due to its lightweight fuel tanks and was originally planned for a 2018 launch.

Data from

General characteristics

- Length: 16 m (52 ft 6 in)
- Diameter: 1.5 m (4 ft 11 in)
- Max takeoff weight: 16,300 kg (35,935 lb)
- Lift-off thrust: 22,900 kgf (225 kN; 50,000 lbf)
- Payload to LEO: 100 kg (220 lb)

== 2020 plans ==
ARCAspace changed the plans of future rockets over time. In March 2020, the company announced its plans to develop ground-launched single-stage-to-orbit rockets which could optionally increase their payload with a booster stage (called Launch assist system, LAS). It was planned to test two stages of a small orbital rocket (LAS 25R and Haas mini) in independent flights in 2020, before the two would have combined for a first orbital flight in 2021. This two-stage rocket was planned to have a payload capacity of 40 kg to low Earth orbit. A larger first stage was expected for 2022, followed by a single-stage-to-orbit rocket Haas 3 in 2023, carrying up to 500 kg of payload. Combining both, ARCAspace expected to achieve a payload capacity of 3 tonnes in 2024. This sequence would have repeated with even larger rocket stages, leading to a 60 tonne payload rocket in 2027.

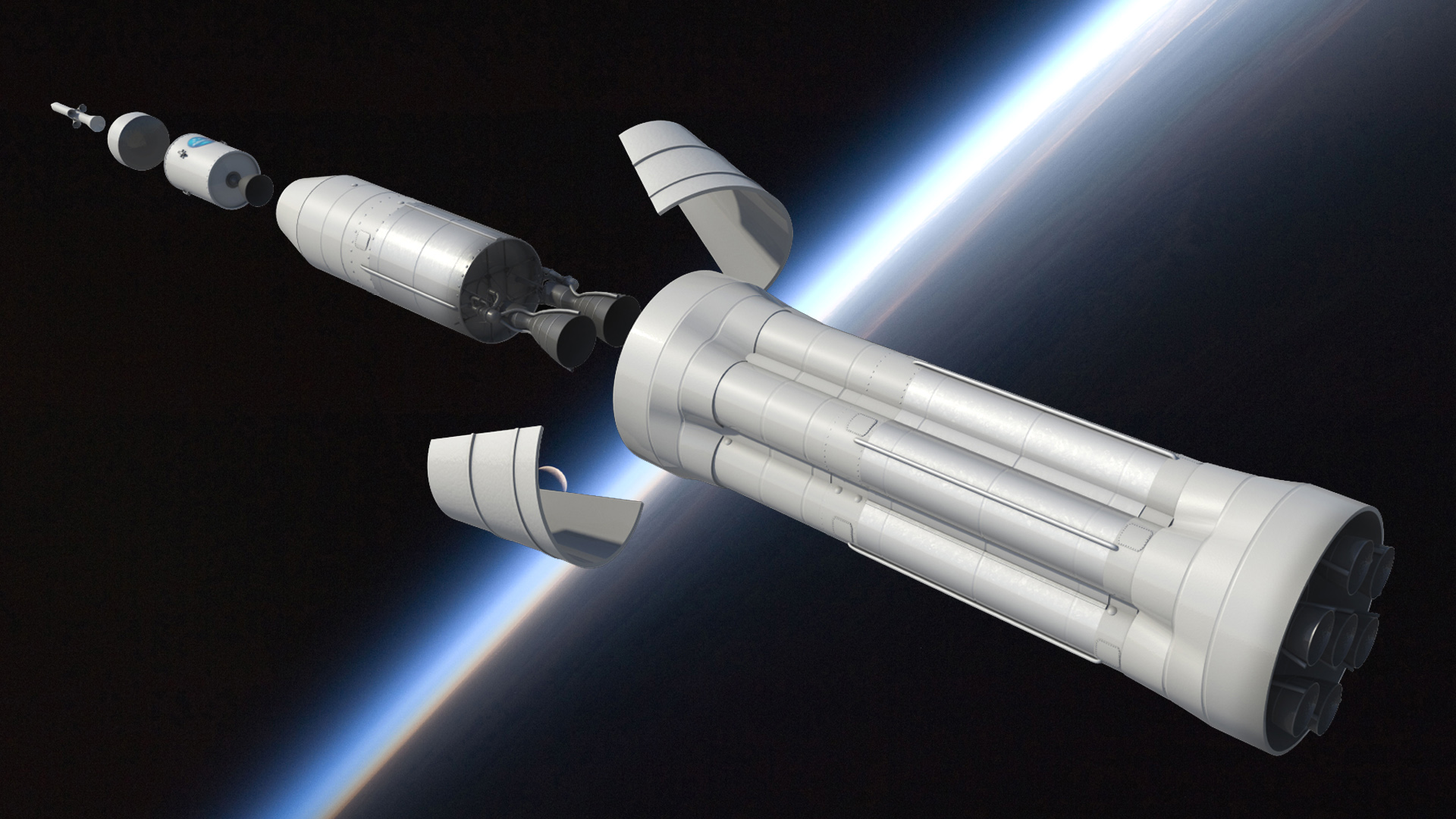
Super Haas rocket

== See also ==
- Aerobee
- Pegasus
- Comparison of orbital launchers families
