= AeroVironment Global Observer =

Global Observer
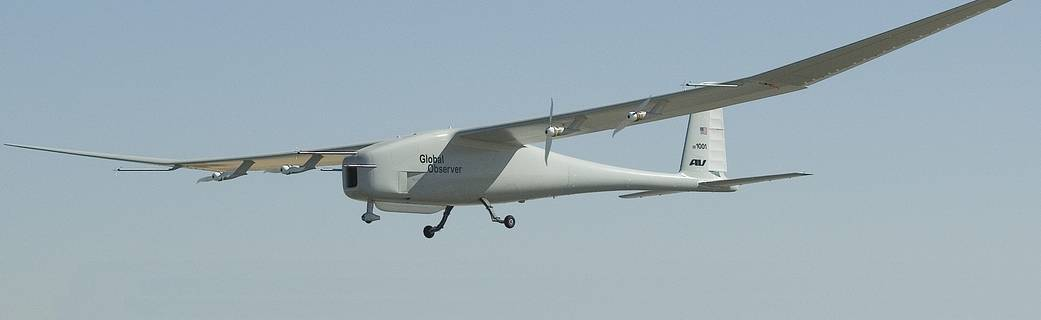

General information
- Type: Long-endurance surveillance UAV
- National origin: United States
- Manufacturer: AeroVironment
- Number built: 2

History
- First flight: 5 August 2010

The AeroVironment Global Observer is a concept for a high-altitude, long endurance unmanned aerial vehicle, designed by AeroVironment (AV) to operate as a stratospheric geosynchronous satellite system with regional coverage.

Two Global Observer aircraft, each flying for up to a week at an altitude of 55,000 to 65,000 feet (17,000 to 20,000 m), could alternate coverage over any area on the Earth, providing a platform for communications relays, remote sensing, or long-term surveillance. In addition to flying above weather and above other conventional aircraft, operation at this altitude permits communications and sensor payloads on the aircraft to service an area on the surface of the Earth up to 600 miles (970 km) in diameter, equivalent to more than 280,000 square miles (730,000 km^{2}) of coverage. Global Observer may offer greater flexibility than a satellite and longer duration than conventional manned and unmanned aircraft.

== Development ==
=== JCTD program ===
The Global Observer Joint Capabilities Technology Demonstration (JCTD) program had the goal of helping solve the capability gap in persistent ISR and communications relay for the US military and homeland security. The Global Observer JCTD demonstrated a new stratospheric, extreme endurance UAS that could be transitioned for post-JCTD development, extended user evaluation, and fielding. The program was a joint effort with the U.S. Department of Defense, Department of Homeland Security, and AeroVironment that started in September 2007, to culminate in a Joint Operational Utility Assessment (JOUA) in 2011.

The program provided for the system development, production of two aircraft, development flight testing, and JOUA with ISR and communications relay payload. The flight testing and JOUA was conducted at the Air Force Flight Test Center at Edwards Air Force Base, California. The primary objectives of the Global Observer JCTD Program were:

- Develop enabling technologies for a liquid hydrogen powered Global Observer UAS.
- Design, build, and demonstrate the Global Observer UAS for a 5 - 7 day endurance for 55,000 to 65,000 feet (17,000 to 20,000 m) altitude missions with 380-pound, 2.8 kW payload capacity. The system had to be capable of being transported by a C-130 aircraft.
- Integrate and assess military utility of modular Global Observer payloads to address user identified gaps in ISR and communications relay.
- Evaluate system life cycle costs.

=== JCTD sponsors ===
- U.S. Department of Defense
- United States Special Operations Command
- United States Strategic Command
- U.S. Department of Homeland Security
- U.S. Air Force
- U.S. Army
- U.S. Coast Guard
- U.S. Defense Threat Reductions Agency

=== Flight test partners ===
- Air Force Flight Test Center
- NASA Dryden Flight Research Center

=== Mission possibilities ===
High-altitude, long endurance unmanned aerial vehicles, such as Global Observer, may enable several capabilities that enable rapid and effective actions or countermeasures:

- Communications relay. Durable, satellite-like, affordable communications relay with substantial bandwidth capacity can interconnect and route data in real time, enabling teams and command centers separated by topographical barriers to communicate with each other.
- Disaster response. Hurricane, storm tracking and general weather monitoring may be useful in evacuation planning, relief operations and first response coordination. Global Observer provides communication alternatives in the event of cell tower, microwave relay and satellite downlink failure.
- Maritime surveillance. Coastlines plagued by transport of illegal goods can be subject to long-term surveillance. Analysts can observe suspicious activity, determine patterns of behavior and identify threats.

== History ==
A Global Observer prototype, called "Odyssey," flew in May 2005. It had a 50 ft (15 m) wingspan, one-third the size of the planned full-sized version, and ran solely on hydrogen fuel-cells powering electric motors that drove eight propellers, flying the aircraft for several hours. The JCTD started in September 2007. In August 2010, Aerovironment announced that the full-sized Global Observer wing had passed wing load testing. The 53 m (175 ft) all-composite wing, which comes in five sections and is designed to maximize wing strength while minimizing weight, had loads applied to it that approximated the maximum loads it is designed to withstand during normal flight, turbulence and maneuvers. In its third year of testing, the demonstrator had also undergone ground and taxi tests as well as taken a "short hop" lifting off the ground briefly during taxiing.

The Global Observer performed its first flight on 5 August 2010, taking off from Edwards AFB and reaching an altitude of 4,000 ft (1,200 m) for one hour. The flight was performed using battery power. The aircraft completed initial flight testing, consisting of multiple low-altitude flights, at Edwards AFB in August and September 2010. This phase used batteries to power the hybrid-electric aircraft and approximate full aircraft weight and center of gravity for flight control, performance, and responsiveness evaluation. Following this, the program team installed and ground tested the aircraft's hydrogen-fueled generator and liquid hydrogen fuel tanks which will power it for up to a week in the stratosphere.

The first flight of the Global Observer using hydrogen fuel occurred on 11 January 2011, reaching an altitude of 5,000 ft (1,500 m) for four hours. On 1 April 2011, Global Observer-1 (GO-1), the first aircraft to be completed, crashed 18 hours into its 9th test flight. AeroVironment said it was undergoing flight test envelope expansion and had been operating for nearly twice the endurance and at a higher altitude than previous flights when the crash occurred. At the time, the second aircraft developed as part of the JCTD program was nearing completion at a company facility; the $140 million program was originally scheduled for completion in late 2011, but the crash delayed this by a year. AeroVironment was looking for sources of incremental funding to provide a bridge between the demonstration and a future procurement program.

In December 2012, the Pentagon closed the development contract for the Global Observer, the reason being the crash in April 2011. The Global Observer was used as a technology demonstration, not a program for a functioning aircraft. In April 2013, the Pentagon stated that no service or defense agency had advocated for it to be a program. AeroVironment is currently in possession of the second prototype Global Observer. On 6 February 2014, AeroVironment announced that it had teamed with Lockheed Martin to sell the Global Observer to international customers. The partnership is focused around building "atmospheric satellite systems" around the UAV. The Global Observer may compete for orders with the Boeing Phantom Eye liquid hydrogen-powered long endurance UAV.

== Specifications ==
- Endurance: 5–7 days
- Payload: Up to 400 lbs (180 kg)
- Operating altitude: 55,000–65,000 feet (17,000–20,000 m)
- Propulsion system: Liquid hydrogen-powered internal combustion power plant driving four high efficiency electric motors. The aircraft does not produce carbon emissions.
- Wing Span: 175 feet (53 m)
- Length: 70 feet (21 m)
- Launch/Recovery Method: Operate from conventional 150 ft (46 m) W X 6,000 ft (1,800 m) long paved runways (<4,200 ft takeoff and landing distance)

== Similar aircraft ==
- Vulture (UAV)
- QinetiQ Zephyr
- Boeing HALE
- Air Strato
