= Executor (rocket engine) =

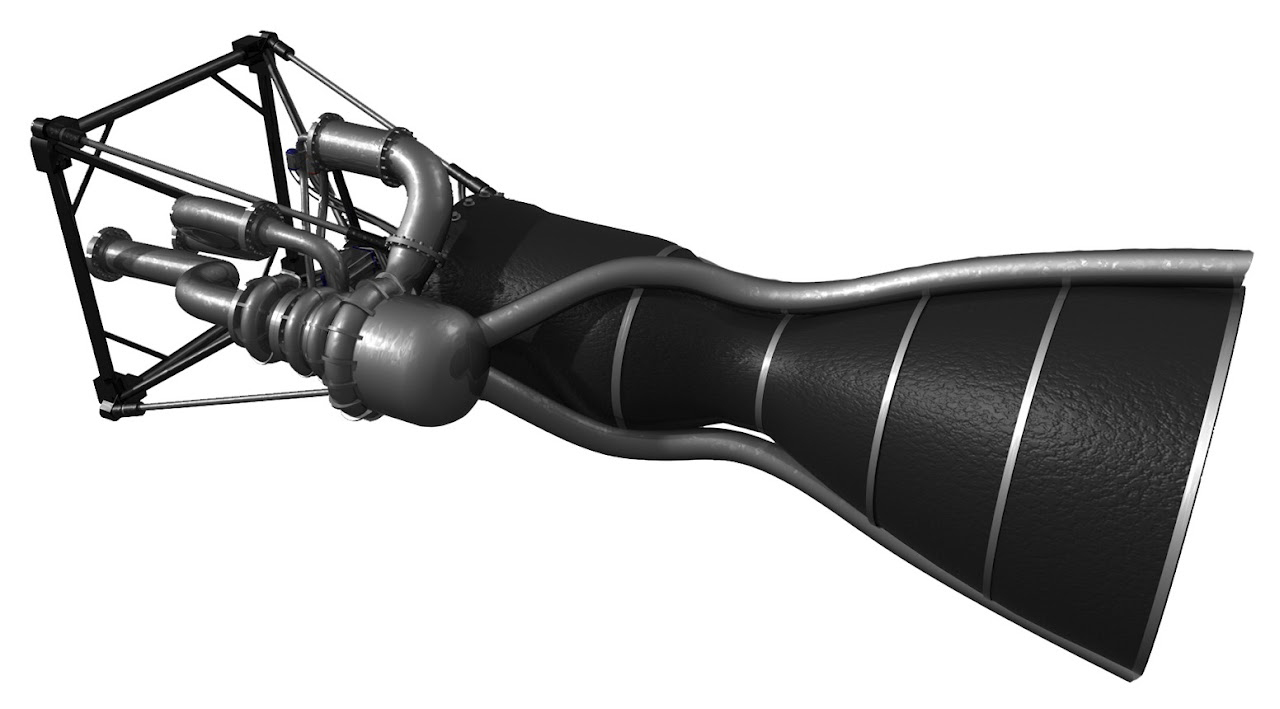
- ARCA Executor (shown)
- Country of origin: Romania
- Manufacturer: ARCA

Liquid-fuel engine
- Propellant: LOX / Kerosene
- Cycle: gas-generator

Performance
- Thrust, vacuum: 260 kN (57,300 lbf)
- Thrust, sea-level: 220 kN (48,500 lbf)
- Chamber pressure: 4.3 MPa
- Specific impulse, vacuum: 295s
- Specific impulse, sea-level: 270s

Dimensions
- Diameter: 720mm
- Dry mass: 260kg

Executor is a rocket engine developed by ARCA for use on its Haas rocket series and on IAR 111 Excelsior supersonic airplane. Executor uses kerosene and liquid oxygen as propellants in a gas-generator power cycle.

The injector of Executor is of the pintle type that was first used in the Apollo Program for the lunar module landing engine.

Propellants are fed via a single shaft, dual inducer-impeller turbo-pump. The turbine exhaust gases are used for attitude control of the Haas 2 rocket.

== Variants ==
Two versions of the Executor are in development. The Executor engine for the first stage of the Haas 2B and Super Haas launchers and for the IAR-111 Excelsior airplane. The second variant is the Executor Plus engine that it uses a larger exhaust nozzle optimized for vacuum operation. The Executor Plus is used on the Haas 2 air-launched rocket and on the second stage of the Super Haas rocket.

== Engine description ==
Executor, uses an inexpensive, expendable, ablatively cooled silica-phenolic and carbon fiber composite nozzle, and produce 260 kN of thrust. The engine's ablative nozzle is designed for a 180-second run. The internal structure of the engine is made of silica-phenolic composite, while the outer structure is carbon-epoxy. The structure thickness varies from 10mm to 30mm. Beside the ablative cooling, the engine is using a kerosene film cooling method.

== Engine development schedule ==
The Executor engine construction started at ARCA in December 2011. The first ground test was scheduled for the middle of 2012. Twelve engines were scheduled to be built in the first phase, until the first flight on board of the Haas 2 rocket in 2013. This first ground flight of the Haas 2 rocket will be for the Google Lunar X Prize Competition. After this flight, the engine will be integrated on the IAR 111 Excelsior supersonic airplane.

== See also ==
- Merlin (rocket engine)
- Fastrac (engine)
