= Slovenske elektrarne =

Slovenske elektrarne may refer to:

- Slovenské elektrárne, an electric utility company in Slovakia
- Holding Slovenske elektrarne, an electric utility company in Slovenia
