= ArcaBoard =

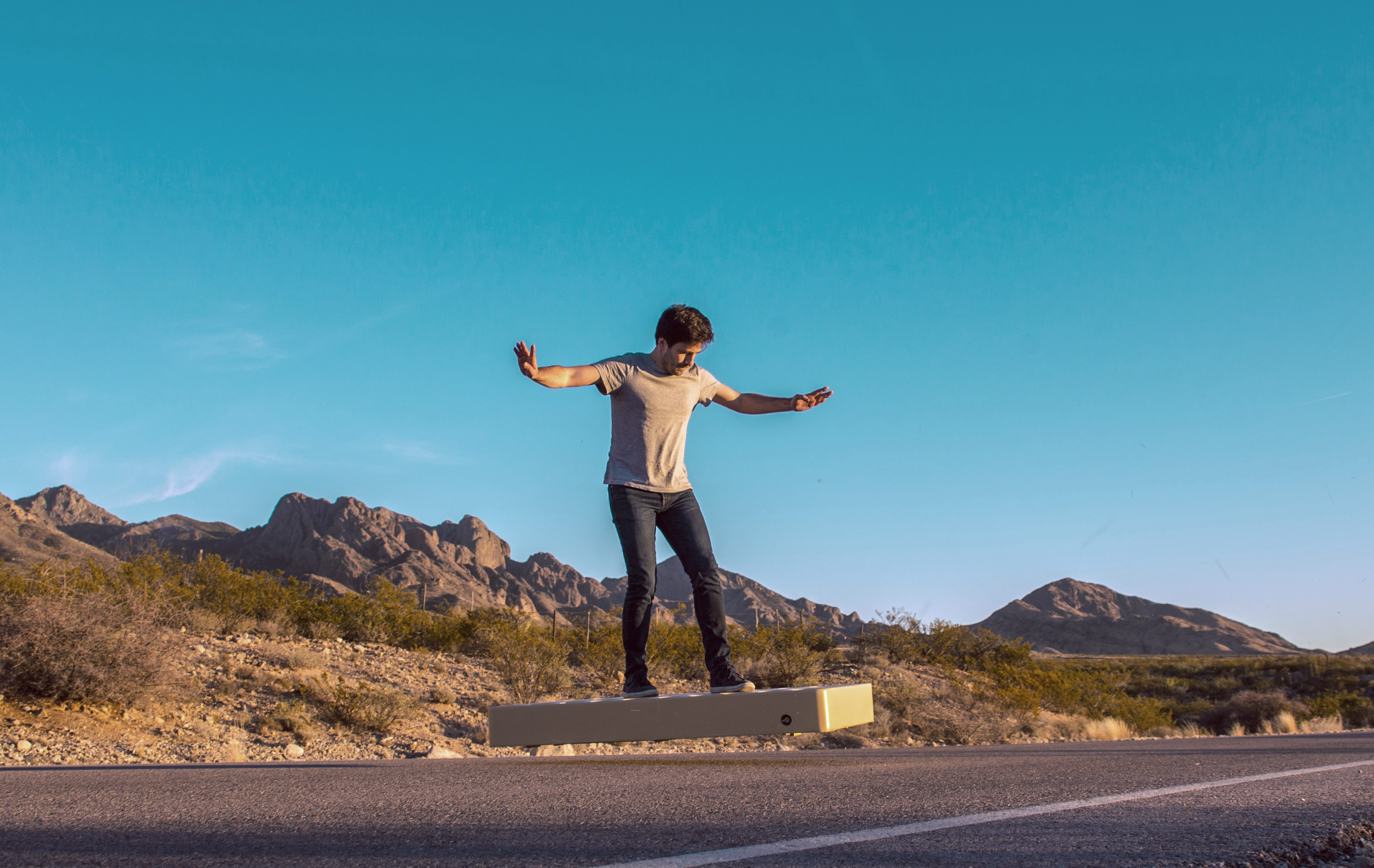
Dumitru Popescu, ARCA CEO, riding the ArcaBoard

ArcaBoard is an electric commercial hoverboard developed by ARCA Space Corporation. It is powered by 36 electric ducted fans, capable of transporting a person weighing up to 110 kg (243 lbs), and has an endurance of up to 6 minutes. It was designed for entertainment and personal recreation purpose. ARCA first unveiled their product on 24 December 2015 and announced that it was available for purchase.

== Design ==
The hoverboard is 145 cm long and 76 cm wide, is made of aerospace grade composite materials and weighs up to 82 kg, depending on the version. It is equipped with 36 high power electric ducted fans that spin at 45,000 rotations per minute and generate up to 272 hp. There are two versions available for purchase: Enhanced Thrust Version, that can lift a person up to 110 kg and has a flight time up to 3 minutes, and Long Endurance Version, that can lift a person up to 90 kg and has a flight time up to 6 minutes. Using the optional ArcaDock charging station the hoverboard can be charged to full power in 35 minutes.

The ArcaBoard is equipped with onboard sensors that maintain it 30 cm above ground and limit its speed to 20 km/h. It has an inertial stabilization system that keeps it flying level and can be controlled using a mobile phone application and by tilting the phone in the direction of desired travel. The stabilization system can be turned off and the hoverboard can be controlled by using one's center of gravity and body movements. The demonstration videos showed by ARCA were made with the stabilization system turned off. The hoverboard senses the user's weight and automatically adjusts the thrust so that the distance to the ground remains constant. Should the user accidentally fall off, the hoverboard will immediately power off.

ARCA released two videos showing Dumitru Popecu, ARCA CEO, piloting the hoverboard using body movements. The device is available for purchase on ARCA website at a price of $14,900 and was scheduled to ship starting April 2016. The charging dock and spare parts are sold separately.

== Specifications ==
From ARCA Space Corporation website

- Material: composite materials
- Length: 145 cm
- Width: 76 cm
- Height: 15 cm
- Max weight: 82 kg
- Max user weight: 110 kg
- Number of motors: 36
- Installed power: 203,000 W
- Maximum power: 272 HP
- Working voltage: 38 V
- Noise level: 92 dB
- Maximum ground height: 30 cm
- Maximum speed: 20 km/h
- Endurance: 6 min
