= European Lunar Explorer =

Planned spacecraft

- Mission type: Lunar lander
- Operator: ARCA
- Website: ARCA - ELE & Haas

Spacecraft properties
- Power: 100W solar panels

Start of mission
- Launch date: Cancelled (was planned in 2014)
- Rocket: Haas
- Launch site: Balloon

The European Lunar Explorer (ELE) or European Lunar Lander (ELL) was a planned Romanian Lunar lander. It was being developed by ARCA, as an entrant for the Google Lunar X Prize, until it was cancelled in 2014.

It was intended to have a mass of 400 kilograms when fully fueled, including two upper stages to propel it from low Earth orbit onto a trajectory towards the Moon. The lander itself had a monopropellant cold rocket engine, fuelled by hydrogen peroxide, which was to slow its descent towards the surface of the Moon. The target landing site was Montes Carpatus. The spacecraft was designed to travel 500 metres after landing, in order to explore its landing site.

ELL was the part of the spacecraft to land on the Moon, while ELE was the complete spacecraft, including the two stages intended to propel it from low Earth orbit to a trans-lunar trajectory.
