= IAR 111 =

Supersonic mothership project

IAR-111 Excelsior
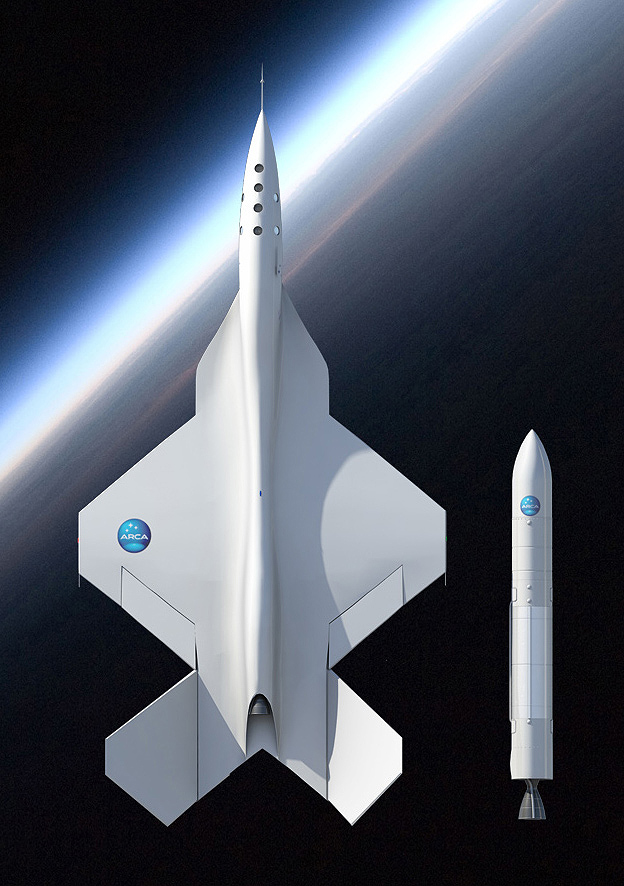
- IAR-111 and Haas 2 rocket

General information
- Type: Supersonic mothership
- National origin: Romania
- Manufacturer: ARCA Space
- Designer: ARCA Space

The IAR-111 Excelsior was a cancelled supersonic mothership aircraft designed by the Romanian aerospace firm ARCA Space Corporation. It had ambitions of being the first supersonic aircraft produced by Romania.

The IAR 111 was intended to replace ARCA's use of carrier balloons for transporting rockets to orbit. Specifically, it was intended to transport a rocket payload up to 18,000 m (59,000 ft) as well as to support the wider development of technologies related to space tourism. The IAR was stated to be capable of Mach 1.5 at 16,000 meters while carrying the Haas 2 rocket, the IAR 111 was projected to be capable of attaining Mach 1.5 at 16,000 meters, and of Mach 2.6 at 30,000 meters while configured for space tourism development work. The cockpit, which was intended to accommodate a two-person crew in a tandem arrangement, was detachable and furnished with a pair of parachutes to slow its descent. As envisioned, the IAR 111 was to be constructed almost entirely from composite materials, powered by ARCA's in-house Executor liquid-fuelled rocket engine, and was to be designed for take-off and landing from the sea surface.

The existence of the IAR 111 was announced in December 2010, although work had reportedly been underway for several years beforehand. By mid-2011, a pair of structures were being worked on, one of which was stated to be for low speed test flights while the other was reportedly for supersonic high-altitude flights. On 29 September 2011, a successful drop-test of the cockpit was carried out. In December 2011, it was reported that 60 percent of the fuselage of the first aircraft had been completed, and that an initial test flight was expected to occur sometime during mid-2012. By 2023, the project had been reportedly abandoned as a consequence of its high construction costs.

== History ==
The origins of the IAR 111 are closely linked with the founding of the Romanian aerospace firm ARCA Space Corporation. The design of the aircraft started before the successful launch of the Helen 2 rocket; early work on the project was carried out in secret throughout the 2000s. During December 2010, ARCA formally revealed the aircraft's existence to the general public via a press conference held at BRD headquarters in Bucharest. At the time of the reveal, the aircraft was still referred to by its initial name of E-111. The aircraft was intended to replace the carrier balloons that had been previously used by ARCA to transport rocket vehicles to sufficient altitude.

In March 2011, ARCA received approval from IAR S.A. Brasov for the use of its initials on the aircraft, thus the E-111 was officially rebranded as the IAR 111. Work on the fuselage moulds started in early 2011 and were completed in September of that year, while the cockpit structure was completed in July. A pair of structures were under construction; while the first was intended to perform static tests as well as for low-altitude test flights, the second structure was stated to be capable of supersonic speeds and high altitude flight.

In September 2011, the completion of computational fluid dynamics simulations for all possible flight configurations of the aircraft was announced. On 29 September 2011, a successful cockpit drop-test was carried out using a Mi-17 helicopter to lift the cockpit to 700 m (2,300 ft) before dropping it to test the parachute recovery system. In December 2011, it was reported that the first two fuselage sections of the aircraft had been completed and had undergone preliminary assembly. At the time, an ARCA spokesperson stated that the IAR 111's final structure would be completed within the following three months, and that the aircraft would undergoing testing towards a flight, in collaboration with multiple state institutions, during mid-2012. In March 2012, it was reported that ARCA has completed work on the first combustion chamber and nozzle of the first Executor iquid-fuelled rocket engine, which was intended to power the IAR 111.

By 2023, no known flight of the IAR 111 had taken place and ARCA was seemingly concentrating on other projects, leading to media speculation that the project had been quietly abandoned.

== Design ==
=== Features ===
The IAR 111 was designed to both take-off from, and land upon, the surface of the sea. ARCA decided to use this approach to eliminate the need for landing gear and thus reduce the cost of the aircraft. Another factor that went into the decision was that Romania has no unpopulated areas above which to safely test the aircraft to high altitude flights. The envisioned mission profile for the IAR 111 consisted of its take-off from the sea surface, followed by a horizontal acceleration phase from low subsonic speeds before a rapid ascent that would reach 48,000 feet within approximately two minutes, to the altitude of 48,000 feet before releasing the Haas 2 rocket, after which the aircraft would descend for a water-based landing. While carrying the Haas 2 rocket, the IAR 111 was projected to be capable of attaining Mach 1.5 at 16,000 meters; in its alternate space tourism development platform configuration, it was stated to be capable of reaching Mach 2.6 at 30,000 meters.

The aircraft was designed with diamond-shaped wings that reportedly both reduce weight and lower drag during high speed flight. A "V" tail configuration was selected to avoid contact with the water on take-off and landing. For buoyancy, the IAR 111 was to be provisioned with a pair of floats between which the payload would be positioned, which would also function as a third float. The payload would have either been the Haas 2 rocket or an external fuel tank.

The flight control surfaces would have been actuated using hydraulic power, and control would have been exercised via a fly-by-wire arrangement. The aircraft was to have been powered by ARCA's in-house Executor liquid-fuelled rocket engine; it would have used kerosene as fuel and liquid oxygen as an oxidizer.

=== Cockpit ===
The cockpit was have accommodated two people - the pilot and navigator - arranged in a tandem seating configuration. The forward position, intended for the pilot, would have been provided with a central console featuring analogue navigation equipment along with GPS and a panoramic screen for a high-definition television to give greater visibility for assisting in the take-off and landing phases, while the sides would have populated by the radio communication apparatus, along with the various controls necessary for handling the aircraft. The rear position, occupied by the navigator, would have had their own console to display the various operating parameters of the aircraft, along with radio communication, navigation, passive radar, and TV visuals for monitoring of the aircraft.

The cockpit walls and windows are very thick, able to withstand an engine explosion in case of failure of the rocket. Additionally, the cockpit is detachable and is equipped with a pair of rocket-propelled parachutes slow and stabilise its descent. The detach mechanism was to use a pneumatic system. The aircraft will have a very large recovery parachute and a smaller anti-stall parachute. Mission 6 tested the safety systems with a drop test from 700 m (2,300 ft), during which one of the parachutes was opened to test the explosive bolts. This test was reported to be a success and that the cabin had been recovered in good condition.

== Specifications ==
The specifications released to date are approximate design goals, and include:

Data from ARCA Space Corporation

General characteristics

- Crew: 2
- Length: 24 m (78 ft 9 in)
- Wingspan: 12 m (39 ft 4 in)
- Height: 5 m (16 ft 5 in)
- Wing area: 100 m^{2} (1,100 sq ft)
- Empty weight: 7,200 kg (15,873 lb)
- Gross weight: 19,000 kg (41,888 lb)
- Max takeoff weight: 23,000 kg (50,706 lb)
- Powerplant: 1 × Executor iquid-fuelled rocket engine, 200 kN (44,000 lbf) thrust

Performance

- Maximum speed: Mach 2.6
- Service ceiling: 100,000 m (330,000 ft)
- Rate of climb: 250 m/s (49,000 ft/min)
- Wing loading: 230 kg/m^{2} (47 lb/sq ft)
- Thrust/weight: 2.316

== See also ==
- Northrop YF-23, similar wing and tail shape
- Boeing NB-52 & North American X-15
- Pegasus (rocket)
- Shuttle Carrier Aircraft
- SpaceShipOne
