= Holding Slovenske elektrarne =

Holding Slovenske elektrarne HSE
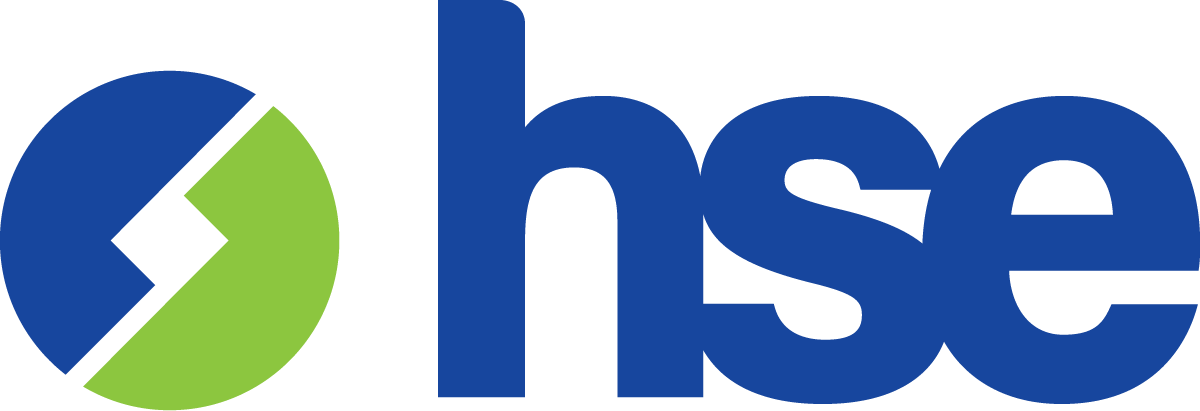
- Company type: Limited liability company (d.o.o.)
- Industry: Energy
- Founded: 2001
- Founder: Government of Slovenia
- Headquarters: Ljubljana, Slovenia
- Products: electric power
- Revenue: 1,519,000,000 euro (2018)
- Net income: 9,500,000 euro (2018)
- Owner: Government of Slovenia
- Number of employees: 174 (2018)
- Website: www.hse.si

Holding Slovenske elektrarne (HSE) – the HSE group – is one of Slovenia’s leading energy companies, the largest producer of electricity from renewable sources, and a key player in the country’s wholesale electricity market. The HSE group operates hydroelectric power plants on the Drava, Sava, and Soča rivers, the Avče pumped-storage plant, and several solar power plants.

HSE has the following subsidiaries:

- Dravske elektrarne Maribor (Drava Hydroelectric Plants in Maribor)
- Soške elektrarne Nova Gorica (Soča Hydroelectric Plants in Nova Gorica)
- HSE Invest
- HSE - Energetska družba Trbovlje
- ECE
- ENERGIJA PLUS
- HSE SAŠA
- RGP
- HSE Balkan Energy d.o.o.
- HSE MAK Energy DOOEL
- HSE BH Energetsko preduzeće d.o.o. Sarajevo
- HSE Praga

== See also ==
- Elektro-Slovenija
