= AirStrato =

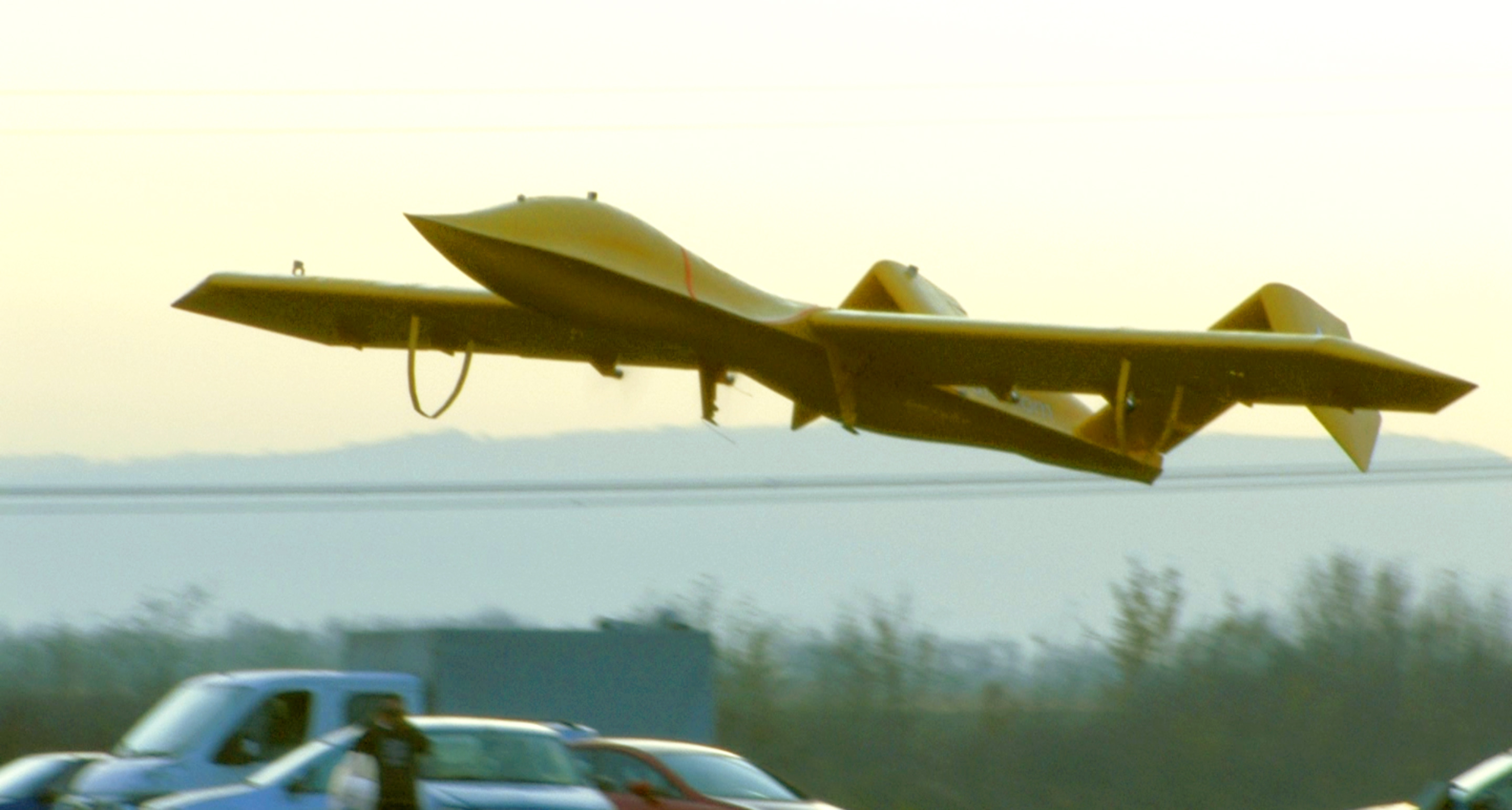

General information
- Type: Unmanned aerial vehicle
- Manufacturer: ARCAspace
- Status: Not Active

History
- Manufactured: 3
- First flight: February 28, 2014

AirStrato is a solar powered medium-sized unmanned aerial vehicle that was being developed by ARCAspace. There were two variants planned, AirStrato Explorer with a target flight ceiling of 18,000 m and AirStrato Pioneer with a target flight ceiling of 8000 m. It was planned to carry a 45 kg payload consisting of surveillance equipment, scientific instruments or additional battery pods for extended autonomy. The first prototype maiden flight took place on February 28, 2014. It was equipped with a fixed landing gear. Two more prototypes were constructed that lacked a landing gear. Instead ARCA opted for a pneumatic catapult as a launcher and landing skids and a recovery parachute for landing. Both prototypes performed take-off and landing testing and low altitude flights.

== Development ==
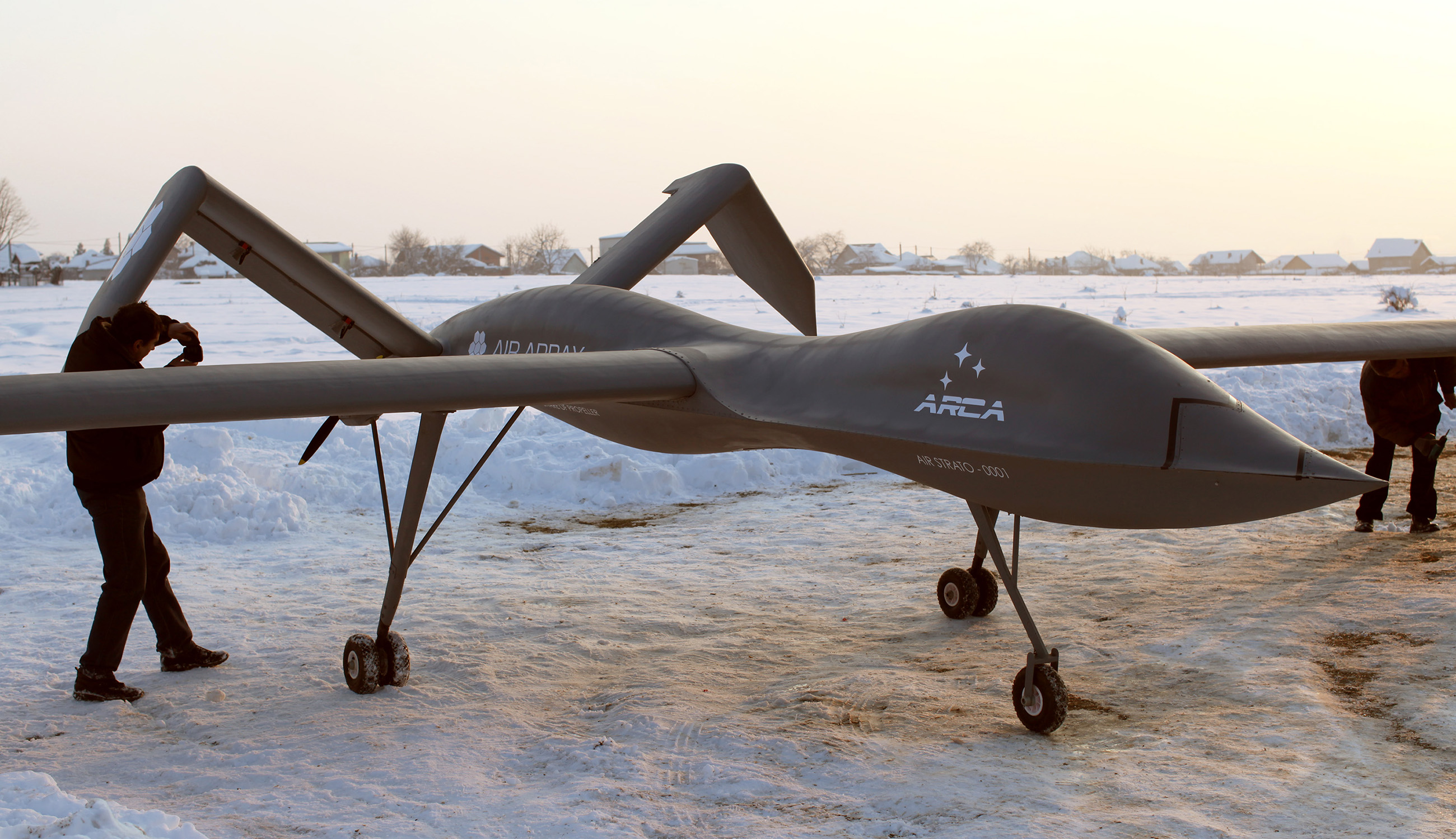
AirStrato prototype 001 before takeoff

AirStrato was first presented by ARCA on February 10, 2014, as an alternative to the stratospheric balloons that had been used before in missions involving the Helen and Stabilo programs and the high altitude flights for the ExoMars program. Although capable of carrying less payload than a helium or solar balloon, the aircraft had a much lower cost per mission and could stay in the stratosphere for longer periods of time. Unlike a weather balloon that could not be steered and relied on wind forecasts to predict its trajectory the AirStrato could be remote controlled by a pilot on the ground. At that time ARCA designed the UAV to fulfill its own requirements for high altitude equipment testing and had a commercial version of the aircraft for consideration. The first prototype was equipped with a fixed landing gear and had two electric motors.

After a series of runway testing on rough ground, suspensions were added to the landing gear to improve handling and the number of electric motors was increased to four. The first prototype flew on February 28, 2014. ARCA released several images of AirStrato taking off and flying at very low altitude. The press release stated that the right landing gear suspension was damaged on landing.

For nine months ARCA did not make public any news on the progress of the program, until November 10 when it released a short teaser on the aircraft featuring two other models in red and yellow colours performing flights. The two models lacked a landing gear. On its website it presented the aircraft as intended to fill a gap between large military grade UAV and small scale affordable drones for small businesses and individuals. On November 25 it made public the product website alongside a much longer video presenting the aircraft taking off from a pneumatic launcher and performing low altitudes flights. The aircraft were equipped with landing skids and deployable parachutes. Two versions of the aircraft are available, a larger stratospheric flying model with longer endurance, named Explorer and a slightly smaller version intended for lower altitudes and having less endurance, named Pioneer.

In 2015, ARCA received $215,000 of seed funding from Anova Technologies to develop the AirStrato UAV. Additional funding, totaling $750,000, was to be invested if ARCA met certain development milestones, including flight tests and FAA certification. However, after a series of business disputes about additional funding, the AirStrato program was sold to Anova Technologies.

== Design ==
=== Airframe ===
The airframe is constructed entirely from composite materials making possible for radio antennae to be placed inside the fuselage instead of outside such is usual for normal aircraft. At the base of the fuselage, underneath the wings there are two skids used for mounting and sliding across the side rails of the pneumatic catapult. Another small skid is installed underneath the frontal part of the fuselage that attaches to the middle rail of the catapult. Two more large skids are placed at the far edge of the wings. The parachute container is installed in the frontal part of the fuselage. The parachute can be deployed for landing or in case of emergency.

=== Engines and power ===
Six electric driven propeller engines are installed on the wings that generate a combined thrust of 250 lbf at sea level. Although the power output remains constant as altitude increases the propellers lose their effectiveness but are still able to provide cruising speed of 152 km/h at altitude for the Explorer and 100 km/h for the Pioneer. The electrical motors are powered by internal batteries during night and solar panels during daytime. The solar panels generate 2800W for the Explorer and 1800W for the Pioneer.

=== Avionics and control ===
The aircraft are equipped with inertial flight stabilization and autopilot. The GPS is linked with the transponder providing both altitude and coordinates, capable of being integrated into the US NextGeneration Air Transportation System. The control is via internet, using GSM networks where available and satellite connection everywhere else. The autopilot prevents the aircraft from entering restricted areas, can automatically takeover flying in case all communication is lost and attempt to contact ARCA technical support in case of emergency. It also is able to fly to a predetermined secure area and automatically deploy the parachute in case connection can no longer be established. The autopilot can also control the on-board camera to target specific locations and film them for a pre-determined period of time. The connection between the aircraft and the ground pilot are encrypted using Transport Layer Security with AES 256 encryption standard.

=== Pneumatic launcher ===
A compressed air catapult is used as a takeoff method for both models. The internal pneumatic piston has a force of 2,200 lbf, able to propel the aircraft to take-off speed in less than a second. It is also constructed from composite materials and has an internal compressor that requires an external power source (power outlet or generator). It is made of three parts: the upper part that contains the rails, compressor and canister and the leg that is made of the main part and a crosspiece.

== Variants ==
=== Explorer ===
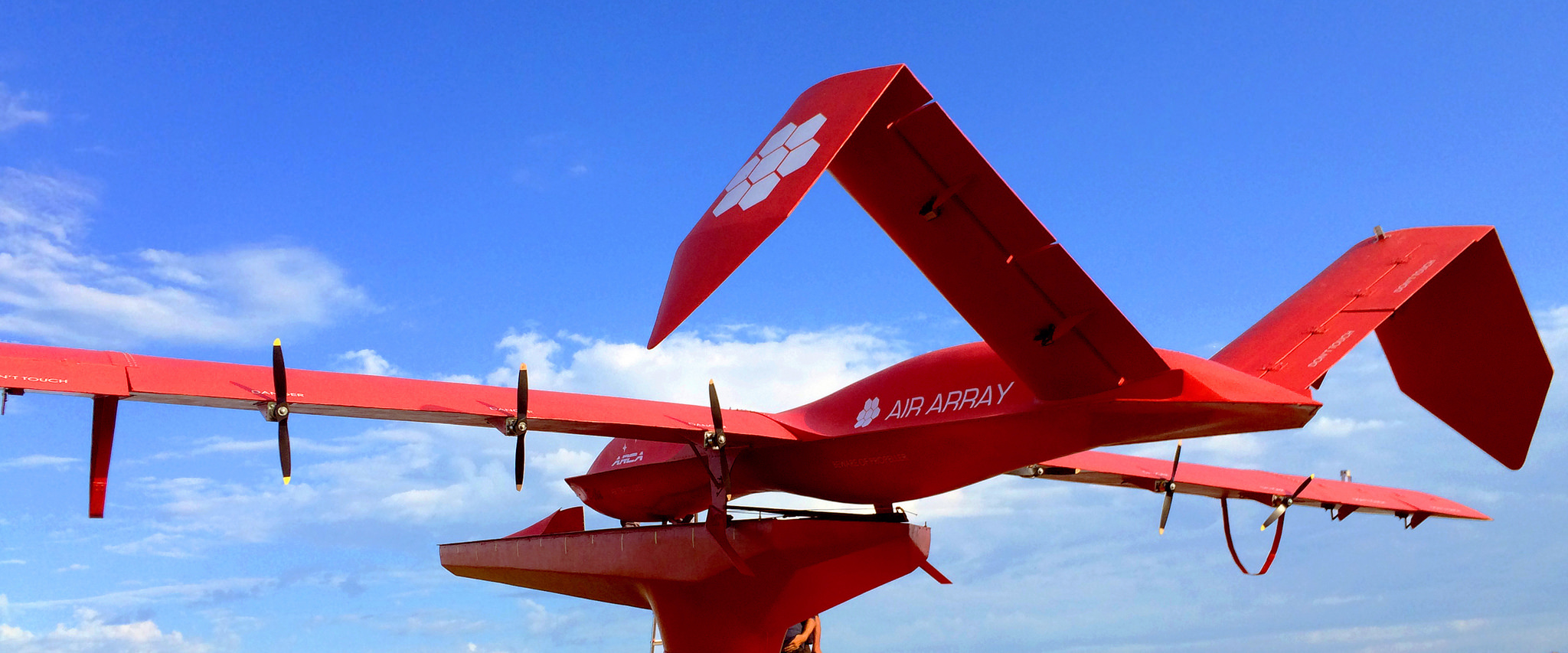
Airstrato prototype 002 on pneumatic launcher

It was the most expensive of the two models and with the projected highest performance. The Explorer was also the only one designed to be able to fly into the stratosphere, although no high-altitude flight tests were ever attempted to confirm its performance. It was also to include components such as transponder and satellite internet connection devices that are optional for the Pioneer. It was to have a larger wingspan, more solar cells and longer endurance. The selling price was advertised as $140,000.

=== Pioneer ===
Pioneer was advertised to have lower overall performance than the Explorer but greater maneuverability and rate of climb. It was to use the same ground station and the same connection protocol as the Explorer. It could be equipped with all the accessories of the Explorer, including transponder, satellite connection, 4K resolution gimbal camera, FLIR camera, deployable containers etc.

== Specifications ==
=== AirStrato Explorer ===
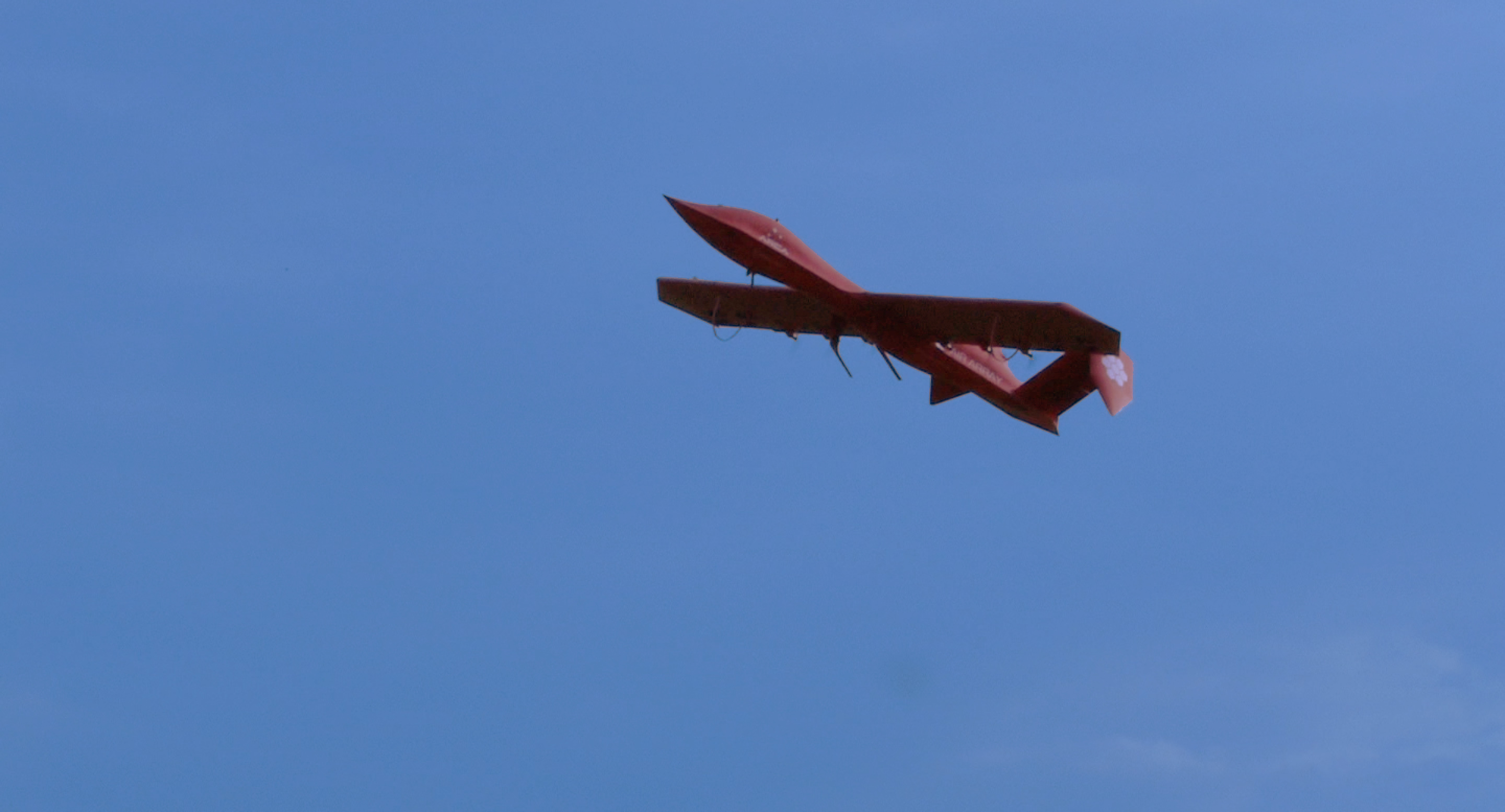
AirStrato prototype 002 in flight

Data from ARCA

General characteristics

- Crew: 0
- Length: 23 ft 1 in (7.0 m)
- Wingspan: 52 ft 6 in (16 m)
- Wing area: 206.7 sq ft (19.2 m^{2})
- Empty weight: 408 lb (185 kg)
- Gross weight: 507 lb (230 kg)
- Powerplant: 6 × Robbe 8085/10 Electric motor, 44 lbf (0.20 kN) thrust each

Performance

- Maximum speed: 106 mph (170 km/h, 92 kn)
- Cruise speed: 95 mph (152 km/h, 83 kn)
- Range: 520 mi (900 km, 450 nmi)
- Endurance: 20 hours (variable depending on sunlight)
- Service ceiling: 60,000 ft (18,000 m)
- Rate of climb: 590 ft/min (3 m/s)

=== AirStrato Pioneer ===
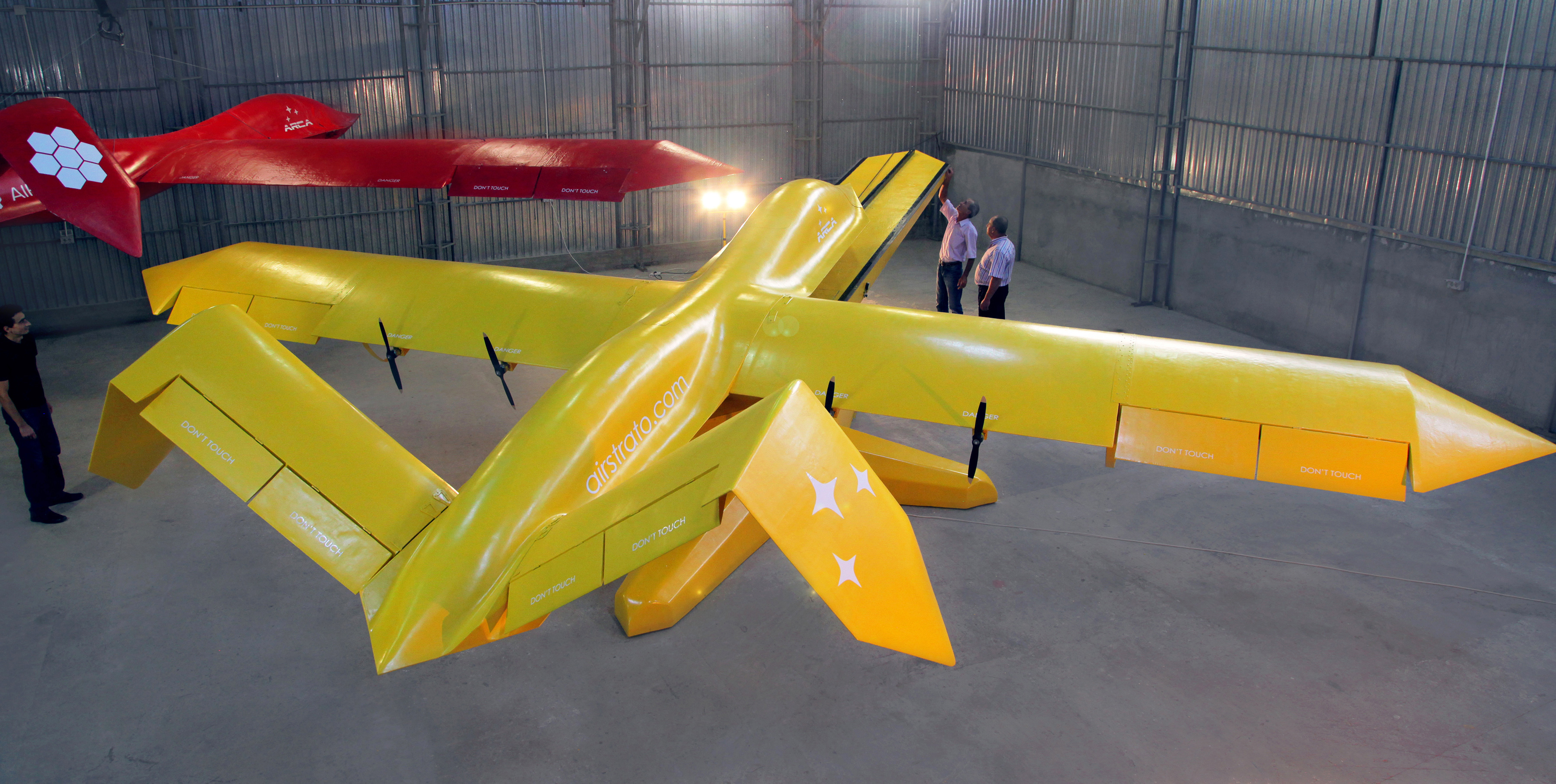
AirStrato prototypes 002 and 003 inside hangar

Data from ARCA

General characteristics

- Crew: 0
- Length: 23 ft 1 in (7.0 m)
- Wingspan: 39 ft 5 in (12 m)
- Wing area: 149 sq ft (13.8 m^{2})
- Empty weight: 375 lb (175 kg)
- Gross weight: 485 lb (220 kg)
- Powerplant: 6 × Robbe 8085/10 Electric motor, 44 lbf (0.20 kN) thrust each

Performance

- Maximum speed: 74 mph (120 km/h, 64 kn)
- Cruise speed: 62 mph (100 km/h, 54 kn)
- Range: 310 mi (500 km, 270 nmi)
- Endurance: 12 hours (variable depending on sunlight)
- Service ceiling: 26,000 ft (8,000 m)
- Rate of climb: 590 ft/min (3 m/s)
