= Elektro-Slovenija =

Elektro-Slovenija ELES
- Company type: Limited liability company (d.o.o.)
- Industry: Electricity
- Founded: 1991
- Founder: Government of Slovenia
- Headquarters: Ljubljana, Slovenia
- Services: Electric power transmission
- Owner: Government of Slovenia
- Website: www.eles.si

Elektro-Slovenija, d.o.o. (ELES) is a state-owned electricity transmission company of Slovenia. The company was founded in 1991 by the Government of Slovenia. It is the only power transmission system operator in the country. ELES operates the network of 400 kV, 220 kV and 110 kV transmission lines with a total length of 2,587 km (1,607 mi). Effective October 2, 2023, the distribution network company SODO d.o.o. has been merged into ELES, thus ELES is now also the distribution network operator. The managing director of the company is Aleksander Mervar.

ELES is a member of the European Network of Transmission System Operators for Electricity (ENTSO-E).

== See also ==
- Holding Slovenske elektrarne
