= Eles, Tunisia =

Eles اللاس
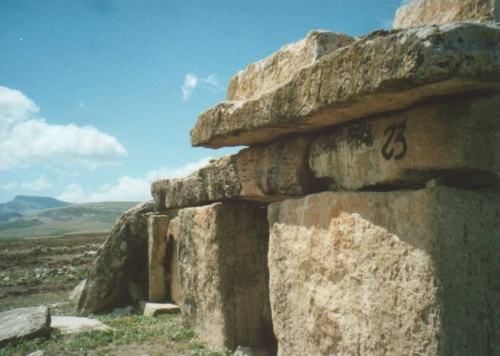
- Eles is the site of a large number of megalithic dolmens

- Location in Tunisia
- Coordinates: 35°56′55″N 9°5′50″E
- Country: Tunisia
- Governorate: Siliana Governorate
- Time zone: UTC1 (CET)

Eles (also transliterated as Ellès and Al Las) is a village in the Siliana Governorate, Tunisia. It is located around 35°56′55″N 9°5′50″E, about 13 km northwest of Maktar in Siliana Governorate.

Eles, Tunisia sits over a natural spring at the base of the surrounding hills.

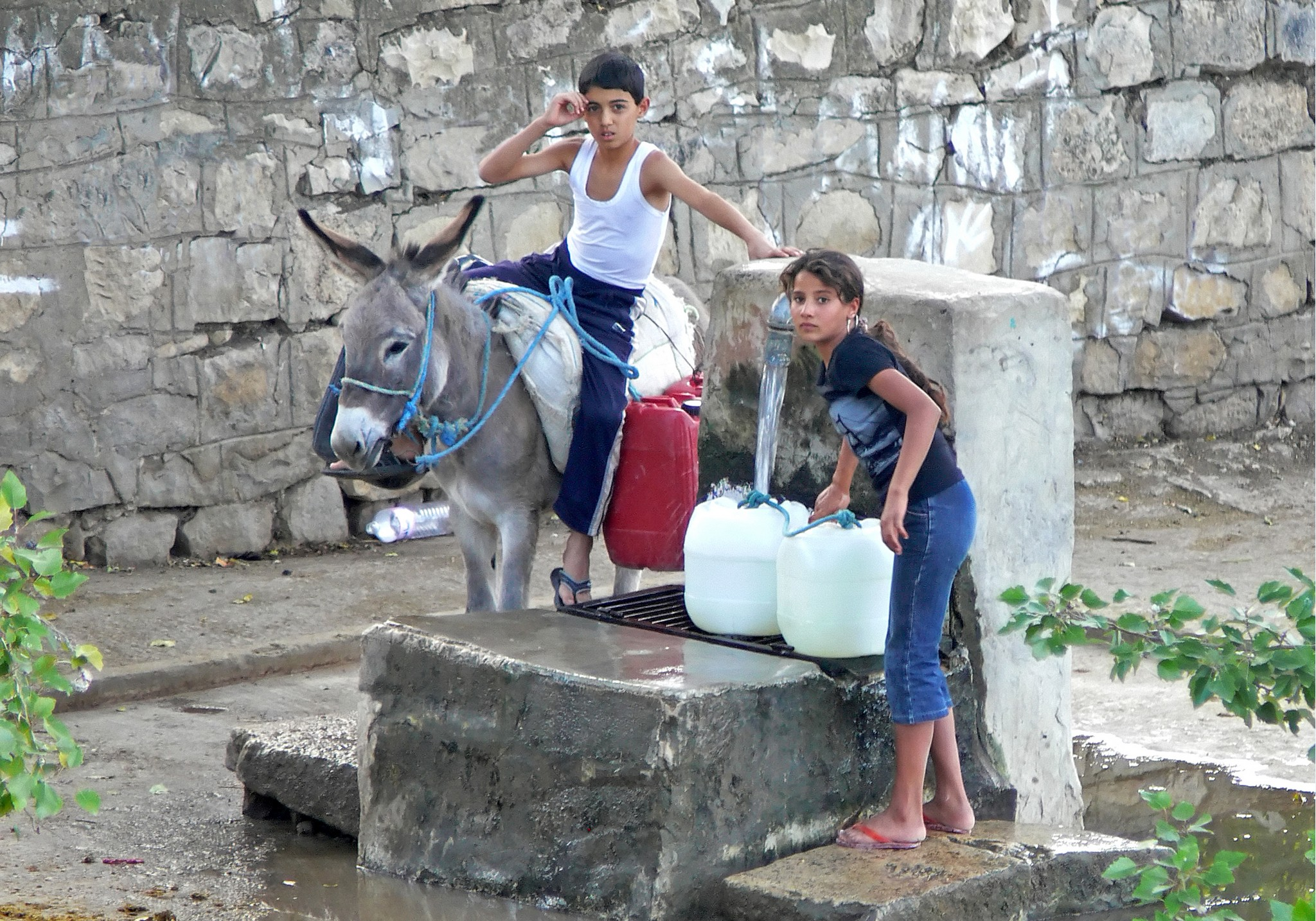
kids at the Spring : Eles village, Tunisia, North Africa

The village is notable for the large number of dolmens found immediately to the west, thought to be from around 2500 BC. BC. south and east of the village which are typical of the tombs found around Maktar. A study of fifty-three of the dolmens by Belmonte, Esteban and Jiménez González suggest that some of these tombs may be orientated towards Alpha Centauri. In contrast Hoskin argues that Tunisian dolmen orientations can be explained by the local topography, in that the entrances all face downhill.

The local rock strata are geologically interesting as they provide a particularly good record of the Cretaceous–Paleogene boundary, which is now better known as the Cretaceous–Paleogene extinction event.

During the Roman Empire and late antiquity there was a civitas (Roman town) called Ululi.

== General and cited references ==
- Belmonte, J.A.; Esteban C. & Jiménez González, J.J. (1998). "Pre-Roman Tombs of Africa Proconsularis". Archaeoastronomy: Supplement to the Journal for the History of Astronomy. 23 (29): S7–S24. doi:10.1177/002182869802902302. S2CID 118536392.
- Coccioni, R.; Marsilia, A. (November 2007). "The response of benthic foraminifera to the K–Pg boundary biotic crisis at Elles (north-western Tunisia)". Palaeogeography, Palaeoclimatology, Palaeoecology. 255 (1–2): 157–180. doi:10.1016/j.palaeo.2007.02.046. hdl:11576/1879920.
- Hoskin, M. (2001). Tombs, Temples, and Their Orientations: A New Perspective on Mediterranean Prehistory. Ocarina Books. ISBN 0-9540867-1-6.
- Harbi-Riahi, M.; Gragueb, A.; Camps, G.; M'Timet, A.; Zoughlami, J. (1985). Atlas Préhistorique de la Tunisie (8 Maktar). Institut National d'Archéologie et d'Art de Tunis and École Français de Rome. ISBN 2-7283-0091-7.
