= ARCAspace =

Aerospace company headquartered in Romania

- Type: Private
- Industry: Aerospace and Asteroid Mining
- Founded: 1999; 27 years ago
- Headquarters: Râmnicu Vâlcea, Romania
- Key people: Dumitru Popescu (CEO)
- Website: arcaspace.com

Romanian Cosmonautics and Aeronautics Association (Romanian: Asociația Română pentru Cosmonautică și Aeronautică), also known as ARCAspace, is an aerospace company based in Râmnicu Vâlcea, Romania. It builds rockets, high-altitude balloons, and unmanned aerial vehicles.

It was founded in 1999 as a non-governmental organization in Romania by the Romanian engineer and entrepreneur Dumitru Popescu and other rocket and aeronautics enthusiasts. Since then, ARCA has launched two stratospheric rockets and four large-scale stratospheric balloons including a cluster balloon. It was awarded two governmental contracts with the Romanian government and one contract with the European Space Agency.

ARCASpace is currently developing several rocket systems, both orbital and suborbital, under the EcoRocket program. These vehicles include the CER rocket systems, the EcoRocket Demonstrator, Nano, 5 & Heavy, and the A1 strategic anti-ballistic interceptor. ARCA has yet to launch a vehicle above the Karman line, or sent a payload to orbit, with the majority of their projects having been abandoned due to various reasons, often including financial or regulatory constraints.

== History ==
=== 1999–2004: Demonstrator rocket family ===
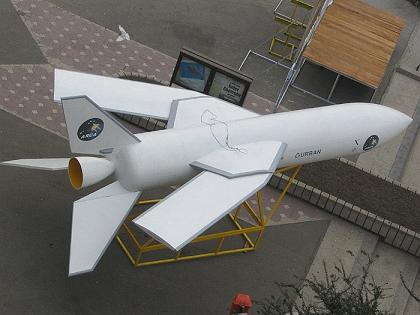
Orizont suborbital vehicle

ARCA was established as Romanian Cosmonautics and Aeronautics Association (Romanian: Asociația Română pentru Cosmonautică și Aeronautică), a non-governmental organization in 1999 by Dumitru Popescu and other rocket and aeronautics enthusiasts. Their goal was to construct and launch space rockets. After experimenting with designs for different fuels and rocket engine types, including solid fuel rockets, they decided to use fiberglass for engine and tank construction and hydrogen peroxide as fuel. Their first vehicle was named Demonstrator and was a 10 metres (33 ft) long, unguided, self-stabilized rocket. It never flew, instead it was used in various public exhibitions to attract funds and sponsorships. Their second rocket, Demonstrator 2, was constructed in 2003. For this, ARCA created their first rocket engine testing installation where they tested their hydrogen peroxide engine. After the tests were successful, they constructed Demonstrator 2B which was an improved version of their previous rocket. It had a 4.5 m (15 ft) length and 0.77 m (2 ft 6 in) diameter and used an 18 m (59 ft) high launch pad.

In 2003 ARCA also signed up for the Ansari X Prize international competition and started design for the Orizont suborbital vehicle capable of carrying a crew of two up to an altitude of 100 km (62 mi). Orizont was to be ARCA's competing vehicle for the Ansari X Prize. It was designed to use a disposable jet engine up to an altitude of 15 km (9.3 mi) and then ignite its main hydrogen peroxide rocket engine in order to propel it to the 100 km (62 mi) altitude.

On September 9, 2004, ARCA successfully launched the Demonstrator 2B rocket from Cape Midia Air Force Base. Because of powerful wind gusts up to 60 km/h (37 mph), they were forced to use only 20 percent of the intended fuel quantity in order to keep with the allocated safety zone by the Air Force. The altitude reached was 1,200 m (3,900 ft). 90 journalists from Romania, Germany, and Austria were present at the launch. After the launch, ARCA started construction of the Orizont spaceplane and completed the aircraft structure by 2005.

=== 2005–2010: Stabilo and Helen rockets ===
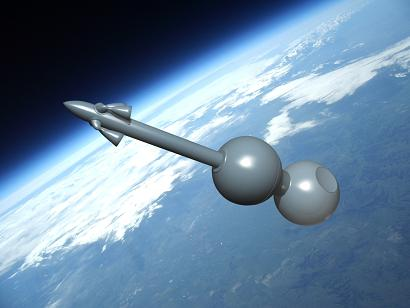
Artist rendition of the Stabilo rocket

ARCA organized a public presentation of their Orizont spaceplane in front of the Palace of the Parliament in Bucharest. Because of financial problems encountered with the construction of Orizont, ARCA decided to suspend its development and instead design a new, much smaller rocket called Stabilo. It was designed to be launched from a stratospheric solar balloon and carry one person into space. Design and construction of large scale polyethylene balloons started and on December 2, 2006, at Onesti, Bacau, the crew capsule of Stabilo rocket was lifted to an altitude of 14,700 m. The capsule was safely recovered that evening. The event was transmitted live on several Romanian TV stations.

On 27 September 2007, the entire Stabilo rocket (crew capsule + rocket booster) was lifted to an altitude of 12,000 m using the largest solar balloon constructed until that date. The mission was launched from Cape Midia Air Force Base, and the rocket was recovered from the Black Sea surface by Romanian Navy divers. At this moment ARCA proved its ability to conduct large-scale operations and to coordinate military institutions like the Romanian Navy and the Romanian Air Force.

In 2007 ARCA won two governmental contracts with the Research Ministry for a suborbital rocket and a solar balloon. The Romanian Space Agency, the University of Bucharest and other Romanian institutions were subcontractors to ARCA for these projects.

In early 2008 ARCA joined the Google Lunar X Prize competition and designed the Haas orbital launcher. Their lunar rover was named European Lunar Lander and used a monopropellant rocket engine for landing and hovering. Haas was a three-stage orbital rocket powered by hybrid engines using a bitumen-based fuel and hydrogen peroxide as oxidizer. It was supposed to be launched from 18,000 m carried by the largest solar balloon ever constructed, having a volume of 2 million cubic meters. For the Haas rocket, they created a three-stage much smaller demonstrator called Helen that was intended to test technologies and operation. The Helen rocket was intentionally not aerodynamically stabilized, being intended to use a technique based on the pendulum rocket fallacy. The Romanian bank BRD – Groupe Société Générale awarded ARCA a 300,000 euro sponsorship for their activities. Romanian cosmonaut Dumitru Prunariu highly praised ARCA's achievements and noted their ability to efficiently utilize private funds. In 2009 ARCA performed a series of engine tests using the Stabilo rocket engine in order to validate the design for the Helen rocket.

The first attempt to launch the Helen rocket took place on November 14, 2009. Romanian Naval Forces participated with the NSSL 281 Constanta ship, the Venus divers ship, the Fulgerul fast boat and two other fast craft boats. For this mission, ARCA constructed a massive 150,000 cubic meter solar balloon, approximately five times as large as their previous balloon. After the balloon began inflating, the mission crew discovered that the balloon inflation arms were wrapped around the lower part of the balloon. Inflation was halted and the crew attempted to unwrap the arms. Three hours later the arms were repositioned and inflation was ready to resume but the sun was already nearing the horizon, and heating the solar balloon was no longer possible. The decision was made to cancel the mission.

ARCA decided to redesign the Helen rocket to use two stages and a helium balloon instead. They named the rocket Helen 2. On April 27, 2010, they performed an avionics test for the European Lunar Lander payload to be lifted by the Helen 2 rocket, using a hot air balloon that lifted three ARCA members to 5,200 m altitude. On August 4, 2010, a new attempt to launch the rocket was made, but a construction error in the helium balloon caused it to rupture and the mission was aborted. A new helium balloon was manufactured designed to carry only the second stage of Helen 2 rocket. On October 1, 2010, the rocket performed a successful flight to an altitude of 38,700 m reaching a maximum velocity of 2320 km/h. Upon atmospheric reentry the rocket capsule parachute failed to deploy and the capsule was lost at sea, but the data was transmitted to the mission control center on the 281 Constanta ship and to the Romanian Air Traffic Services Administration.

=== 2011–2013: IAR-111 aircraft, Executor engine and Haas rocket family ===
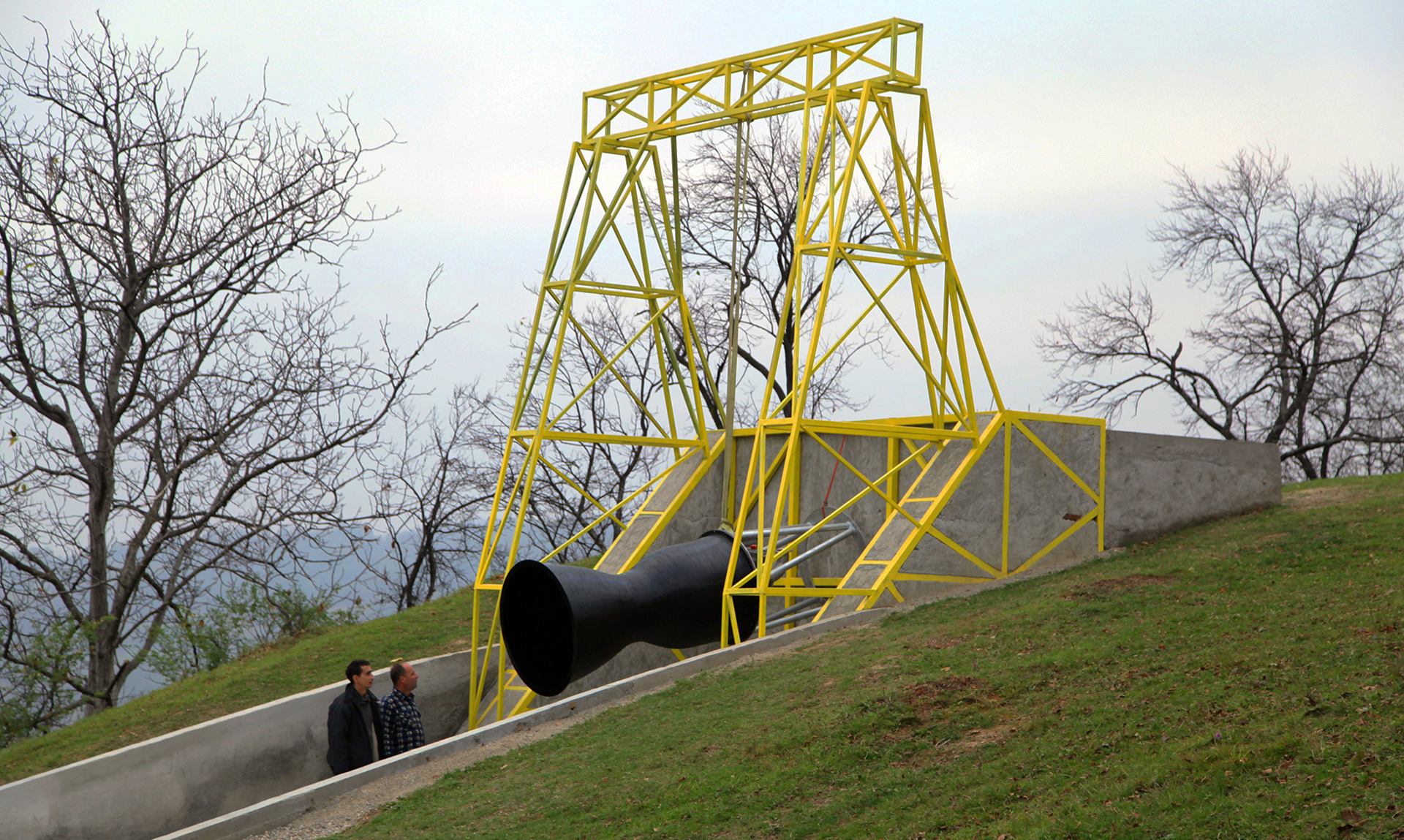
Executor rocket engine

After the difficulties encountered with the stratospheric balloons, ARCA decided to change their approach to orbital launch for the Google Lunar X Prize. They designed a supersonic rocket plane powered by a liquid-fueled rocket engine using kerosene as fuel and liquid oxygen as oxidizer. The aircraft, initially named E-111, was renamed IAR-111 after ARCA received permission from IAR S.A. Brasov to use the traditional IAR designation for military and civilian aircraft constructed since 1925. The aircraft was intended to fly to an altitude of 17.000 m and launch a heavily modified version of the Haas rocket, named Haas 2. Haas 2 was an air-launched three-stage orbital rocket intended to place a 200 kg payload into orbit. Work on the plane structure began in late 2010.

By 2011 all the fiberglass molds for the aircraft were finished and one-third of the aircraft structure was completed. The crew capsule escape system was tested on September 26, 2011, when a Mil Mi-17 helicopter belonging to the Special Aviation Unit dropped the capsule from an altitude of 700 m over the Black Sea. The emergency parachute deployed successfully and the capsule was recovered from the sea surface by the Romanian Coast Guard.

In 2012 ARCA decided to focus on the construction of the rocket engine of the IAR-111 aircraft. The engine, named Executor, is made of composite materials, has a thrust of 24 tons force (52,000 lbf) and is turbopump fueled. It uses ablative cooling for the main chamber and nozzle where the outer layers of the composite material vaporize in contact with the high temperature exhaust mixture and prevent overheating. ARCA also presented a long-term space program, until 2025, that besides IAR-111 envisioned a small scale orbital rocket (Haas 2C), a suborbital crewed rocket (Haas 2B) and a medium scale crewed orbital rocket (Super Haas). In March 2012, ARCA tested an extremely lightweight composite materials kerosene tank that is intended to be used for the Haas 2C rocket.

After criticism from the Romanian Space Agency (ROSA) intensified in printed media and television, ARCA decided to send a public letter to the Romanian Prime Minister to intervene in this matter. ARCA mentioned that the Romanian Space Agency is in no position to criticize after the failure of their cubesat Goliat recently launched with a Vega rocket. Furthermore, ARCA was privately funded compared with ROSA which uses public funding.

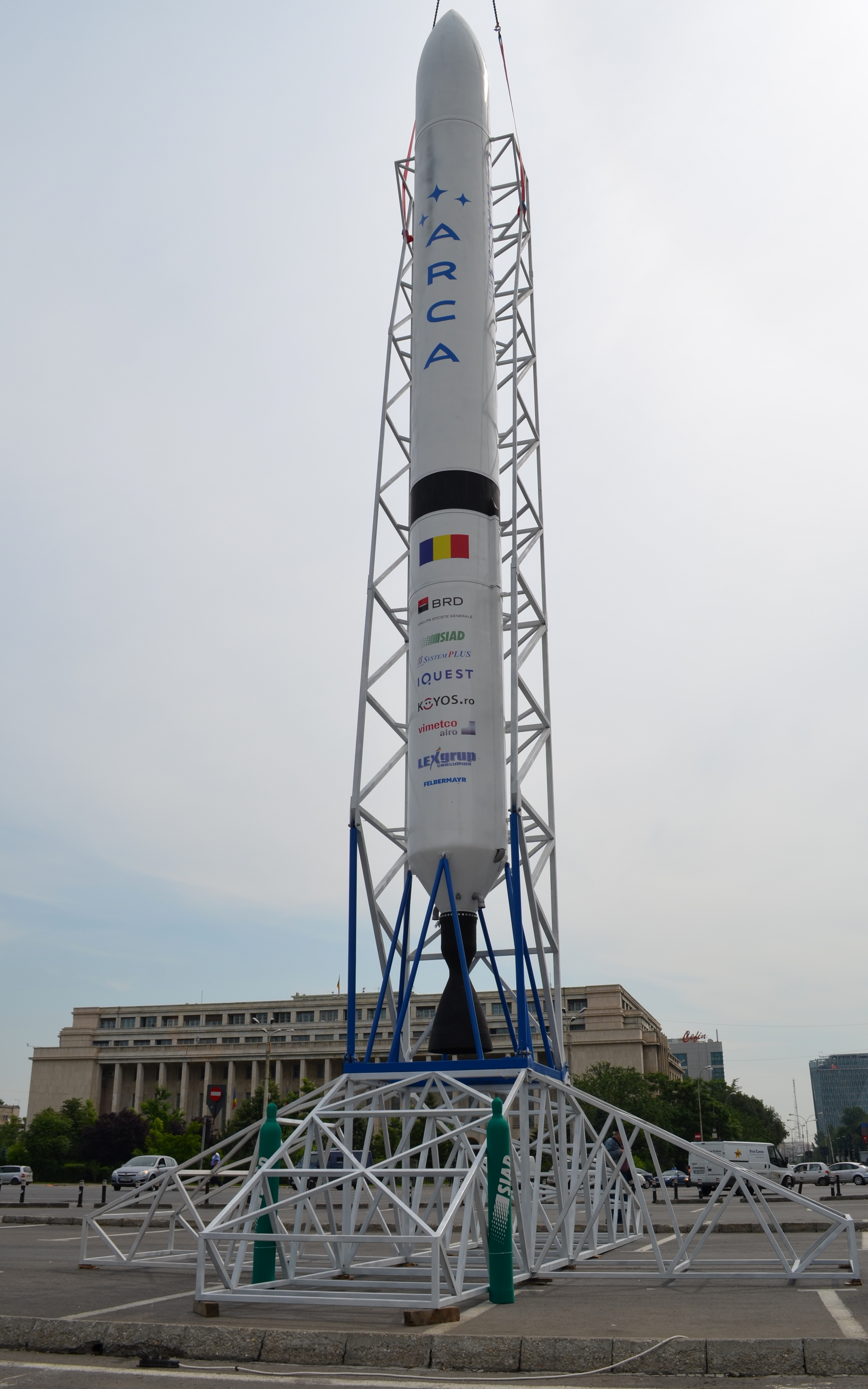
Haas 2C rocket in Victoria Square, Bucharest

In June 2012 ARCA presented their Haas 2C rocket in Victoria Square in Bucharest, in front of the Romanian Government palace. The same year ARCA won a $1,200,000 contract with the European Space Agency to participate in the ExoMars program. Named the High Altitude Drop Test, the contract consisted of a series of stratospheric balloon drop tests to verify the structural integrity of the EDM parachutes used in Martian atmospheric deceleration.

On September 16, 2013, ARCA performed the first successful flight in the ExoMars program, lifting three pressurised avionics containers over the Black Sea to an altitude of 24,400 m. In November, the concrete test stand for the Executor engine was completed.

=== 2014–2019: AirStrato to Launch Assist System ===
On February 10 ARCA presented a high-altitude uncrewed aerial vehicle, named AirStrato, that was meant to replace stratospheric balloon usage for equipment testing and other near space missions. It was intended to be solar powered for extended endurance, was 7 m in length and had a 16 m wingspan with a takeoff weight of 230 kg. The aircraft first flew on February 28. ARCA announced that if the development was successful they would consider developing a commercial version available for sale to customers.

On October 17, 2014, ARCA announced that it had transferred its headquarters to the United States to Las Cruces, New Mexico. In a press release they announced that in Romania activities related to software and rocket engine development will continue. They also announced that Air Strato UAV would be available for purchase to customers and that Las Cruces will also serve as a production center for the aircraft. On November 25 they released a website for the UAV revealing two models available for purchase, AirStrato Explorer that could reach altitudes up to 18,000 m with 20 hours endurance and AirStrato Pioneer that would be limited to 8000 m and 12 hours endurance.

On July 13, 2015 ARCA announced the beginning of activities in New Mexico, including production and flight tests of AirStrato UAS and Haas rockets, investing US$1.2 million.

In November 2017, CEO Dimitru Popescu was arrested and charged with 12 counts of fraud. As a result, he left the country and reestablished operations in Romania. The charges were later dropped.

In early 2019, ARCA announced the development of the steam-powered Launch Assist System and began testing the aerospike engine.

=== 2020–Present: EcoRocket, AMi, and Pivot to Asteroid Mining ===
In 2020, tests of the steam-powered aerospike continued and ARCA announced a new launch vehicle, the EcoRocket, derived from the LAS technology.

In 2021, the EcoRocket design was altered slightly to a three-stage vehicle as tests of the steam-powered aerospike continued.

In 2022, ARCA announced the AMi Exploration Initiative, effectively pivoting its business model away from the commercial launch sector and towards cryptocurrency and asteroid mining. The AMi program will utilize the AMi Cargo vehicle and EcoRocket Heavy to mine valuable materials from asteroids. Beginning in the late 2020s, the company plans to start a series of asteroid mining missions to return valuable metals (mostly platinum) to Earth for sale. It intends to fund this venture primarily through the sales of the AMi token, an upcoming cryptocurrency on the Ethereum blockchain. Since then, it appears ARCA is shifting its main focus away from AMi, and towards the CER/military-related programs.

== Vehicles ==
=== Haas rocket family ===
The Haas rocket family was to be a series of rockets of various sizes and configurations intended to replace the initial Haas balloon-launched rocket. After the difficulties encountered with balloon operation in Mission 3 and Mission 4, ARCA decided to redesign the rocket to be ground-launched. Although heavier and more expensive, ground-launched rockets are more reliable, easier to operate and can carry heavier payloads into orbit.

==== Haas 2B ====
Haas 2B was to be a single-stage suborbital rocket intended for space tourism. It was designed to transport a crew capsule and service module into a suborbital trajectory. The crew capsule and service module would have been the same as the ones used for the larger multi-stage Super Haas orbital rocket. At the NASA DC-X conference in Alamogordo, New Mexico in August 2013 ARCA presented an updated version of the Haas 2B rocket with a capsule capable of carrying a crew of five into space. There were discussions with Spaceport America representatives to operate the Haas 2B rocket from New Mexico.

==== Haas 2C ====
Haas 2C was to be an orbital rocket intended for commercial payload launches. There were two planned variants of the rocket, a single stage to orbit variant capable of placing a 50 kg (110 lb) payload into orbit and a two-stage variant capable of lifting a 400 kg (880 lb) payload into orbit. After testing the extremely lightweight composite tank, ARCA designed a single stage 18 m (59 ft 1 in) long rocket with a total weight of 510 kg (1,120 lb), having a thrust-to-weight ratio of 26:1 and a 50 kg (110 lb) payload. The company displayed the rocket in Victoria Square in Bucharest, in front of the Romanian Government building. The second stage version was to be powered by the Executor engine for the lower stage, and the upper stage use a smaller engine adapted for vacuum, named Venator.

==== Haas 2CA ====
Haas 2CA was to be a rocket designed to be able to launch 100 kg into a low-Earth orbit, at a price of US$1 million per launch. The first flight was intended to launch from Wallops Flight Facility in 2018. The rocket was designed as a Single-stage-to-orbit (SSTO) and featured an Aerospike engine, producing 50,500 pounds-force (225 kN) of thrust at sea level and 73,800 pounds-force (328 kN) of thrust in vacuum.

=== IAR-111 rocket plane ===
Romanian Aeronautical Industry Brașov (Romanian: Industria Aeronautica Romana Brașov), also known as IAR-111, was a sea-launched suborbital rocket plane. It used the same Executor engine as Haas 2B and 2C rockets. It was to have a length of 24 m (78 ft 9 in), a wingspan of 12 m (39 ft 4 in) and a take-off mass of 19 tonnes (42,000 lb). It can carry a crew of two, a pilot and a passenger. The flight sequence consists of take-off from sea surface, horizontal flight at subsonic speed, followed by a rapid climb to an altitude of 16,000 m (52,000 ft) in approximately two minutes. As a space tourism development platform, it could reach Mach 2.6 (3,190 km/h; 1,980 mph) at 30,000 m (98,000 ft). After fuel depletion, IAR-111 was to descend in gliding flight and land on the sea surface. In case of emergency, the crew capsule was to be detachable and equipped with two rocket-propelled parachutes.

The IAR-111 capsule was flight tested during Mission 6. The mission took place in cooperation with the Special Aviation Unit and the Coast Guard, belonging to the Ministry of Internal Affairs and Administration.

=== AirStrato unmanned aerial vehicle ===
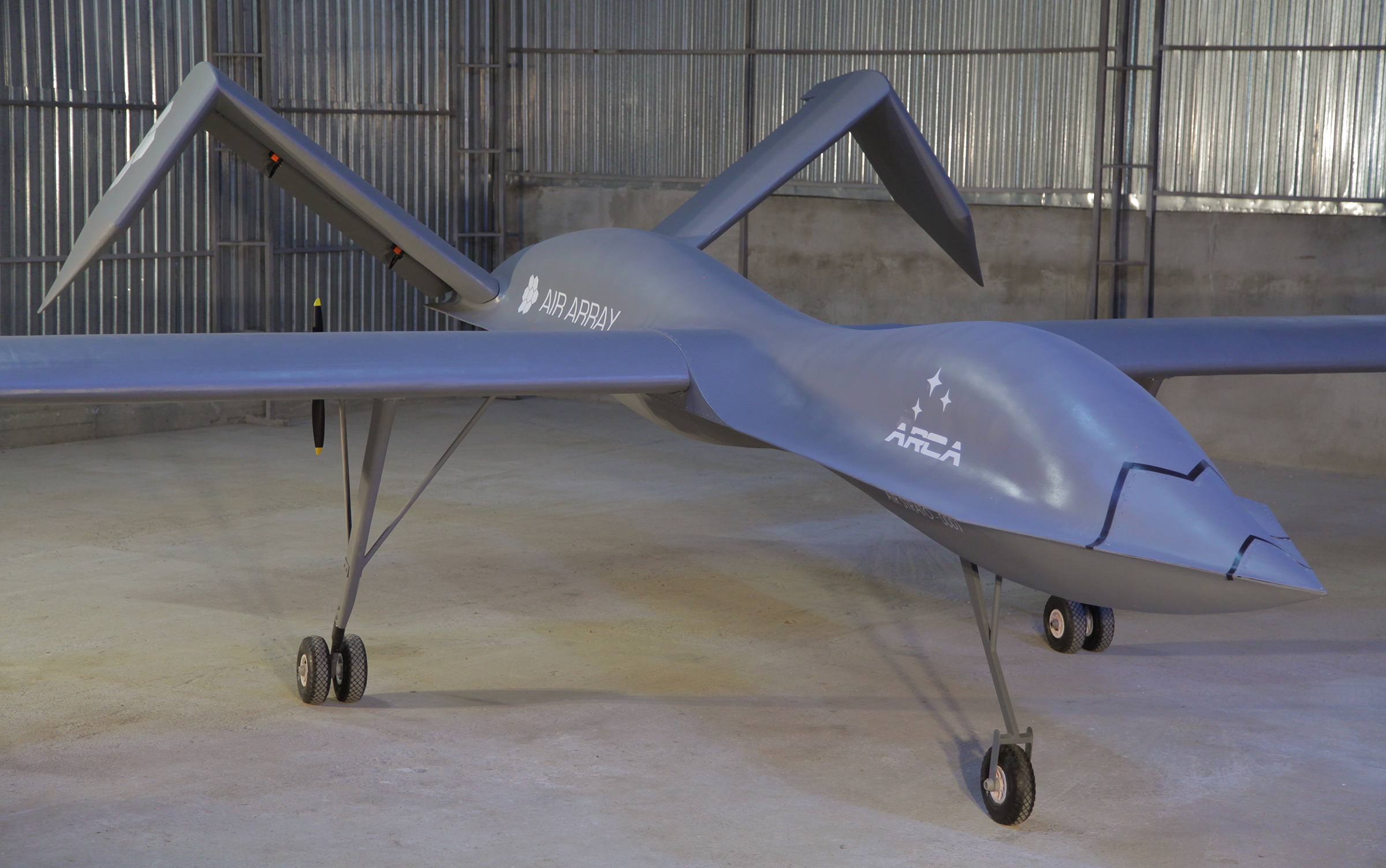
Air Strato electrical powered UAV

AirStrato was an electric powered medium-sized unmanned aerial vehicle that was being developed by ARCA. There were two variants planned, the AirStrato Explorer with a target flight ceiling of 18,000 m and AirStrato Pioneer with a target flight ceiling of 8000 m. It was supposed to carry a 45 kg payload consisting of surveillance equipment, scientific instruments, or additional battery pods for extended autonomy. The first prototype's maiden flight took place on February 28, 2014. It was equipped with fixed landing gear. Two more prototypes were constructed that lacked landing gear. Instead, ARCA opted for a pneumatic catapult as a launcher and landing skids and a recovery parachute for landing. Both prototypes only performed take-off and landing testing and short low-altitude flights.

=== ESA Drop Test Vehicle ===
ARCA has constructed a drop test vehicle for the European Space Agency intended to test the atmospheric deceleration parachutes for the ExoMars EDM lander module. It has the same weight and parachute deployment systems present on the ESA module. The DTV is intended to be lifted to an altitude of 24 km by a stratospheric helium balloon. From that height, it will fall freely reaching a dynamic pressure similar to that encountered by the ExoMars EDM at entry into the Mars atmosphere. At that dynamic pressure the parachute will deploy and the module will land on the Black Sea surface and will be recovered by the Romanian Naval Forces.

=== EcoRocket Demonstrator ===
The EcoRocket Demonstrator (formerly just EcoRocket) is a partially-reusable three-stage orbital launch vehicle currently under development. The EcoRocket Demonstrator had been slated to launch in 2022, however, no launch took place that year. The vehicle's reusable first stage will use a battery-powered steam rocket to propel a small second stage to an altitude of 7 kilometers. The second stage will then proceed to a higher altitude to deploy a smaller third stage, carrying the payload. The third stage utilizes RP-1 and high test peroxide to propel a payload of up to 10 kilograms into orbit. The rocket takes its name from the claimed ecological benefits of not burning as much kerosene (despite using kerosene to achieve most of orbital velocity). The EcoRocket will launch partially submerged in the Black Sea, in a similar manner to the Sea Dragon. Both the first and second stages are intended to be reusable, parachuting back into the ocean for recovery. The vehicle is intended to demonstrate technologies for the upcoming EcoRocket Heavy. As of mid-2024, ARCA announced the reactivation of the Demonstrator program, and has begun work on the refurbishment of a first stage tank to support at least one flight test.

=== EcoRocket Heavy ===
The EcoRocket Heavy is a planned variant of EcoRocket, designed to support ARCA's AMi asteroid mining initiative. Announced in 2022, the EcoRocket heavy will be a three-stage launch vehicle derived from EcoRocket's technology. The stages will be arranged concentrically around the payload in the center (in a layout occasionally called "onion staging"), with the outermost stage firing, then detaching and allowing the next outermost stage to ignite, and so on. The EcoRocket heavy, like the EcoRocket, will use a three-stage design, with the first two stages using steam power and the final stage using a kerosene/liquid oxygen mixture to propel itself to orbit. Each stage will consist of multiple "propulsion modules" attached together, which the CEO Popescu describes as being inspired by the now-defunct German launch company OTRAG. The vehicle will be thirty meters in diameter, and, like the EcoRocket Demonstrator, will launch from the ocean, and be partially reusable, recovering the first two stages. The EcoRocket Heavy abandons aerospike engines, using only traditional rocket nozzles.

=== AMi Cargo ===
The AMi Cargo vehicle is the vehicle designed to support ARCA's asteroid mining operations, and as the primary payload for the EcoRocket Heavy. The AMi Cargo vehicle will approach an asteroid, and then release the battery-powered Recovery Capsule (which, in the first iteration, appeared to be derived from the earlier suborbital capsule for the Haas 2B), which will use the engine on its service module to approach the target asteroid. The spacecraft will then harpoon the asteroid, then reel itself in to begin mining operations. Upon completion of mining, it will return to the AMi Cargo vehicle, which will propel it back to Earth. Upon reaching Earth, the capsule will detach and jettison the service module prior to reentry. The capsule will then perform a high-velocity landing at sea, without the use of a parachute, relying on the structural integrity of the 7-meter diameter heat shield on the front of the return capsule for safe recovery of the material inside. A subscale demonstration of this technique was performed in October 2023, using a manned hot air balloon during Mission 12, carried out alongside the RTV’s Mission 16. ARCA intends to eventually upgrade the spacecraft for uncrewed missions to other planets. To support deep space operations, ARCA intends to construct their own Deep Space Network, akin to NASA's system.

=== A1 Interceptor ===
The A1 is a strategic anti-ballistic interceptor system, based on the EcoRocket technology, announced in December 2023. The commercially available vehicle comes in two versions; the A1A & A1B. The basic premise and interception method of the vehicle consists of a 6-10 metric ton device (referred to as the “warhead”) carrying between 200,000-2,000,000 metal pellets, chaff, and flares, all of which are “electromechanically” deployed. Following the deployment of the warhead, the enemy ICBM, IRBM, CM, HM, or other form of conventional or nuclear weapon, impacts the dome, cloud, or dome sector created by the warhead. The impact either compromises the enemy weapon’s airframe, deceives and deviates it from the target, or destroying it before reaching the target. As of May 2024, ARCA has constructed one A1 vehicle, and plans to launch it on a demonstration flight in August 2024. ARCA has stated that the interception method was tested and/or demonstrated by the US government under the “Star Wars” program in the 1980s.

=== Commercial EcoRocket ===
While the organization’s main focus remains on the development of the EcoRocket orbital launchers, they have begun work on several other systems, in order to generate technical data and revenue for the AMi program’s hardware. The Commercial EcoRocket, or CER, is a series of 10 suborbital rockets, including the two A1 interceptor variants. The series consists of the CER-160, CER-500, CER-1200, the RTV & MIRTV, and the Target Rocket (“TR”) versions of all three vehicles. The CER-160 is the smallest vehicle in the series, with the 1200 being the largest. The civilian CER-160 is capable of reaching 20 kilometers in altitude, with a maximum speed of Mach 1.9, all while carrying a payload of up to 3 kilograms. The CER-500 rocket reaches 30 km and Mach 2.1, with a payload of 100 kg. Finally, the CER-1200 is able to reach 40 km and Mach 2.6 with a 1,000 kg payload. All civilian CER rockets launch from “canisters” (akin to silos) proportional to the rocket size. The Target Rocket versions of all 3 vehicles are available only to military customers, and feature canister angle support to allow for various firing angles, to alter the vehicle’s flight parameters. The RTV (Reentry Target Vehicle) & MIRTV (Multiple Independent Reentry Target Vehicles) are products designed to simulate the terminal flight of ballistic missiles, allowing for military forces to train their anti-missile systems in a cost-effect way. Both the RTV and MIRTV are launched by the CER-1200 rocket, though modified to feature an upper “booster” stage. ARCA proposes these products as alternatives to the expensive option of firing a real, but inert missile/weapon to train interception forces. The A1 is being developed and sold under the CER program.

== Rocket engines ==
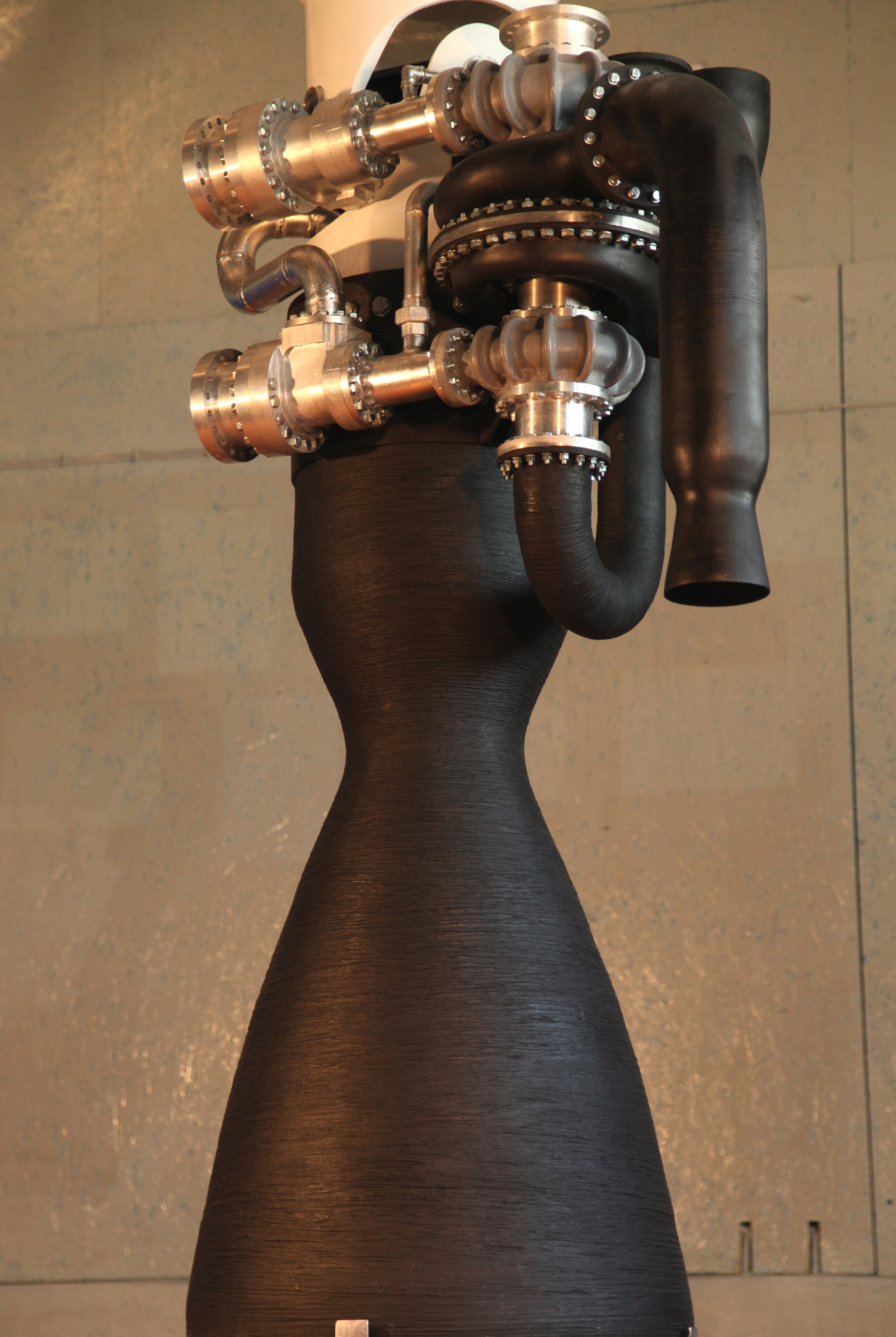
Executor rocket engine.

=== Executor ===
The Executor was a liquid-fueled rocket engine intended to power the IAR-111 Excelsior supersonic plane and Haas 2B and 2C rockets. Executor was an open cycle gas generator rocket engine, that uses liquid oxygen and kerosene and has a maximum thrust of 24 tons force. ARCA decided to use composite materials and aluminum alloys on a large scale. The composite materials offer low construction costs and reduced weight of the components. They were used in the construction of the combustion chamber and the nozzle, and also the gas generator and some elements in the turbopumps. The combustion chamber and the nozzle are built from two layers. The internal layer is made of silica fiber and phenolic resin, and the external one is made of carbon fiber and epoxy resin. The phenolic resin reinforced with silica fiber pyrolyzes endothermally in the combustion chamber walls, releasing gases like oxygen and hydrogen, leaving a local carbon matrix. The gases spread through the carbon matrix and reach the internal surface of the wall where they meet the hot combustion gases and act as a cooling agent. Furthermore, the engine is equipped with a cooling system that injects 10 percent of the total kerosene mass onto the internal walls.

The pump volutes were made of 6062 type aluminum alloy. The pump rotors are made through lathing and milling using 304 type steel. The supersonic turbine was made of refractory steel, both the core and the blades. The turbine rotation speed was 20,000 rpm and has a 1.5 MW power. The intake gas temperature was 620 °C. The main engine valves were made of 6060 type aluminum and were pneumatically powered, without adjustment. The engine injector and the liquid oxygen intake pipes were made of 304 L type steel and the kerosene intake pipe was made of composite materials. The engine had the possibility to shift the thrust by 5 degrees on two axes. The articulated system was made of composite materials and high-grade steel alloy. The engine is rotated using two hydraulic pistons that use kerosene from the pump exhaust system.

ARCA announced that the Executor engine had a thrust/mass ratio of 110.

=== Venator ===
Venator was a liquid-fueled pressure-fed rocket engine that will be used to power the second stage of the Haas 2C rocket. It burned liquid oxygen and kerosene and had a maximum thrust of 2.5 tonnes-force (25 kN; 5,500 lbf). The engine had no valves on the main pipes. Instead, it used burst disks on the main pipes, between the tanks and the engine. The second stage was pressurized at 2 atm (200 kPa) at lift-off and after the first stage burn-out, the second stage would be pressurized at 16 atm. At that pressure the disks would burst and the fuel would flow through the engine.

=== LAS ===
The Launch Assist System was an aerospike engine that was to use electrically heated water to produce steam, which would then generate thrust. The LAS was to reduce cost of rockets by manner of reducing the associated complexity, since steam powered rockets are far less complex than even the simplest liquid fueled engines. It was to be a self contained unit including both the engine and propellant tank. It could theoretically achieve a specific impulse of 67 seconds. The LAS was proposed to be a first stage for the Haas 2CA rocket, or to serve as a strap-on booster for existing vehicles, including the Atlas V, Falcon 9, Delta IV, and Ariane 6. The EcoRocket Demonstrator and Heavy will use a reworked version of this system with two nozzles (one for launch, and one for landing) called the LAS 25D.

=== AMi Cargo System ===
The AMi Cargo vehicle will use a new propulsion system, described by ARCA as "electric-arc propulsion." The reaction mass will be water, and the impulse will be provided electrically using electricity from large solar arrays. Beyond this, not much is known about the nature of this system, however, ARCA intends it to be capable of running for days on end.

=== Propulsion Module ===
The Propulsion Module (PM) is the specific rocket engine used by the first and second stages of the EcoRocket Heavy. Its propellant is water, which is heated and exits the nozzle as steam. The engine has a thrust of ~30 tons, using nearly 500 modules for the first two stages.

=== Universal Propulsion Module ===
The UPM is slightly different than the regular PM, in the ways it is employed. The UPM is derived from the PM and serves to the creation of the CER1200/TR/RTV/MIRTV, the A1 anti-ballistic interceptor, and other civilian rockets. It is the most powerful engine developed by ARCA.

== Missions ==
Flight	Program	Category	Altitude/destination	Ship configuration	Engine start	Status
First Flight	Demonstrator 2B	Uncrewed	1.000 m	Ground-launched rocket	Yes	Completed
Mission 1	Stabilo	Uncrewed	22.000 m	Carrier balloon + Crew cabin	No	Completed
Mission 2	Stabilo	Uncrewed	22.000 m	Carrier balloon + Complete ship	No	Completed
Mission 3	Lunar Project (Helen Test Rocket)	Uncrewed	100.000 m	Carrier balloon + Helen (3 stages)	Yes	Unsuccessful
Mission 4	Lunar Project (Helen 2 Test Rocket)	Uncrewed	100.000 m	Carrier balloon + Helen 2 (2 stages)	Yes	Unsuccessful
Mission 4B	Lunar Project (Helen 2 Test Rocket – single stage)	Uncrewed	40.000 m	Carrier balloon + Helen 2 (1 stage)	Yes	Completed
Mission 5	Avionics & TV transmission test	Crewed	5.000 m	Carrier balloon + Stage 1 (Helen 2) + ELL	No	Completed
Mission 6	Cabin drop safety test	Uncrewed	700 m	IAR-111 cabin (dropped by helicopter)	No	Completed
Mission 8	Equipment test (Propulsion and data transmission)	Uncrewed	Stratospheric	Payload with undisclosed rocket	Yes	Completed
WP3	ExoMars HADT avionics qualification test	Uncrewed	24,000 m	Pressurized gondola	No	Completed
CubeMessenger (BOREAS)	Space launch	Uncrewed	Orbital	Haas 2C	No	Program cancelled
Mission 7	Suborbital plane test	Crewed	16.000 m (?)	IAR-111	Yes	Program cancelled
Mission 9	VTOL test of EcoRocket	Uncrewed	<100m	EcoRocket	N/A	Cancelled
Mission 10	First orbital flight test of EcoRocket	Uncrewed	>100 KM	EcoRocket	N/A	Planned
Mission 11	Launch sequence test of CER-160TR	Uncrewed	<100m	EcoRocket Nano/CER-160TR	Yes	Successful
Mission 12	AMi capsule drop test	Uncrewed	~600m	Subscale AMi capsule demonstrator	N/A	Successful
Mission 13	Underwater engine test	Uncrewed	<300m	LAS-1	Yes	Successful
Mission 15	EcoRocket space launch	Uncrewed	180 km	EcoRocket 5 + Nano	N/A	Planned
Mission 16	RTV drop test	Uncrewed	~600m	RTV	N/A	Successful
Mission 17	Military homologation flight	Uncrewed	Unknown	CER-160TR	Yes	Successful
Mission 18	Military homologation flight	Uncrewed	Unknown	CER-160TR	Yes	Successful
Mission 19	Interceptor flight test	Uncrewed	>200m	A1A interceptor	Planned	Planned

=== Mission 1 ===
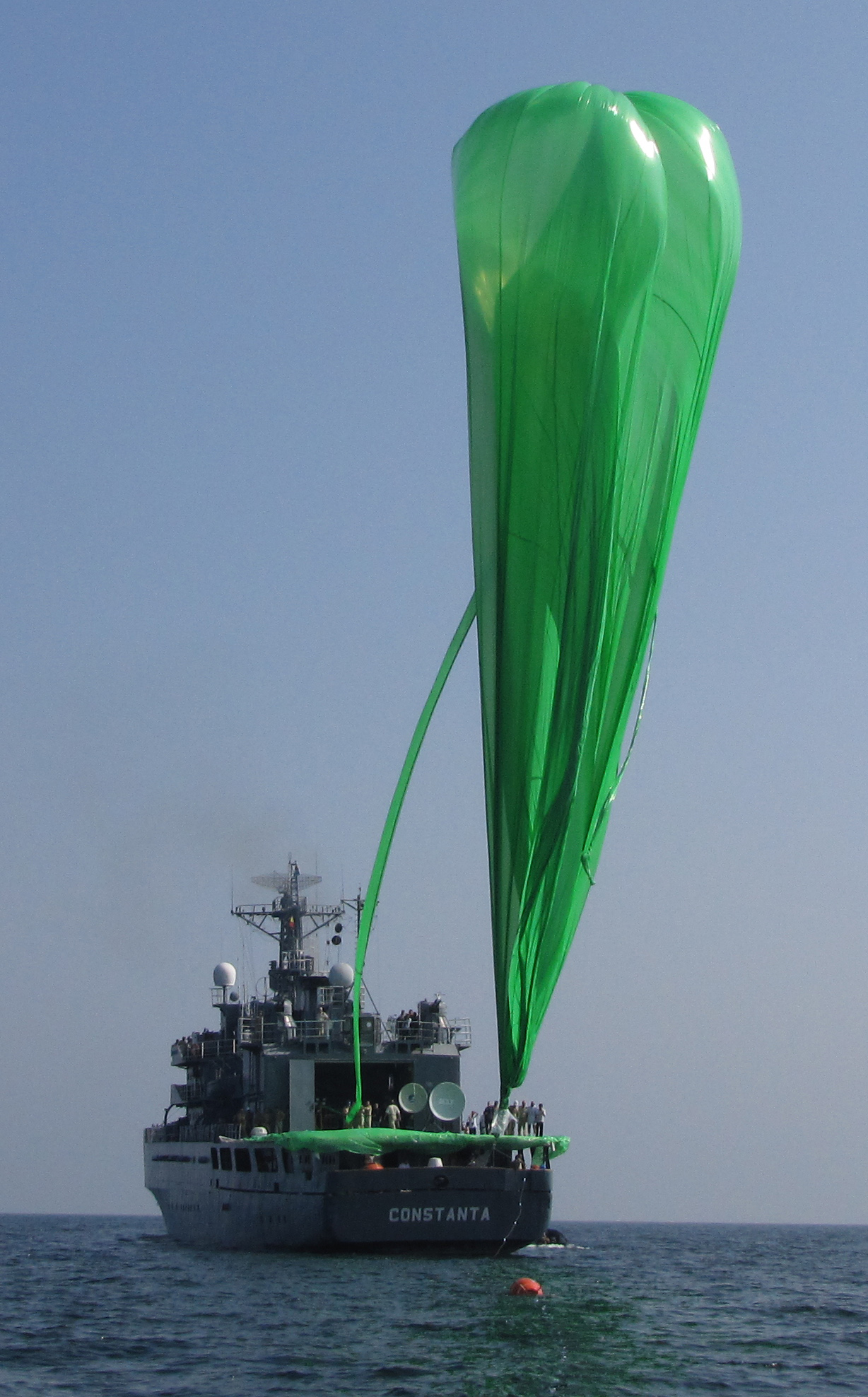
Helium balloon inflation on 281 Constanta warship belonging to Romanian Naval Forces

Mission 1 took place on December 2, 2006, when a solar balloon carried the STABILO system capsule to an altitude of 14,700 m (48,200 ft). The altitude was slightly lower than intended because of extreme turbulence encountered during the last stage of the flight. In light of this, it was decided not to risk damaging the system.

The flight had been planned since August 2006, when another large solar balloon was launched at low altitude in controlled flight. During this time a specially designed parachute was tested. It was the first stratospheric flight performed by ARCA, and the event was transmitted live; over 20 journalists were present.

=== Mission 2 ===
Mission 2 of STABILO 1B was launched on 27 September 2007 from Cape Midia Air Force Base. The Romanian Air Force participated with two radar stations. Civil Aviation and the Romanian Navy also participated, the latter with one naval diver's ship. The first and second vehicle stages reached an altitude of 12,000 m (39,000 ft). After one hour and 30 minutes and having traveled 30 km (19 mi) from the launch location, STABILO landed on the sea surface and was intercepted by a Navy Saturn ship and recovered by divers. The recovery ship was guided by the satellite transmission system and by Air Force radar. The vehicle was transported to the Navy shipyard. The electronic equipment continued to transmit to the command center even 8 hours after the flight had ended.

=== Mission 3, 4 and 4B ===
Helen was a demonstrator rocket for the Haas balloon-launched orbital rocket. It was intended to test in flight the avionics and gravitational stabilization method proposed for the much larger Haas rocket. Helen was intended to reach an altitude of 80 km (50 mi). Two versions were created, a three-stage rocket that had cylindrical tanks and used hydrogen peroxide as monopropellant fuel, and a two-stage spherical tank rocket that used the same propulsion type. The rocket used a physically flawed stabilization technique based on the pendulum rocket fallacy.

Mission 3 took place on November 14, 2009, on the Black Sea. Romanian Naval Forces participated in the mission with one logistical ship, one diver's ship and another fast craft. For this mission, ARCA constructed the largest stratospheric helium balloon to date. An error in construction caused the balloon's inflation arms to wrap around the base of the balloon when it was inflated. The team managed to unwrap the arms and resume inflation but sunset was approaching and the solar balloon could no longer be used. The mission was cancelled.

For Mission 4 ARCAspace decided to use a helium balloon instead and to redesign the Helen rocket. The new version, named Helen 2, was prepared for flight on August 4, 2010. When balloon inflation was initiated, the balloon ruptured because of a construction error and the mission was cancelled.

A new attempt was made on October 1, 2010, by using only the final stage of the Helen 2 rocket and a smaller helium balloon. The flight, named Mission 4B, was successful, Helen 2 launching at an altitude of 14,000 m (46,000 ft) and the rocket reaching an altitude of 38.7 km (24.0 mi). After the difficulties encountered with stratospheric balloons, ARCA decided to stop work on the Haas rocket and design a new family of ground-launched orbital and suborbital rockets.

=== Mission 5 ===
Mission 5 was carried out in partnership with the Romanian Air Club and the Romanian Aeronautic Federation. It took place before the Helen 2 rocket launch. The flight took place on April 27, 2010, between 07:45 and 08:45 AM, taking off from Hogiz, Brasov. A manned hot air balloon lifted the Helen 2 rocket pressurised capsule to an altitude of 5,200 m (17,100 ft). The maximum distance between the carrier balloon and the command center at Sanpetru airfield was 42 km (26 mi), which corresponded with the Helen 2 rocket simulated safety zone. The balloon crew was composed of Mihai Ilie – pilot, Mugurel Ionescu – copilot, and Dumitru Popescu – ELL equipment operator. The objective of the flight was to test telemetry, command and live TV transmission for the Helen 2 rocket.

=== Mission 6 ===
Mission 6 tested the recovery system for the IAR-111 supersonic plane crew capsule. On September 26, 2011, a Mi-17 helicopter from Special Aviation Unit lifted the capsule to 700 m (2,300 ft) above mean sea level. At that altitude, the helicopter released the capsule. The parachute deployed, and the capsule landed on the sea surface. It was recovered by the same helicopter with the help of the Romanian Coast Guard.

=== WP3 ===
WP3 was a validation test flight for the ExoMars Program High Altitude Drop Test (HADT), carried out in cooperation with the European Space Agency. The launch took place from the Black Sea coast on September 16, 2013, and the hardware comprised three pressurized containers containing the avionics equipment that will be necessary to test the ExoMars spacecraft parachute during future incoming flights. The pressurized containers, carried by a cluster balloon, were launched at 7:15 AM and the ascension took 90 minutes. When the containers reached an altitude of 24.4 km (15.2 mi), they were released under a dedicated recovery parachute and landed on the sea twenty minutes later. The containers and the recovery parachute were recovered by the Navy 92 km (57 mi) from the launch point.

The objectives were flight testing the avionics and communication systems, demonstrating the container sealing after sea landing and the capability to identify and recover the equipment from the sea surface.

=== Mission 9 ===
Mission 9 was to be a short vertical hop of the EcoRocket's first stage, testing the booster landing system in much the same manner as SpaceX's Starhopper. This mission has apparently been scrapped, however, ARCA completed a short, low-altitude flight of the EcoRocket Demonstrator's second stage in the fall of 2021 with no landing attempt to test the RCS systems aboard the rocket. The stage was attached to an umbilical during the flight.

=== Mission 10 ===
Mission 10 was supposed to be the first suborbital space flight of the EcoRocket Demonstrator in 2021 and then the first orbital space flight in 2022, however, it did not happen.

=== Mission 11 ===
Mission 11 was the first mission under the new Commercial EcoRocket (CER) program. The test validated the canister exist sequence of the CER-160TR artillery target rocket, in a similar manner to the silo exit of a missile or interceptor. The test took place in November 2023.

=== Mission 12 ===
Mission 12 tested the new design and landing technique for the AMi capsule in October 2023. Since the capsule’s full scale diameter is ~7 meters, ARCA constructed a subscale vehicle for the test. The demonstrator was carried to an altitude of ~600m by a manned hot air balloon and was released. The vehicle took roughly 15 seconds to impact the ground, where the parachute-less, high-velocity landing method was validated by the acceptable damage the vehicle sustained.

=== Mission 13 ===
Mission 13 was a launch of the LAS-1 rocket from an ARCA-built water tower, to validate and assess the performance of the engine’s start and thrust while submerged. This will be the case for the EcoRocket Demonstrator, 5, and Heavy’s sea launch procedure. In March 2023, following some delays, the LAS-1 was launched and the test was successful.

=== Mission 15 ===
The Mission 15 series of EcoRocket flights will eventually lead to ARCA’s first orbital spaceflight. Mission 15 has been described as using the EcoRocket 5 vehicle, with an unknown ecological third stage. Mission 15A aims to reach the orbital altitude of 180 km during a suborbital/vertical flight. 15B intends to place the company’s first satellite into orbit. Timeline is unknown.

=== Mission 16 ===
Mission 16 was performed with the CER program’s RTV vehicle, a payload launched by a CER rocket in order to simulate an enemy attack and to train anti-ballistic forces. It was performed minutes before Mission 12, as both vehicles were carried by the same manned hot air balloon. The drop test collected data on the vehicle’s stability and flight parameters at low speeds and altitudes, without using the spin stabilization system.

=== Mission 17 ===
Mission 17 was a launch of the CER-160TR rocket from Cape Midia AFB, Romania, for the purpose of military certification. It was one of at least three flights planned for the homologation process, which will allow the Romanian military forces to use the launch system to train the anti-ballistic forces against enemy missile attacks. It was the first launch of a CER-160TR configuration, the first commercially used vehicle, and the first from the canister featuring “angled support” (the ability to change the firing angle of the system to achieve various flight trajectories). Mission 17 was successful, followed just 2 hours later by the next sequential flight, Mission 18.

== See also ==
- ArcaBoard
- Romanian Space Agency
- Rockoon
