= High-altitude platform station =

Aircraft that provides common satellite services

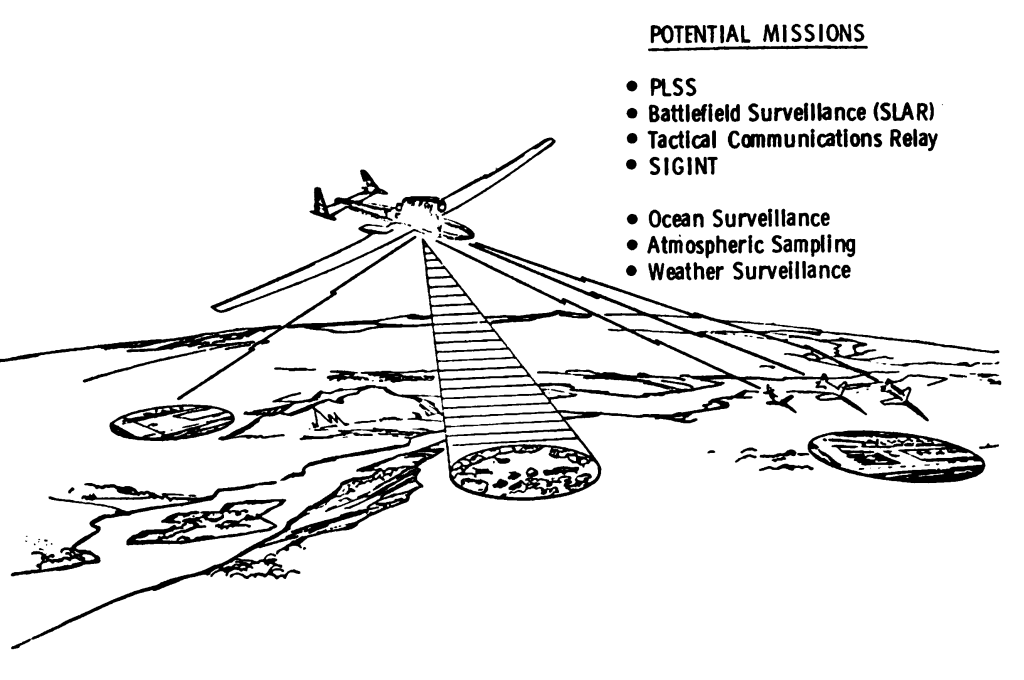
A high altitude platform can provide observation or communication services.

A high-altitude platform station (HAPS, which can also mean high-altitude pseudo-satellite or high-altitude platform systems), also known as atmospheric satellite, is a long endurance, high altitude aircraft able to offer observation or communication services similarly to artificial satellites. Mostly unmanned aerial vehicles (UAVs), they remain aloft through atmospheric lift, either aerodynamic like airplanes, or aerostatic like airships or balloons. High-altitude long endurance (HALE) military drones can fly above 60,000 ft (18,000 m) over 32 hours, while civil HAPS are radio stations at an altitude of 20 to 50 km above waypoints, for weeks.

High-altitude, long endurance flight has been studied since at least 1983, and demonstrator programs since 1994. Hydrogen and solar power have been proposed as alternatives to conventional engines. Above commercial air transport and wind turbulence, at high altitudes, drag as well as lift are reduced. HAPS could be used for weather monitoring, as a radio relay, for oceanography or earth imaging, for border security, maritime patrol and anti-piracy operations, disaster response, or agricultural observation.

While reconnaissance aircraft have been capable of reaching high altitudes since the 1950s, their endurance is limited. One of the few operational HALE aircraft is the Northrop Grumman RQ-4 Global Hawk. There are many solar powered, lightweight prototypes like the NASA Pathfinder/Helios, or the Airbus Zephyr that can fly for 64 days; few are as advanced as these. Conventional aviation fuels have been used in prototypes since 1970 and can fly for 60 hours like the Boeing Condor. Hydrogen aircraft can fly even longer, a week or longer, like the AeroVironment Global Observer.

Stratospheric airships are often presented as a competing technology. However few prototypes have been built and none are operational. Among balloons specifically, the most well known high-endurance project was Google Loon, using helium-filled high-altitude balloons to reach the stratosphere. Loon was ended in 2021 after nine years of development.

== Definitions ==
High-altitude long endurance (HALE)
High-altitude, long-endurance (HALE) aircraft are non-weaponized military drones capable of flying at 60,000 ft (18,000 m) over 32 hours, like the USAF RQ-4 Global Hawk or its variants used for ISR. This is above and longer than Medium-Altitude, Long-Endurance (MALE) aircraft flying between 25,000 and 50,000 ft (7,600 and 15,200 m) during 24 hours, more vulnerable to anti-aircraft defense, like the USAF ISR/strike MQ-9 Reaper or its variants.

High-altitude platform station (HAPS)
defined by the International Telecommunication Union (ITU) as "a station on an object at an altitude of 20 to 50 km and at a specified, nominal, fixed point relative to the Earth" in its ITU Radio Regulations (RR). HAPS can also be the abbreviation for high-altitude pseudo-satellite.

== Studies ==
Video of NASA Helios in flight

In 1983, Lockheed produced A Preliminary Study of solar powered aircraft and Associated Power Trains for the NASA, as long endurance flight could be compared to suborbital spacecraft. In 1984 was published the Design of Long Endurance Unmanned Airplanes Incorporating Solar and fuel cell propulsion report. In 1989, the Design and experimental results for a high-altitude, long-endurance airfoil report proposed applications as a radio relay, for weather monitoring or cruise missile targeting.

The NASA ERAST Program (Environmental Research Aircraft and Sensor Technology) was started in September 1994 to study high-altitude UAVs, and was terminated in 2003. In July 1996, the USAF Strikestar 2025 report forecast HALE UAVs maintaining air occupation with 24 hours flights. The Defense Airborne Reconnaissance Office made demonstrations of long-endurance UAV craft. In September 1996, Israel Aircraft Industries detailed the design of a HALE UAV.

In 2002, Preliminary reliability design of a solar-powered high-altitude very long endurance unmanned air vehicle was published. The European Union CAPECON project aimed to develop HALE vehicles, while the Polish Academy of Sciences proposed its PW-114 concept that would fly at 20 km (66,000 ft) for 40 hours. Luminati Aerospace proposed its Substrata solar-powered aircraft that would fly in formation like migratory geese to reduce the power required for the trailing aircraft by 79%, allowing smaller airframes to remain aloft indefinitely up to a latitude of 50°.

== Design ==
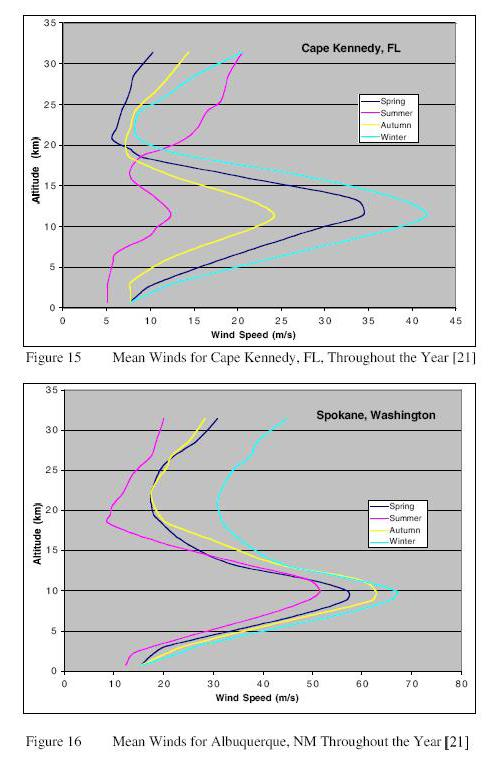
Wind profile variation with altitude from NASA, showing minimum wind speeds between 17 and 22 km (56,000 and 72,000 ft). Although absolute values will vary, the trends shown are similar for most locations.

Power
Power is required for continuous operation, limiting endurance by the need for refueling. Persistent solar-powered aircraft need to store daylight energy for the night, in electric batteries, or in fuel cells.

Altitude selection
Drag is reduced in the tropopause thin air, well above the 40–160 kn (74–296 km/h) high winds and air traffic of the high troposphere between 20,000 to 35,000 ft (6,100 to 10,700 m). Maintaining a position facing variable winds is a challenge. Relatively mild wind and turbulence above the jet stream is found in most locations in the stratosphere between 17 and 22 km (56,000 and 72,000 ft), although this is variable with the latitude and season. Altitudes above 55,000 ft (17,000 m) are also above commercial air transport. Flying in the tropopause at 65,000 ft (20,000 m) is above clouds and turbulence with winds below 5 kn (9 km/h), and above FAA-regulated Class A airspace ending at 60,000 ft (18,000 m).

Comparison to satellites
A lower altitude covers more effectively a small region, implies a lower telecommunications link budget (a 34 dB advantage over a LEO, 66 dB over GEO), a lower power consumption, and a smaller round-trip delay. Satellites are more expensive, take longer to deploy, and cannot be reasonably accessed for maintenance. A satellite in the vacuum of space orbits due to its high speed generating a centrifugal force matching the gravity. Changing a satellite orbit requires expending its extremely limited fuel supply.

== Applications ==
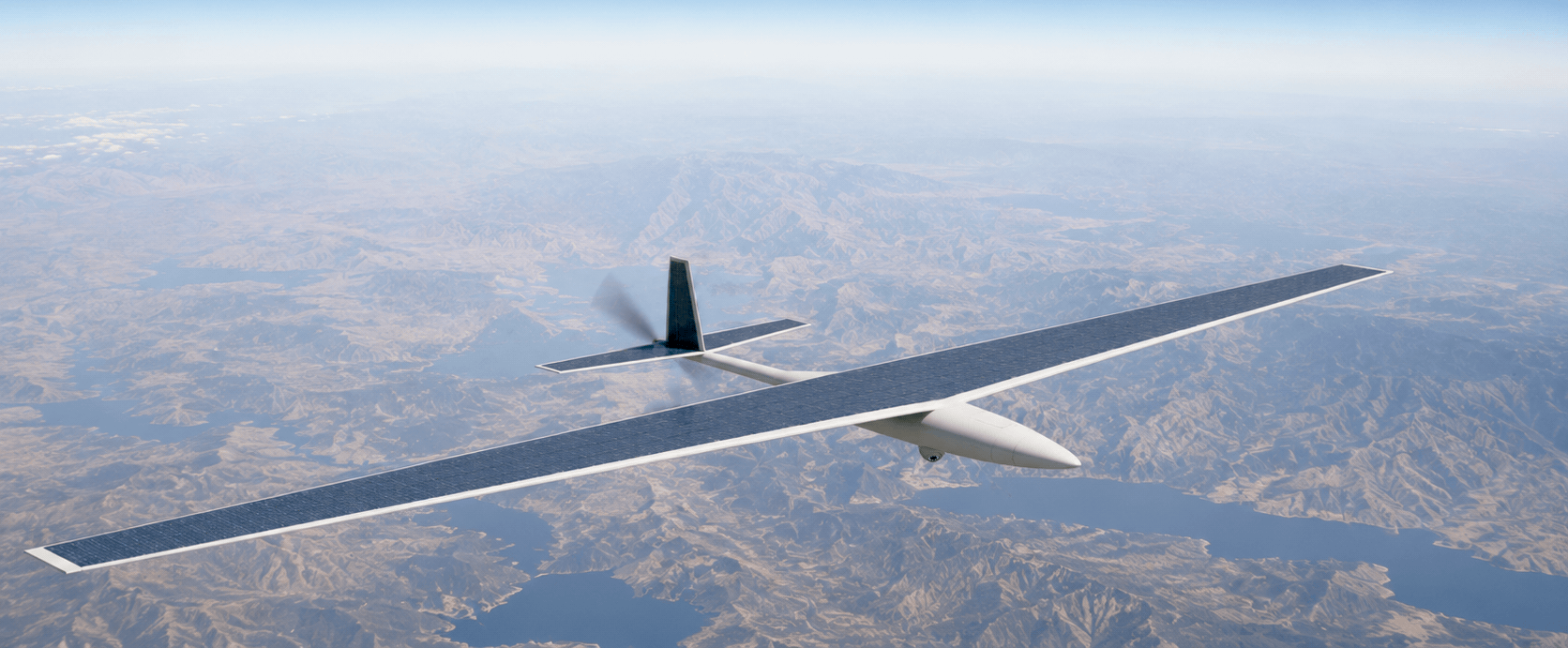
Solar drone conceptual rendering

Atmospheric satellites could be used for weather monitoring, as a radio relay, for oceanography or earth imaging like an orbital satellite for a fraction of the cost. Other uses include border security, maritime patrol and anti-piracy operations, disaster response, or agricultural observation. They could bring internet connectivity to the 5 billion people lacking it, either with 11,000 airplane UAVs or with balloons like Google's Project Loon.

Radiocommunication services
Commercial air transport cruises at approximately 10,000 m (33,000 ft)–12,000 m (39,000 ft). HAPS can deliver radio connectivity to users, as an altitude above 12,500 m (41,000 ft) enable line-of-sight propagation of at least 400 km (220 nmi). HAPS could deliver bandwidth and capacity similar to a broadband wireless access network, like WiMAX, over a coverage area similar to that of a satellite. This can provide a contingency civil communication system during power failures, and be used for military communications in areas such as Afghanistan, where mountainous terrain interferes with communications signals. World Mobile is testing a platform flying for 6 days at around 20,000 m (66,000 ft), which can serve up to 500,000 users in an area of 15,000 km² (161,458,656,000 ft²). Within that area, connectivity can be delivered directly to devices across 3G, 4G, 5G, and future 6G standards.

Surveillance and intelligence
The Northrop Grumman RQ-4 Global Hawk UAV is used by the US Air Force for surveillance and security. It carries a radar, optical, and infrared imagers; and is able to transmit its data in realtime.

Real-time monitoring
An area could be monitored for flood detection, seismic monitoring, remote sensing and disaster management.

Weather and environmental monitoring
For environment and weather monitoring, high-altitude balloons can deploy scientific equipment to measure environmental changes or to keep track of weather. In partnership with The National Oceanic and Atmospheric Administration (NOAA), NASA has started using Global Hawk UAVs to study Earth's atmosphere.

Rocket launch
More than 90% of atmospheric matter is below the high-altitude platform, reducing atmospheric drag for starting rockets: "As a rough estimate, a rocket that reaches an altitude of 20 km (66,000 ft) when launched from the ground will reach 100 km (54 nmi) if launched at an altitude of 20 km (66,000 ft) from a balloon." Mass drivers have been proposed for launching to orbit.

== Airplanes ==
Reconnaissance aircraft like the late 1950s Lockheed U-2 could fly above 70,000 ft (21,000 m) and the 1964 SR-71 above 80,000 ft (24,000 m). The twin-turbofan powered Myasishchev M-55 reached an altitude of 21,360 m (70,080 ft) in 1993, a variant of the M-17 first flown in 1982, which reached 21,830 m (71,620 ft) in 1990.

=== Operational ===
Grob G 520 Egrett
The manned Grob G 520 first flew on 24 June 1987 and was certified in 1991. Powered by a Honeywell TPE331 turboprop, it is 33 m (108 ft) wide, reached 16,329 m (53,574 ft), and can stay airborne for 13 hours.

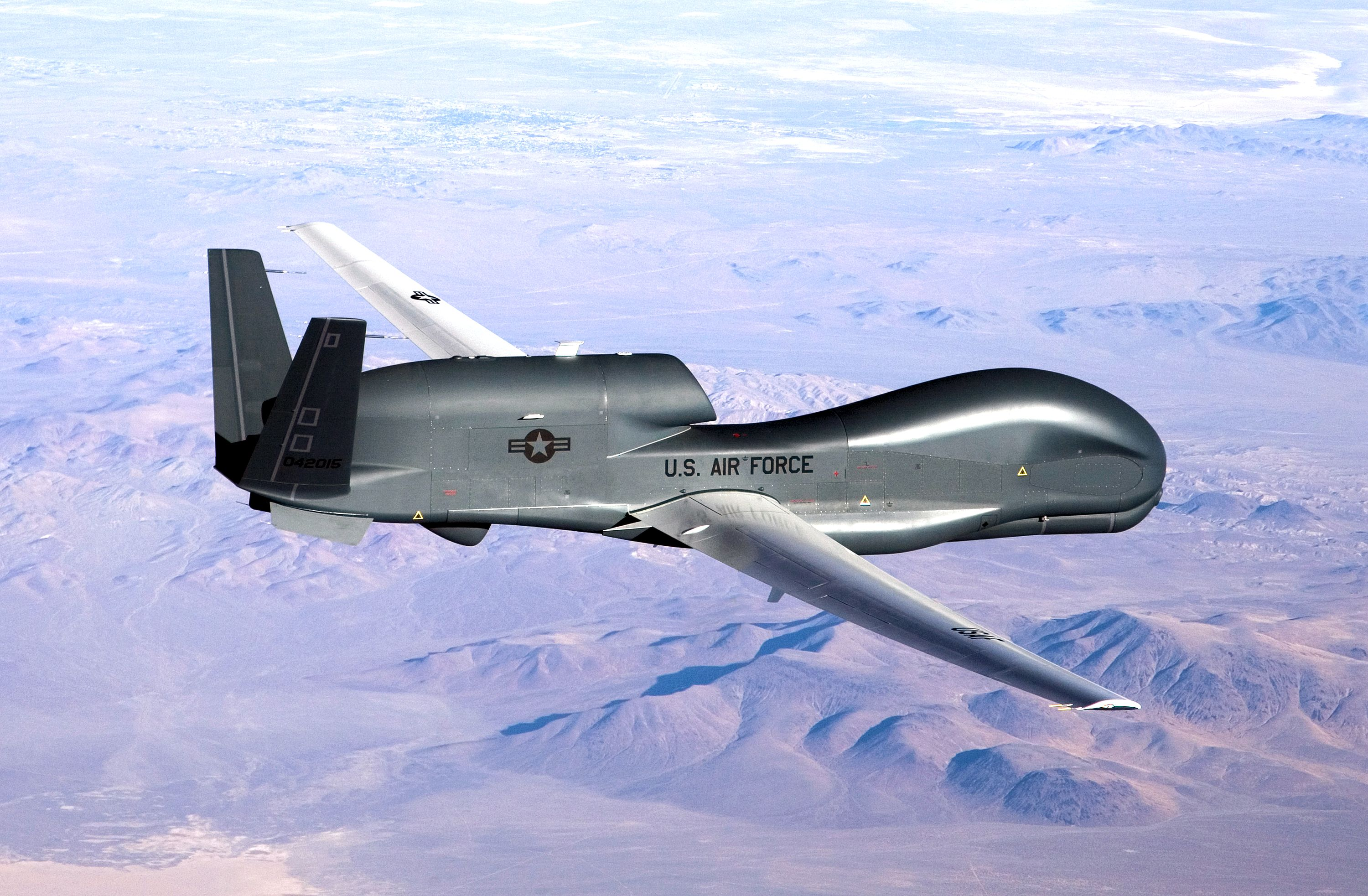
Capable of flying up to 60,000 ft (18,300 m) more than 34 hours, the RQ-4 Global Hawk was put into USAF service in 2001.

Northrop Grumman RQ-4 Global Hawk
The Northrop Grumman RQ-4 Global Hawk first flew on 28 February 1998 and was put into USAF service in 2001. The 131 ft (40 m) wide, 48 ft (14.5 m) long RQ-4 is powered by a single Rolls-Royce F137 turbofan, weighs up to 32,250 lb (14.6 t) at takeoff, and carries a 3,000 lb (1,360 kg) payload up to 60,000 ft (18,300 m) over more than 34 hours. It can be used as a radio relay and can carry electro-optical, infrared, synthetic aperture radar (SAR), and high and low band SIGINT sensors. A total 42 of them have been in service with the United States Air Force. It is the basis for the US Navy's MQ-4C Triton.

=== Prototypes ===
==== Solar powered ====
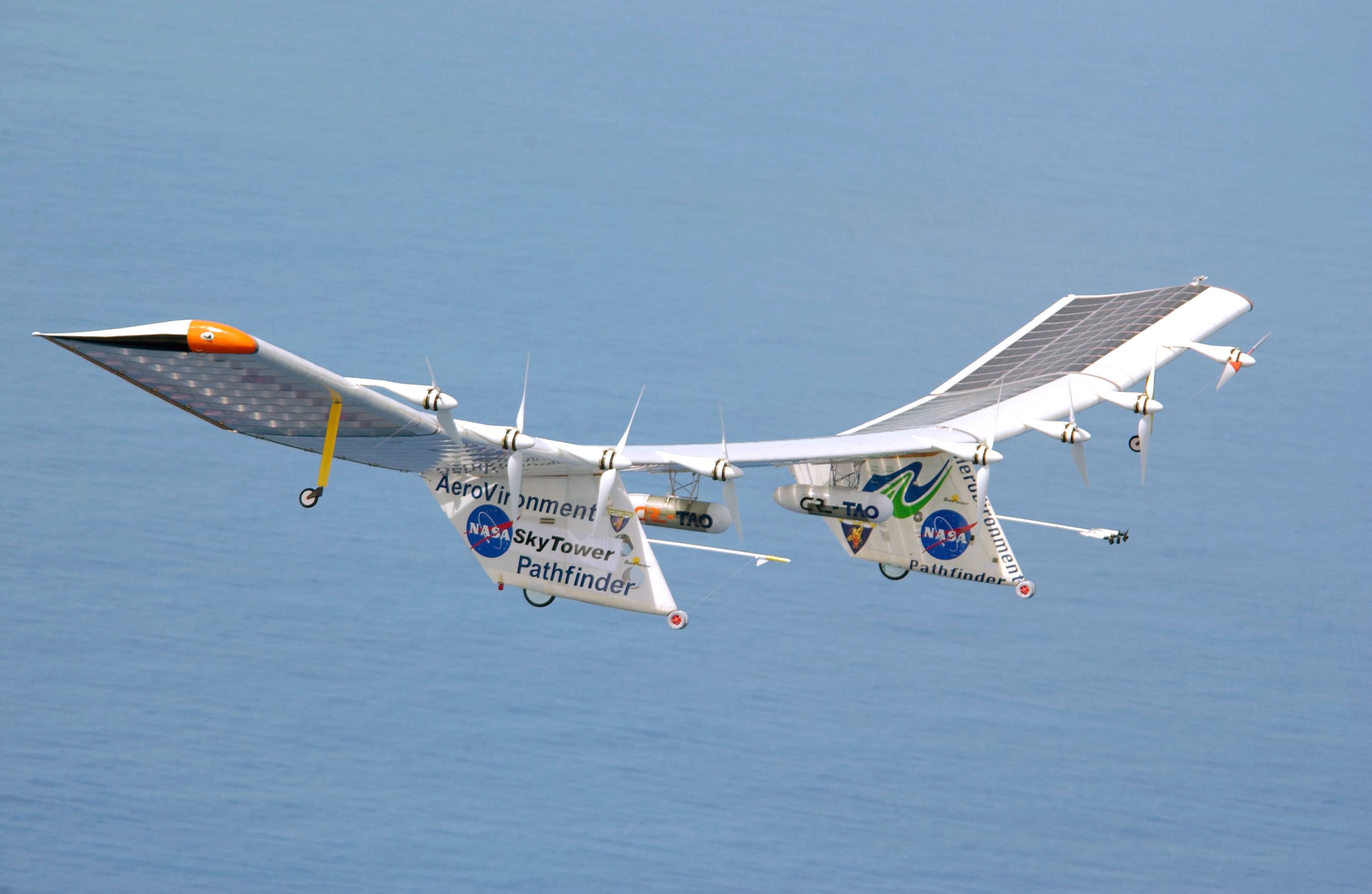
NASA Pathfinder Plus

AeroVironment/NASA Pathfinder
The HALSOL prototype, a 185 kg (410 lb), 30 m (98.4 ft) wide flying wing propelled by eight electric motors, first flew in June 1983. It joined the NASA ERAST Program in late 1993 as the Pathfinder, and with solar cells covering the entire wing added later, it reached 50,500 ft (15,400 m) on September 11, 1995 and then 71,530 ft (21,800 m) in 1997. The Pathfinder Plus had four sections of the Pathfinder wing out of five attached to a longer center section, increasing span to 121 ft (37 m), it flew in 1998 and reached 80,201 ft (24,445 m) on August 6 of that year.

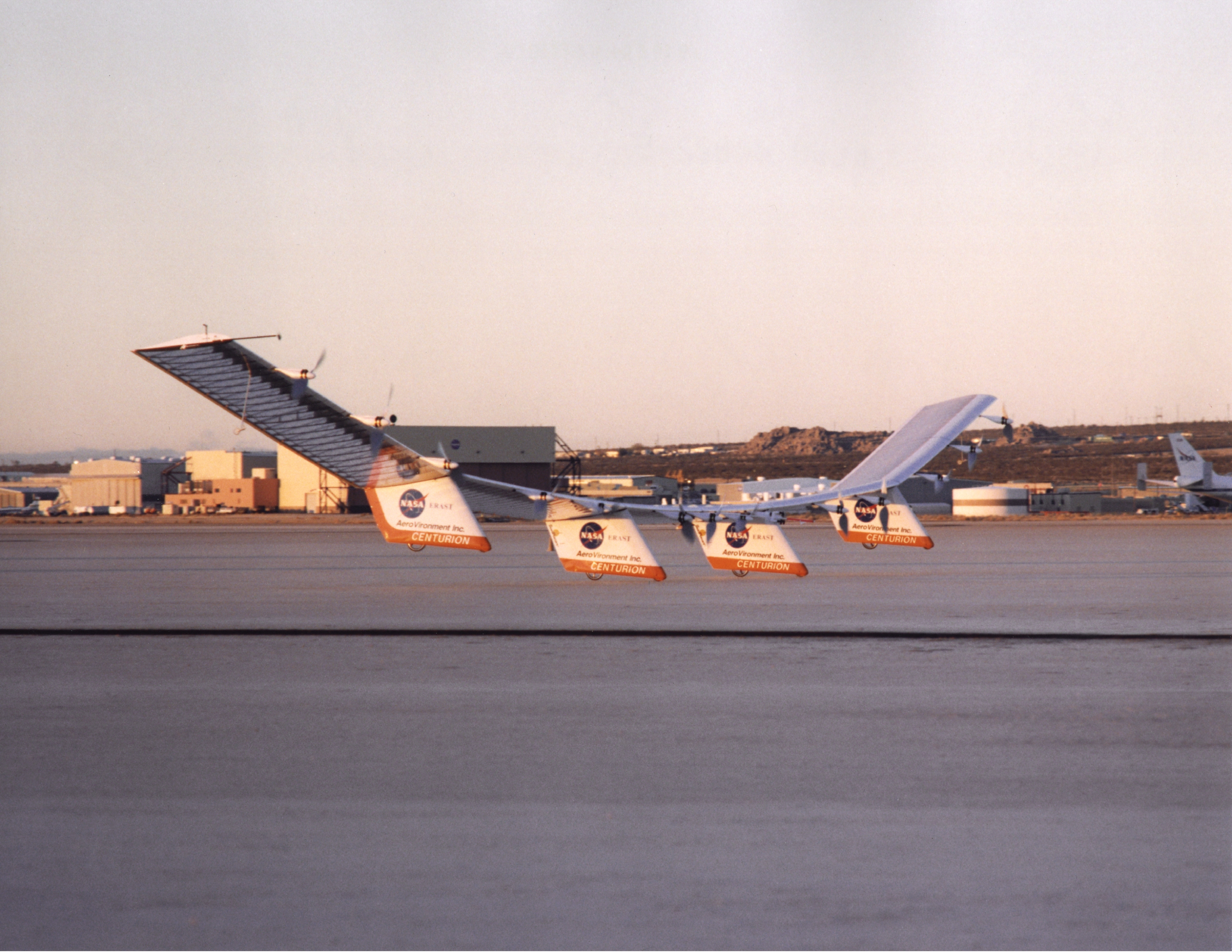
NASA Centurion

AeroVironment/NASA Centurion/Helios Prototype
Flying in late 1998, the Centurion had a redesigned high-altitude airfoil and span increased to 206 ft (63 m), 14 motors, four underwing pods to carry batteries, systems and landing gear. It was modified into the Helios Prototype, with a sixth 41 ft (12 m) wing section for a 247 ft (75 m) span, and a fifth landing gear and systems pod. It first flew in late 1999, solar panels were added in 2000 and it reached 96,863 ft (29,524 m) on August 13, 2001. A production aircraft would fly for up to six months. It broke up in flight in 2003.

Airbus Zephyr
The Zephyr were originally designed by QinetiQ, a commercial offshoot of the UK Ministry of Defence. The UAVs are powered by solar cells, recharging batteries in daylight to stay aloft at night. The earliest model flew in December 2005. In March 2013, the project was sold to Airbus Defence and Space. The latest Zephyr 8/S model weighs 75 kg (165 lb), has a wingspan of 25 m (82 ft), and reached 23,200 m (76,100 ft).

Solar Impulse
The first Solar Impulse manned demonstrator made its first flight on 3 December 2009, and flew an entire diurnal solar cycle in a July 2010 26-hour flight. The 71.9 m (236 ft) wide, 2.3 tonnes (5,100 lb) Solar Impulse 2 first flew on 2 June 2014, it could reach 12,000 m (39,000 ft) and its longest flight was from Nagoya, Japan to Kalaeloa, Hawaii over 117 h 52 min on 28 June 2015.

Titan Aerospace Solara
Founded in 2012 in New Mexico, Titan Aerospace was developing large solar-powered, high-altitude atmospheric satellites similar to the AeroVironment Global Observer or QinetiQ Zephyr. Their wing, over 160 ft (50 m) wide, would be covered with solar cells to provide energy for day flight, stored in electric batteries for use at night. Costing less than $2 million, they could carry a 70 lb (30 kg) payload for up to five years, limited by battery deterioration. In 2013, Titan was flying two fifth-scale test models and aimed to flight test a full-sized prototype by 2014. In March 2014, Facebook was interested in the company, led at the time by Eclipse Aviation founder Vern Raburn, for $60 million. Google bought Titan Aerospace in April 2014, managed to fly a prototype in May 2015 but it crashed within minutes and Titan Aerospace was shut down by early 2017.

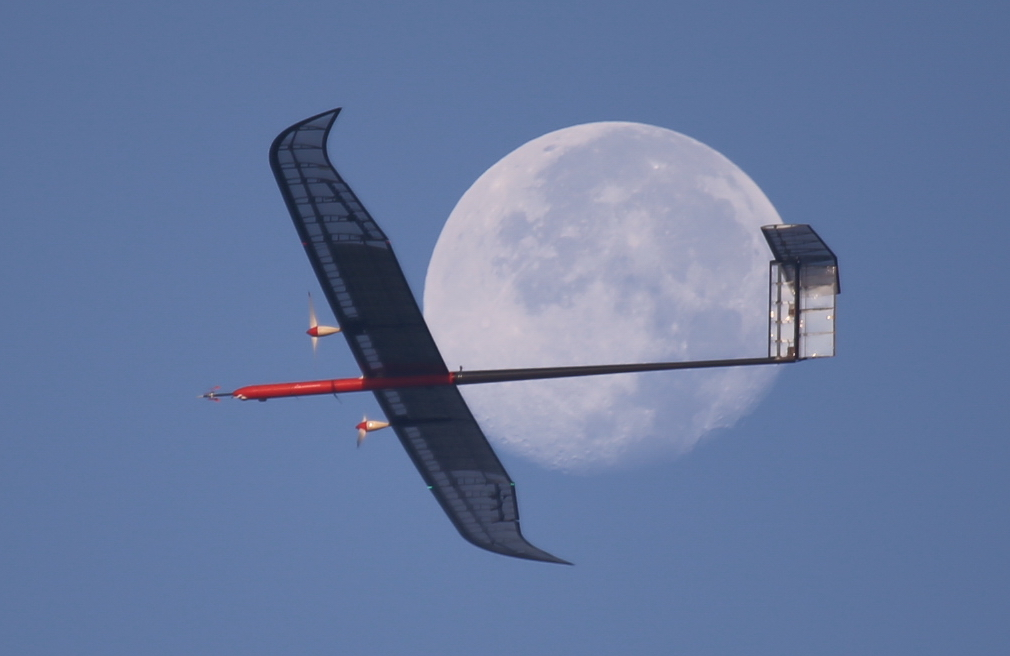
The KARI EAV-3 flew during 53 hours and up to 22 km (72,000 ft).

KARI EAV
The Korea Aerospace Research Institute (KARI) began developing its Electrical Aerial Vehicle (EAV) in 2010, after subscale demonstrators, its latest 20 m (66 ft) wide EAV-3 weighs 66 kg (146 lb) and is designed to fly for months; it flew up to 14.2 km (47,000 ft) in August 2015, during 53 hours and up to 22 km (72,000 ft) in August 2020.

Astigan A3
UK mapping agency Ordnance Survey (OS), a subsidiary of the Department for Business, Energy & Industrial Strategy, is developing the A3, a 38 m (125 ft) wingspan, 149 kg (330 lb) twin-boom solar-powered HAPS designed to stay aloft at 67,000 ft (20,000 m) for 90 days carrying a 25 kg (55 lb) payload. OS owns 51% of UK company Astigan, led by Brian Jones, developing the A3 since 2014 with scale model test flights in 2015 and full-scale low-altitude flights in 2016. High-altitude flights should begin in 2019, to complete tests in 2020 with a commercial introduction as for environmental monitoring, mapping, communications and security. In March 2021, the project was ended as no strategic partner was found.

Facebook Aquila
The Facebook Aquila UAV was a carbon fiber, solar-powered flying wing UAV spanning 132 ft (40 m) and weighing 935 lb (424 kg), designed to stay aloft at FL650 for 90 days. It was designed and manufactured by UK company Ascenta for Facebook, to provide internet connectivity. UAVs would use Laser communication between them and to ground stations. On June 28, 2016, it took its first flight, during ninety minutes and reaching 2,150 ft (660 m), but a twenty-foot section of the righthand wing broke off during final approach. It made another low-altitude test flights in 2017. On June 27, 2018, Facebook announced it will halt the project and plan to have other companies build the drones.

China Aerospace Science and Technology Corporation
CASTC flew a 147 ft (45 m)-span solar-powered UAV to FL650 in a 15 hours test flight in July 2017.

Lavochkin LA-252
Russia's Lavochkin design bureau is flight-testing the LA-252, an 82 ft (25 m)-span, 255 lb (116 kg) solar-powered UAV designed to stay aloft 100 days in the stratosphere.

Mira Aerospace ApusDuo
A joint venture between Abu Dhabi-based Bayanat AI and American UAV manufacturer UAVOS, Mira Aerospace's ApusDuo HAPS has completed over 100 test flights across 3 continents, building off technologies first developed in 2014. With a wingspan of 14 m (46 ft), the unmanned ApusDuo 14 aircraft utilizes a flexible tandem wing design with high-efficiency solar cells to fly continuously for months at altitudes up to 19,000 m (62,000 ft), carrying payloads up to 6 kg (13 lb). During a test flight in Rwanda in October 2023, Mira Aerospace became the first company to successfully deliver 5G connectivity from a fixed-wing HAPS autonomous aircraft in the stratosphere.

Aurora Odysseus
Aurora Flight Sciences announced its Odysseus in November 2018. The 74.1m (243ft) wide carbon fibre aircraft weigh less than 880 kg (1,940 lb) and can carry a 25kg (55lb) payload. It was designed to stay above 65,000 ft (20,000 m) up to three months at latitudes up to 20°. Its first flight was indefinitely delayed by July 2019.

AeroVironment HAPSMobile
AeroVironment will design and development solar-powered UAV prototypes for $65 million for HAPSMobile, a joint venture 95% funded and owned by Japanese telco SoftBank. Resembling the 1999 Helios, the 256 ft (78 m) span flying wing with 10 electric-driven propellers would provide 4G LTE and 5G direct to devices over a 200 km (125 mi) diameter area On 21–22 September 2020, the HAPSMobile Hawk30 (rebranded as Sunglider) flew 20 hours and reached an altitude of 62,500 ft (19,000 m), testing the long-distance LTE communications developed with Loon for standard LTE smartphones and wireless broadband communications.

BAE Systems PHASA-35
Designed by Prismatic Ltd., now BAE Systems, the 35 m (115 ft)-wingspan BAE Systems PHASA-35 made its maiden flight in February 2020 from the Woomera Test Range in South Australia; it should fly its 15 kg (33 lb) payload at around 70,000 ft for days or weeks. By December 2024, it had flown for 24h and reached more than 66,000 ft (20,000 m) from Spaceport America in New Mexico, targeting operational activity by 2026.

Swift Engineering SULE
The Swift Engineering's Swift Ultra Long Endurance SULE completed its maiden flight partnership with NASA's Ames Research Center in July 2020. Designed to operate at 70,000 ft (21,000 m), the persistent 72 ft (22 m) UAV weighs less than 180 lb (82 kg) and can carry up to 15 lb (6.8 kg) payloads. On Sep. 29-30, 2024, it reached 55,904 ft (17,040 m) in a 24-hour flight. It took off from and landed at Spaceport America in New Mexico.

HAL CATS Infinity
CATS Infinity is being developed by HAL, NAL and NewSpace Research. Its scaled down model first flew in 2022. In February 2024, the 23 kg (51 lb) scaled down prototype with a 12 m (39 ft) wingspan reached 3,000 m (9,800 ft) from Chitradurga Aeronautical Test Range during eight and a half hours, development completion was then expected for 2027. In May 2024, the scaled down prototype flight tests reached 26,000 ft (7,900 m) during 27 hours from Chitradurga. The subscale prototype has a goal of a 7-day flight at an altitude of 20 km (66,000 ft) cruising at 100 km/h (54 kn). The full-scale, 450 kg (990 lb) CATS Infinity target is a ninety-day endurance at high altitudes, with a 35 kg (77 lb) payload. The Indian Navy is also interested in this project.

Kea Atmos Mk1
The Kea Atmos Mk1 solar-powered stratospheric HAPS was designed and manufactured by Kea Aerospace in New Zealand. The maiden test flight was in February 2023 and the first stratospheric flight was on February 8, 2025. It has a wingspan of 12.5 meters and weighs less than 40 kg. The Kea Atmos Mk1 is designed to take 2 kg payloads to the stratosphere on dawn to dusk single day missions and is working with a range of international payload customers. Kea Aerospace is currently designing the Kea Atmos Mk2 to take 6 kg of payload to the stratosphere on multi-month length missions.

HAPSEYE

The SAR (Synthetic Aperture Radar) satellite provider ICEYE started developing a complementary SAR monitoring capability under the ESA InCubed program in 2025.

Solar-powered HAPS
Model	First flight	Span	Weight	Payload	Altitude	Endurance (dd-hh:mm)	Status
AeroVironment Pathfinder	1993-T4	98.4 ft (29.5 m)	560 lb (252 kg)	100 lb (45 kg)	71,530 ft (21,800 m)	00-12:00	
AeroVironment Pathfinder plus	1998	121 ft (36.3 m)	700 lb (315 kg)	150 lb (67,5 kg)	80,201 ft (24,445 m)		
AeroVironment Helios	1999-09-08	247 ft (75 m)	2,048 lb (929 kg)	726 lb (329 kg)	96,863 ft (29,524 m)	goal: > 1-00:00	2003 crash
Airbus Zephyr	2005-12	82 ft (25 m)	165 lb (75 kg)	11 lb (5 kg)	76,100 ft (23,200 m)	64-00:00	2026 planned intro.
Titan Aerospace Solara	2015-05-01	160 ft (50 m)		70 lb (30 kg)	520 ft (160 m)	00-00:04	2017 shut down
KARI EAV-3	2015-08	66 ft (20 m)	146 lb (66 kg)		72,000 ft (22,000 m)	02-05:00	
UK OS Astigan A3	2016	125 ft (38 m)	330 lb (149 kg)	55 lb (25 kg)	goal: 67,000 ft (20,000 m)	goal: 90-00:00	2021 project end
Facebook Aquila	2016-06-28	132 ft (40 m)	935 lb (424 kg)		2,150 ft (660 m)	00-01:30	2018 project halt
CASTC	2017-07	147 ft (45 m)			65,000 ft (20,000 m)	00-15:00	
Lavochkin LA-252	2017-T4	82 ft (25 m)	255 lb (116 kg)		goal: stratosphere	goal: 100-00:00	
Mira Aerospace's ApusDuo	2018-10	46 ft (14 m)	95 lb (43 kg)	7.9 lb (3.6 kg)	54,744 ft (16,686 m)	00-10:30	
AeroVironment HAPSMobile	2019-09-11	256 ft (78 m)			62,500 ft (19,000 m)	00-20:00	
BAE Systems PHASA-35	2020-02	115 ft (35 m)	330 lb (150 kg)	33 lb (15 kg)	66,000 ft (20,000 m)+	03-00:00	2026 operations target
Swift Engineering SULE	2020-07	72 ft (22 m)	180 lb (82 kg)	15 lb (6.8 kg)	55,904 ft (17,040 m)	01-00:00	
HAL CATS Infinity	2022-10-19	39 ft (12 m)	51 lb (23 kg)		26,000 ft (7,900 m)	01-03:00	subscale testing

==== Hydrocarbon fueled ====
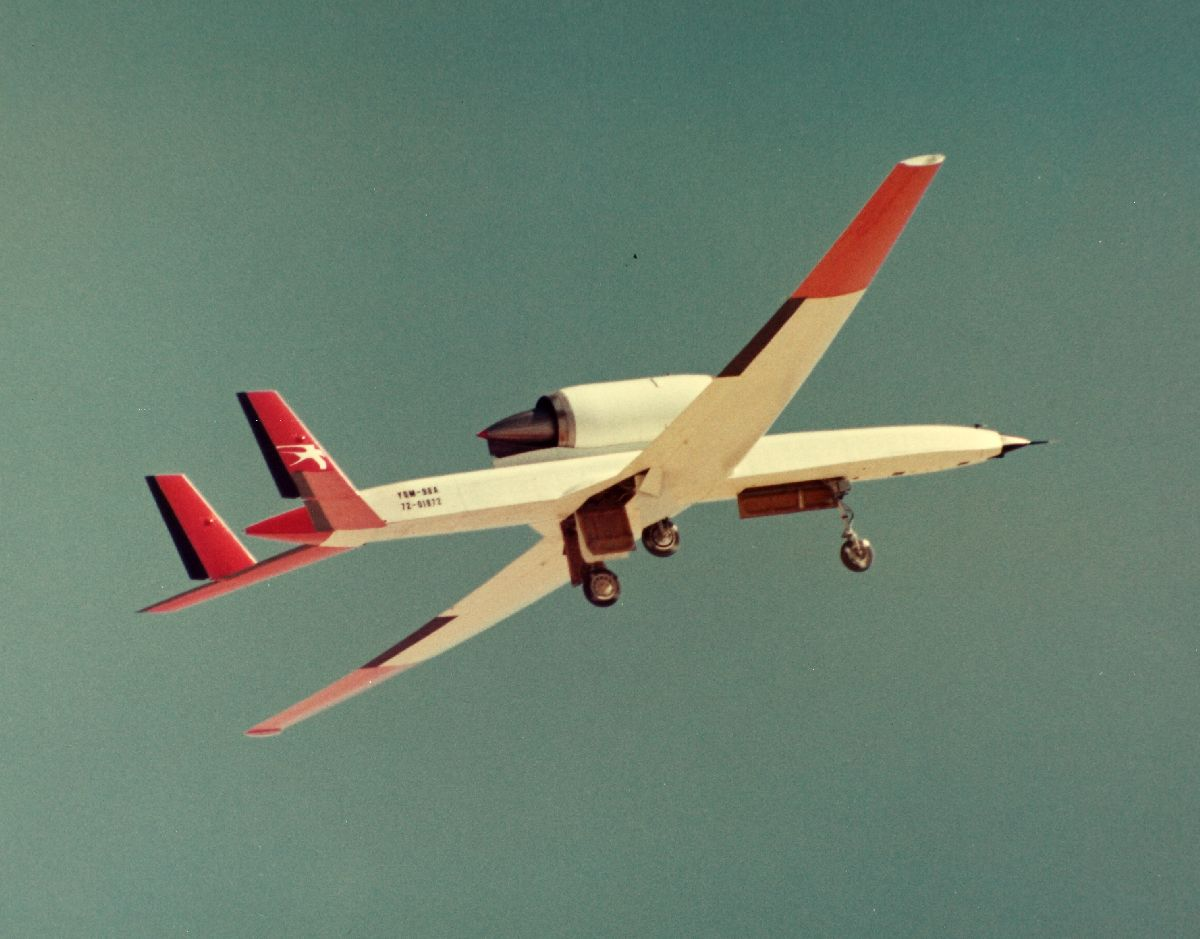
The Ryan YQM-98 R-Tern of the Compass Cope program first flew on 17 August 1974 and was designed to fly up to 70,000 ft (21,340 m) and during 30 hours

USAF Compass Dwell and Compass Cope
The USAF Compass Dwell UAV program saw the flight of the LTV XQM-93 in February 1970, based on a turboprop-powered Schweizer SGS 2-32 sailplane and designed to fly 24 hours and to reach 50,000 ft (15,240 m); and the Martin Marietta Model 845 in April 1972, based on a piston engine-powered Schweizer SGS 1-34 sailplane, designed to reach 40,000 feet (12,000 m) and capable to fly 28 hours. The following Compass Cope program saw the Boeing YQM-94 B-Gull first flight on 28 July 1973: powered by a General Electric J97 turbojet, it was designed to fly 30 hours up to 70,000 ft (21,340 m), and managed to fly during 17.4 hours and up to 55,000 feet (16,800 m); the competing Ryan YQM-98 R-Tern was powered by a Garrett ATF3 turbofan, first flew on 17 August 1974 and was designed to fly during 30 hours.

Boeing Condor
The Boeing Condor first flew on October 9, 1988, it reached 67,028 ft (20,430 m) and stayed aloft for nearly 60 hours; powered by two 175 hp (130 kW) piston engines, the 200 ft (61 m) wide UAV had a 20,300 lb (9,200 kg) gross weight and was designed to reach 73,000 ft (22,250 m) and to fly for more than a week.

Aurora Perseus and Theseus
Built by Aurora Flight Sciences for what would become the NASA ERAST Program, the Perseus Proof-Of-Concept UAV first flew in November 1991 followed by Perseus A on 21 December 1993, which reached over 50,000 ft (15,000 m). Designed to fly at 62,000 ft (18.9 km) and up to 24 hours, Perseus B first flew on 7 October 1994 and reached 60,280 ft (18,370 m) on June 27, 1998. Its pusher propeller is powered by a Rotax 914 piston engine boosted by a three-stage turbocharger flat-rated to 105 hp (78 kW) to 60,000 ft (18,000 m). It has a 2,500 lb (1,100 kg) maximum weight, is able to carry a 260 lb (120 kg) payload and its 71.5 ft (21.8 m) wing has a high 26:1 aspect ratio. A larger follow-on powered by two Rotax 912 piston engines, the Theseus first flew on May 24, 1996. Designed to fly during 50 hours up to 65,000 ft (20,000 m), the 5,500 (2.5 t) maximum weight UAV was 140 ft (42.7 m) wide and could carry a 340 kg (750 lb) payload.

Grob Strato 2C
Designed to fly at 24,000 m (78,700 ft) and for up to 48 hours, the manned Grob Strato 2C first flew on 31 March 1995 and reached 18,552 m (60,897 ft). The 56.5 m (185 ft) wide aircraft was powered by two 300 kW (400 hp) piston engines turbocharged by a PW127 turboprop as the gas generator.

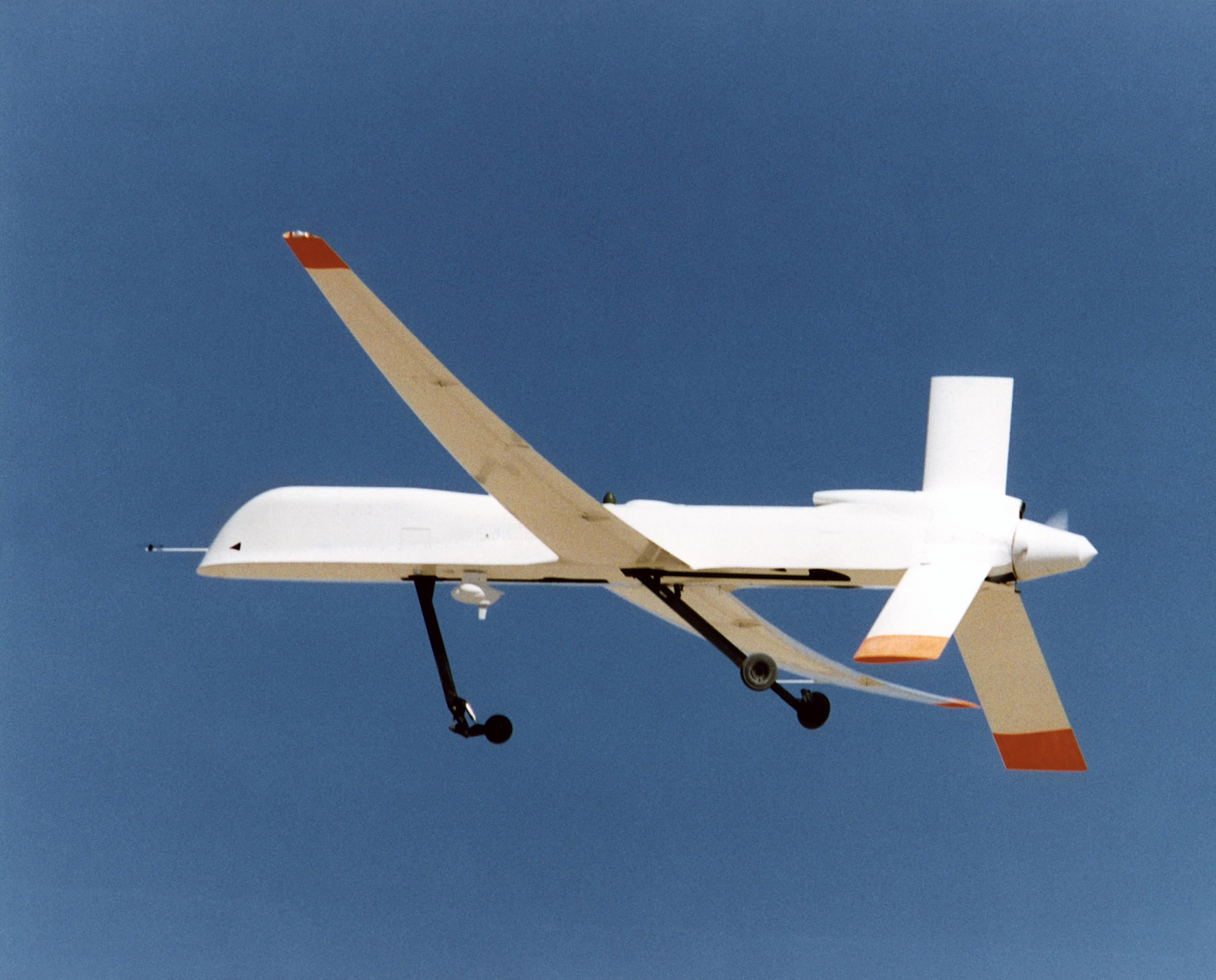
The piston-powered General Atomics Altus II first flew on May 1, 1996, and reached 57,300 ft (17,500 m)

General Atomics ALTUS
Part of the NASA ERAST Program, the high-altitude UAV General Atomics ALTUS I & II were civil variants of the Gnat 750 (which also spawned the USAF Predator A) which had a 48 hours endurance, with a longer wingspan at 55.3 ft (16.9 m). Powered by a 100 hp (75 kW) turbocharged Rotax 912 piston engine, The 2,130 lb (970 kg) MTOW testbed could carry up to 330 lb (150 kg) of scientific instruments. The Altus II first flew on May 1, 1996, had an endurance over 26 hours, and reached a maximum density altitude of 57,300 ft (17,500 m) on March 5, 1999. They led to the larger, turboprop-powered General Atomics Altair.

Scaled Composites Proteus
The manned Scaled Composites Proteus operates at altitudes of 19.8 km (65,000 ft), while carrying a 1,100 kg (2,400 lb) payload. Powered by two Williams FJ44 turbofans, it had tandem wings with a 17 m (55 ft) front wing and a wider 24 m (78 ft) wide back wing for a maximum takeoff weight of 6.6 t (14,500 lb), could cruise at 450 km/h (240 kn) and stay 22 hours at 925 km (500 nmi) of its base.

Virgin Atlantic GlobalFlyer
The manned GlobalFlyer, built by Scaled Composites, was designed to fly around the world. Powered by a single Williams FJ44, the 114 ft (35 m) wide aircraft can weigh up to 22,100 lb (10 t). Having a 50,700 ft (15,450 m) ceiling, it flew for 76 hours and 45 minutes in February 2006.

Aurora Flight Sciences Orion
The initial Boeing/Aurora Flight Sciences Orion platform would cruise at 65,000 ft (20,000 m) for 100 hours, powered by liquid hydrogen feeding piston engines; its takeoff weight of 7,000 lbs (3.2 tons) allowing 400 lbs (180 kg) payloads. It evolved into a twin turbo-diesel-powered MALE UAV burning jet fuel with an increased gross weight to 11,000 lb (5,000 kg), designed to fly at 20,000 ft (6,100 m) during 120 hours (five days) with a 1,000lb payload, or a week with a smaller one; it made its first flight in August 2013 and flew during 80 hours in December 2015, landing with enough fuel for 37 hours more.

Shenyang Aircraft Corporation Divine Eagle
The Divine Eagle, produced by Shenyang Aircraft Corporation, is a large turbofan-powered UAV developed since 2012 and possibly in service by 2018. The twin boom, twin tail aircraft has a canard wing and wind tunnel test were up to a ceiling of 25 km (82,000 ft) and Mach 0.8.

==== Hydrogen fueled ====
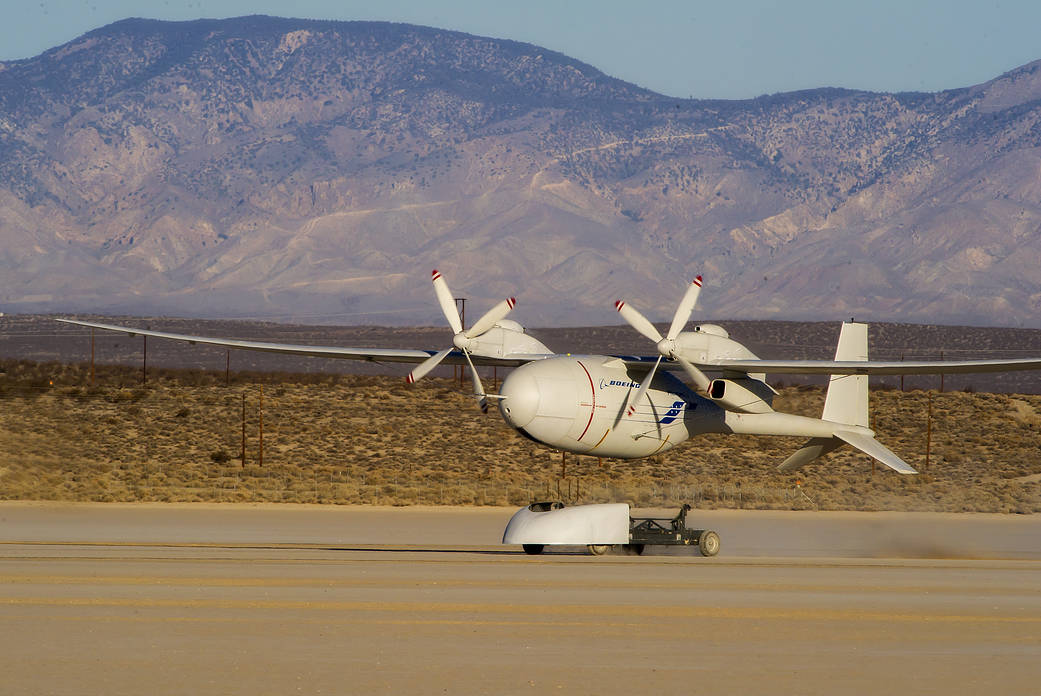
The hydrogen-powered Boeing Phantom Eye should have reached 65,000 ft (19,800 m) during four days.

AeroVironment Global Observer
Fueled by liquid hydrogen and designed to fly at up to 65,000 ft (20,000 m) for up to 7 days, the AeroVironment Global Observer first flew on 5 August 2010. After a crash in April 2011, the Pentagon shelved the project.

Boeing Phantom Eye
An evolution of the Boeing Condor developed by Boeing Phantom Works, the Boeing Phantom Eye first flew in June 2012. Powered by two 150 hp (110 kW) turbocharged Ford 2.3 liter piston engines running on liquid hydrogen, the 150 ft (46 m) wide UAV has a gross takeoff weight of 9,800 lbs (4.4 t) and can carry a 450 lb (200 kg) payload. It cruises at 150 kn (280 km/h), can reach 65,000 ft (19,800 m) and have a four days endurance. A full size variant is designed to carry a 2,000 lb (910 kg) payload during ten days. In August 2016, the Phantom Eye demonstrator was transferred to the Air Force Flight Test Museum.

Stratospheric Platforms
UK Stratospheric Platforms, created in 2014, went public on 19 October 2020; after flight trials of a 4G/5G relay on a Grob G 520 at 45,000 ft (14,000 m), the start-up is developing a hydrogen-fuel cell-powered HAPS UAV built by Scaled Composites, with a wingspan of 60 m (200 ft), that would fly at 60,000 ft (18,000 m) for nine-days with a payload of 140 kg (310 lb).

== Airships ==
Unmanned stratospheric airships are designed to operate at very high 60,000 to 75,000 feet (18.3 to 22.9 km) altitudes during weeks, months or years. Subjected to ultraviolet damage, ozone corrosion and challenging station keeping, they can be solar-powered with energy storage for the night.

The first stratospheric powered airship flight took place in 1969, reaching 70,000 feet (21 km) for 2 hours with a 5 pounds (2.3 kilograms) payload. By August 2002, US company Worldwide Aeros was building a stratospheric demonstrator for the Korea Aerospace Research Institute, as a part the South Korean HAA development program. By April 2004, stratospheric airships were being developed in USA, UK, Canada, Korea and Japan. In May 2004, the Japan Aerospace Exploration Agency shown its test airship in Taiki, Hokkaido, a part of its Stratosphere Platform Project.

SwRI HiSentinel
On December 4, 2005, a team led by Southwest Research Institute (SwRI), sponsored by the Army Space and Missile Defense Command (ASMDC), successfully demonstrated powered flight of the HiSentinel stratospheric airship at an altitude of 74,000 feet (23 km).

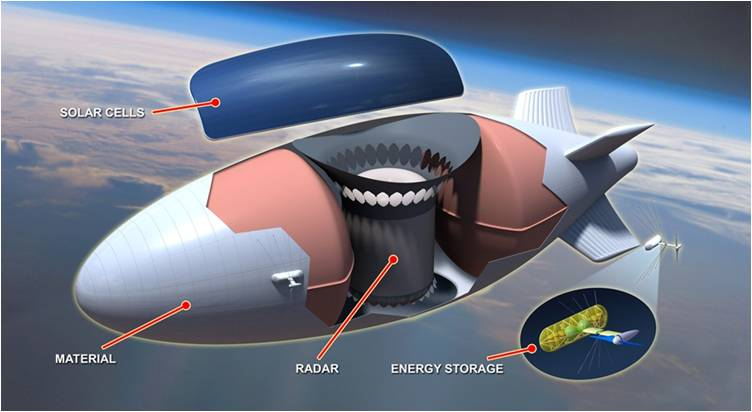
USAF Integrated Sensor Is Structure project

Integrated Sensor Is Structure
The USAF Integrated Sensor Is Structure (ISIS) airship would have stayed for up to ten years at 70,000 ft (21,000 m), providing a persistent early warning against cruise missiles at up to 600 km (320 nmi) or enemy combatants at up to 300 km (160 nmi).

Lockheed-Martin HAA
The United States Department of Defense Missile Defense Agency contracted Lockheed Martin to build an unmanned High-Altitude Airship (HAA) for its Ballistic Missile Defense System. In January 2006, Lockheed won a $149M Contract to build it and demonstrate its technical feasibility and military utility. It would operate above 60,000 ft (18,000 m) in a quasi-geostationary position to deliver persistent orbital station keeping as a surveillance aircraft platform, telecommunications relay, or a weather observer. Launch was originally proposed in 2008, the production aircraft would be 500 ft (150 m) long and 150 ft (46 m) in diameter. Powered by solar cells, it would stay in the air for up to one month and was intended to survey a 600 mi (970 km) diameter of land.

Lockheed-Martin HALE-D
On July 27, 2011, the "High Altitude Long Endurance-Demonstrator" (HALE-D) subscale demonstrator was launched on a test flight. HALE-D had a 500,000 ft^{3} (14,000 m^{3}) volume, was 240 ft (73 m) long and 70 ft (21 m) wide, had 15 kW (20 hp) solar cells charging 40 kWh Li-ion batteries and 2 kW (2.7 hp) electric motors to cruise at 20 kn (37 km/h) TAS at 60,000 ft (18,000 m) with a 50 lb (23 kg) payload during 15 days. At 32,000 ft (9,800 m) a problem with the helium levels prevented it and the flight was terminated. It descended and crashed in a Pittsburgh area forest. Two days after, it was destroyed by a fire before its recovery.

Lindstrand HALE airship
Lindstrand Technologies designed a Helium-filled non-rigid airship covered with solar cells. The 14 t (31,000 lb) aircraft could carry a 500 kg (1,100 lb) payload during 3 to 5 years as helium loss would be minimal at high altitudes. For energy storage, a 180kW electrolyser would fill H2 and O2 tanks, to be converted back to water by a 150kW fuel cell. An 80 kW (110 hp) motor would allow a 24 m/s (47 kn) maximum speed.

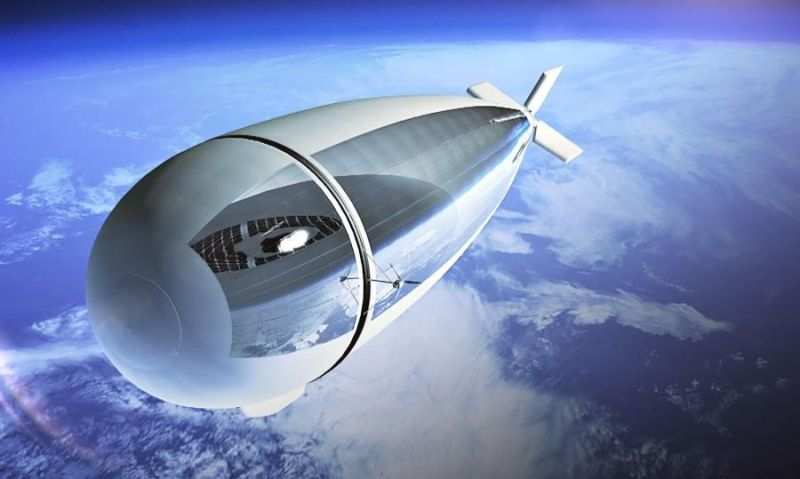
Stratobus airship

Thales Alenia Stratobus
Thales Alenia Space develops the Stratobus unmanned, solar-powered stratospheric airship, 377 ft (115 m) long and weighting 15,000 lb (6,800 kg) including a 550 lb (250 kg) payload, it is designed for a five-year mission with annual servicing and a prototype was planned for late 2020.

H-Aero
H-Aero LTA-based launch systems for Mars exploration, with development taking place via terrestrial high-altitude platforms. The first systems were tested by 2021.

Stratoship SZ-155
The SZ-155 was designed and manufactured by Stratoship in Australia. The SZ-155 flew two low altitude test flights in 2022 and 2024 before reaching the stratosphere on its first high altitude flight on May 5th, 2025. It flew for 11 hours and 12 minutes in total, and spent over 8 hours in the stratosphere. The SZ-155 is 25 meters long and was designed for flights of up to 7 days endurance. It can carry up to 10kg of payload to the stratosphere. Stratoship is currently designing a future model for multi-month flights.

== Balloons ==
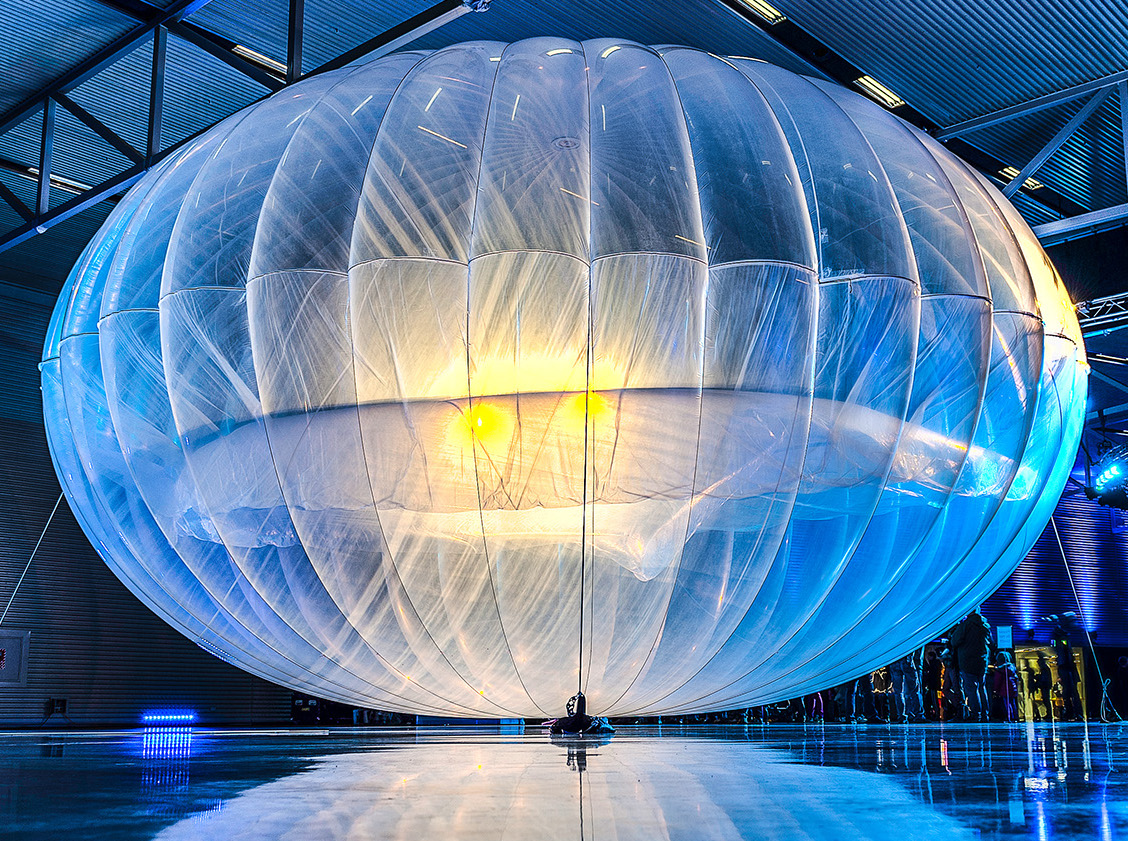
A Google Project Loon balloon

A geostationary balloon satellite (GBS) flies in the stratosphere (60,000 to 70,000 ft (18 to 21 km) above sea level) at a fixed point over the Earth's surface. At that altitude the air has 1/10 of its density is at sea level. A GBS could be used to provide broadband Internet access over a large area. One prior project was the Google's Project Loon, which envisioned using helium-filled high-altitude balloons.

== Rotorcraft ==
Boeing A160 Hummingbird
The Boeing A160 Hummingbird is a rotorcraft produced by Boeing. First flown in 2002, the program had goals of a 24-hour endurance, and 30,000 ft (9,100 m) altitude, but was abandoned in December 2012.

== See also ==
- Aerobot
