= Aurora Odysseus =

Solar drone developed by Aurora Flight Sciences

Odysseus

General information
- Type: HALE UAV
- National origin: United States
- Manufacturer: Aurora Flight Sciences

The Odysseus is a solar, High-Altitude Long Endurance drone developed by Aurora Flight Sciences.

== Development ==
Aurora Flight Sciences announced the Odysseus in November 2018. In spring 2019, Aurora planned to fly a High-Altitude Long Endurance drone powered by solar cells and batteries, Odysseus, to study the Earth atmosphere or as a military pseudo-satellite for intelligence, surveillance and reconnaissance. The 74.1 m (243 ft) wide carbon fibre aircraft should weigh less than a 880 kg (1,940 lb) Smart Car, can carry a 25 kg (55 lb) payload with 250W provided during several months of endurance. It would compete with the Airbus Zephyr ordered by the UK Ministry of Defence and visited by the U.S. Army Futures Command, the BAE Systems-Prismatic Ltd UAV, and the AeroVironment-SoftBank telecommunications UAV. The bendable wing has fiberglass upper skin panels and plastic film undersides, three tails and six propellers, with roll controlled by the outboard tails. It used available, low-risk, lithium polymer batteries and gallium arsenide thin-film solar cells and first test flights were to be powered by batteries only. It was designed to stay day and night above 65,000 ft (20,000 m) up to three months at latitudes up to 20°. First flight was planned for April 2019 in Puerto Rico, before investigating ozone depletion in the summer over the US Midwest. Its first flight was indefinitely delayed by July 2019.

== See also ==
- AeroVironment Global Observer
- Airbus Zephyr
- Aurora Flight Sciences Orion
- Boeing SolarEagle
- Facebook Aquila
