= HAPSMobile =

American company

- Founded: 2017
- Headquarters: Tokyo Proper
- Services: Airborne cell phone networks
- Parent: SoftBank
- Website: www.hapsmobile.com

HAPSMobile is a wholly owned subsidiary of SoftBank planning to operate High Altitude Platform Station (HAPS) networks. HAPSMobile is developing the Hawk30 (Sunglider) solar-powered unmanned aircraft for stratospheric telecommunications.

== Hawk30 ==
HAPSMobile Hawk30

=== Development ===
On January 3, 2018, AeroVironment announced it would design and develop a solar-powered, high-altitude, unmanned aircraft and associated ground control stations for a joint venture with Japanese telco SoftBank (95%) for $65 million.

In November 2018, the NASA Armstrong Flight Research Center at Edwards AFB in California was selected to provide ground and range safety for the project up to 10,000 ft for $791,600.

On April 25, 2019, the stratospheric Hawk30 was rolled out for the joint venture. Commercial operations are expected to begin in 2023, operating year-round at latitudes 30° north and south of the equator.

AeroVironment's design development investment increased by $39 million to $129 million, and a later Hawk50 model would allow operations from 50° north and south of the equator, to cover Japan and North America.

The same day, SoftBank invested $125 million in Loon, a subsidiary of Google parent Alphabet, that developed high-altitude balloons for internet connectivity between 2011 and 2021. It will make a similar investment in HAPSMobile, collaborating on common ground stations, communications payloads and can share network connectivity in flight.

In August 2019, the FAA allowed the HAWK30 to fly in the stratosphere above Hawaii in FY2019, within the Pan-Pacific UAS Test Range Complex. On September 11, the prototype Hawk30 first flew at low altitude in restricted airspace at the NASA Armstrong Flight Research Center. Stratospheric flight tests up to 65,000 ft are expected to start before March 31, 2020, from the Hawaiian island of Lanai. Built in Simi Valley, California, the HAWK30 made its first flight and was tested at the Spaceport America in New Mexico instead, as the local Economic Development Department provided $500,000 in subsidies.

On 21–22 September 2020, the HAPSMobile Hawk30 (rebranded as Sunglider) flew 20 hours from Spaceport America, and reached an altitude of 62,500 ft (19.1 km) on its fifth demonstration flight. It tested the long-distance LTE communications developed with Loon for standard LTE smartphones and wireless broadband communications.

=== Design ===
The Hawk30 flying-wing is a development of the NASA Pathfinder and NASA Helios high-altitude, long-endurance unmanned aircraft built by AeroVironment for NASA. Resembling the 1999 Helios, the tailless aircraft is a 256 ft (78 m) span flying wing with 10 electric-driven propellers. Orbiting at 65,000 ft (20,000 m), it is solar-powered by day and battery-powered by night to stay aloft for up to six months initially. The aircraft's service life is planned to be two years and its time on station may be extended by 1–2 months with experience. The aircraft will be remotely piloted for the ascent and descent, and operate autonomously once cruising in the stratosphere. The HAWK30 cruises at 59 kn (109 km/h).

The system would provide 4G LTE and 5G direct to devices over a 200 km (120 mi) diameter area, and 40 aircraft could cover the entire Japanese archipelago. It should be interoperable with terrestrial cell towers to expand their coverage and as a proxy for the SoftBank-backed OneWeb satellite constellation, when it is not suited for providing links directly to devices.

== See also ==
- Electric aircraft
- History of unmanned aerial vehicles
- NASA Pathfinder (First flew in June 1983)
- NASA Centurion (First flight 10 November 1998)
- NASA/AeroVironment Helios Prototype (First flight 8 September 1999)
- QinetiQ/Airbus Zephyr (First flight in 2008)
- Facebook Aquila (First flight 28 June 2016)
- BAE Systems PHASA-35 (First flight 17 February 2020)
