= Boeing Phantom Eye =

Proposed unmanned aerial vehicle

Phantom Eye
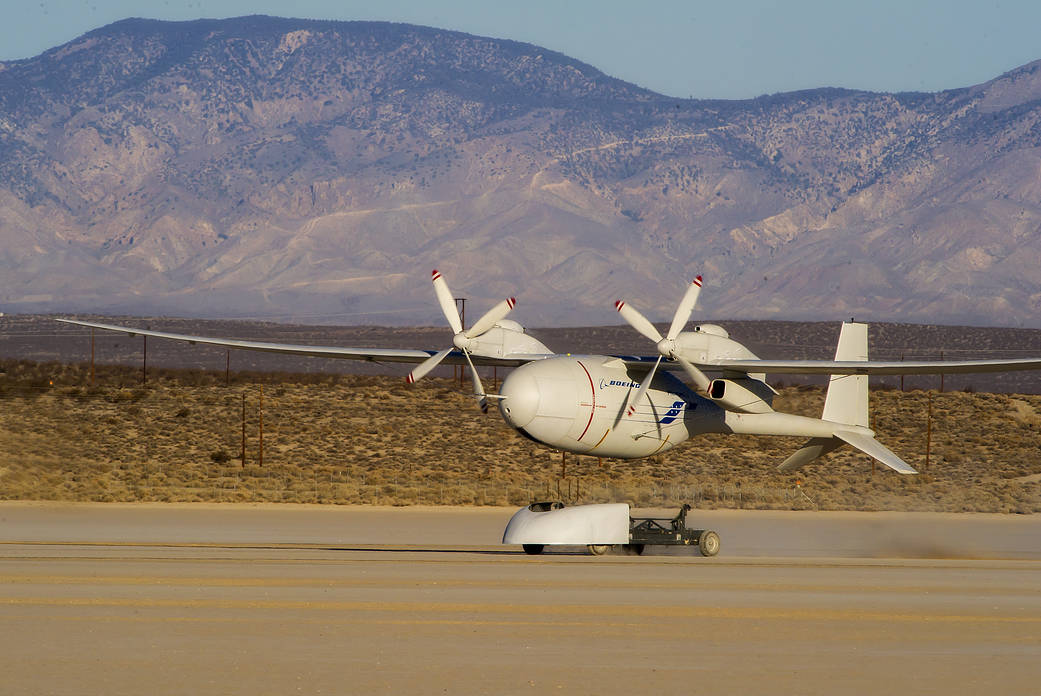

General information
- Type: High altitude, long endurance unmanned aerial vehicle
- National origin: United States
- Manufacturer: Boeing
- Status: Museum piece

History
- First flight: June 1, 2012

The Boeing Phantom Eye is a high altitude, long endurance (HALE) liquid hydrogen-powered unmanned aerial vehicle developed by Boeing Phantom Works. The aircraft was Boeing's proposal to meet the demand from the US military for unmanned drones designed to provide advanced intelligence and reconnaissance work, driven by the combat conditions in Afghanistan in particular. In August 2016, the Phantom Eye demonstrator was disassembled for display at the Air Force Flight Test Museum.

== Development ==
The Phantom Eye was an evolution from Boeing's earlier success with the piston-powered Boeing Condor that set several records for altitude and endurance in the late 1980s. Boeing also studied a larger HALE UAV that can fly for over 10 days and carry payloads of 450 pounds (204 kg) or more; the company also worked on the Phantom Ray UAV as a flying testbed for advanced technologies.

Phantom Eye's propulsion system successfully completed an 80-hour test in an altitude chamber on March 1, 2010; this cleared the way for the propulsion system and the airframe to be assembled. Boeing worked closely with Ball Aerospace, Aurora Flight Sciences, Ford Motor Co. and MAHLE Powertrain to develop the Phantom Eye. The Phantom Eye was revealed to the press at a ceremony at Boeing's facilities in St Louis, Missouri, on July 12, 2010. The Phantom Eye demonstrator is a 60–70% scale design of an objective system. According to Darryl Davis, president of Boeing's Phantom Works advanced concepts group, the Phantom Eye demonstrator could lead to an objective system capable of achieving 24-hour-a-day, seven-day-a-week coverage of an area year round with as few as four aircraft.

=== Flight testing ===
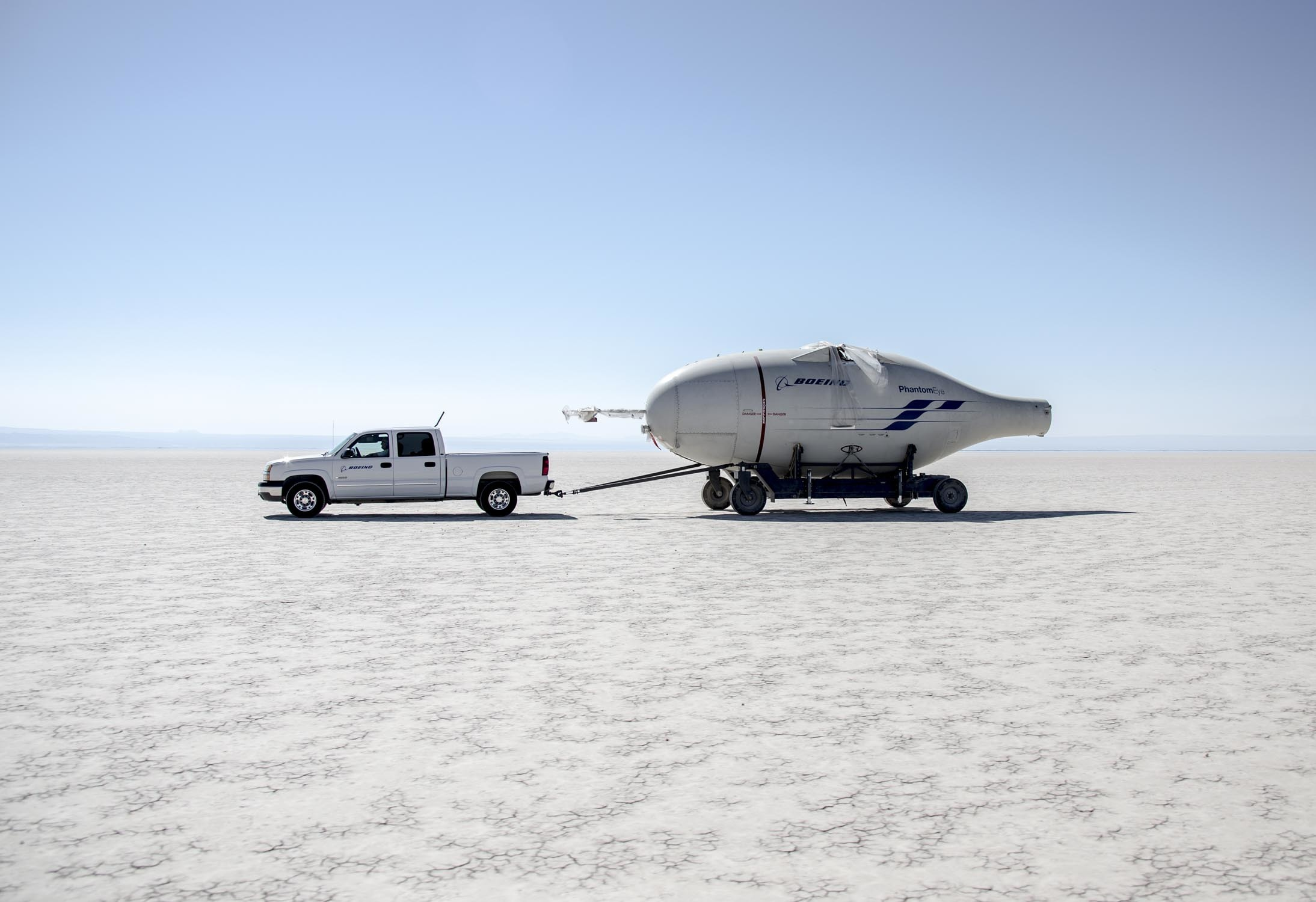
NASA employees moving the disassembled Phantom Eye across Rogers Dry Lake

The demonstrator was shipped to NASA's Dryden Flight Research Center at Edwards Air Force Base, California, for ground tests. It conducted its first medium-speed taxi test there on March 10, 2012, reaching speeds of 30 knots (35 mph; 56 km/h). Boeing declared the test a success and said it paved the way for the aircraft's first flight, expected to last 8 hours.

The Phantom Eye completed its first flight on June 1, 2012 at Edwards Air Force Base. It reached an altitude of 4,000 ft and a speed of 62 knots (71 mph; 115 km/h) for 28 minutes. Its landing gear dug into the dry lakebed during landing and caused some damage to the aircraft. On February 6, 2013, the Phantom Eye completed taxi testing at Edwards Air Force Base in preparation for the second flight. Sitting atop a launch cart, it reached speeds of 46 mph. In response to the first flight test, autonomous flight systems were upgraded and the landing system was improved. The Phantom Eye completed its second flight on February 25, 2013 at Edwards Air Force Base. It climbed to an altitude of 8,000 ft at a cruising speed of 62 knots (71 mph; 115 km/h) for 66 minutes. The second flight test ended with a successful landing.

On 6 June 2013, Boeing was issued a $6.8 million contract by the U.S. Missile Defense Agency to install an unidentified payload on the Phantom Eye demonstrator. The payload was most likely a long-range sensing and tracking system required to aim a laser. The Phantom Eye's fourth flight occurred on June 14, 2013, reaching an altitude of 20,000 ft for 4 hours. On September 14, 2013, its fifth flight reached an altitude of 28,000 ft for nearly four and a half hours. Although the flight test was deemed a success, sources claim that the test had originally been intended to reach a 40,000 ft altitude. The fifth flight incorporated a payload from the Missile Defense Agency. The sixth flight occurred on January 6, 2014 and lasted for 5 hours, longer than any previous flight.

In February 2014, the Phantom Eye was promoted to experimental status by the Air Force's 412th Operations Group on recommendation from NASA’s Dryden Flight Research Center. The Phantom Eye had by then undergone six test flights and met NASA safety criteria. Classification as experimental under the USAF Test Center meant it was no longer restricted to flying above Edwards AFB and would move to a test range several miles away to further test endurance and altitude capabilities. In the coming months, Boeing planned test the demonstrator to reach its desired operating altitude of 60,000 ft (18,000 m) and increase its endurance; a full-size operational Phantom Eye was planned to be built to reach endurance goals of 7–10 days airborne if successful.

The demonstrator's ninth flight occurred in 2014 for 8–9 hours at 54,000 ft, then it was placed in storage at NASA’s Armstrong Flight Research Center. Boeing looked for opportunities in the military or commercial sectors to continue development. Initially pitched as a high-flying satellite surrogate for ground surveillance or communications relay, the company looked to see if a solid-state laser could be mounted to perform missile defense; a solid-state laser is desired over chemical lasers, like the one used in Boeing's previous YAL-1 Airborne Laser Testbed, because there is a shorter logistical tail and less time is needed to recharge and cool.

=== Museum display ===
On 17 August 2016, the Air Force transferred the disassembled Phantom Eye demonstrator for reassembly and refurbishment to be put on display at the Air Force Flight Test Museum. Boeing had been in talks with military and commercial organizations in hopes of returning the aircraft to service after flight trials had concluded in September 2014 after conducting nine sorties, but did not have success. The company had hoped to construct a 40% larger version that could stay airborne for 10 days with a 1,000 lb (450 kg) payload or 7 days with a 2,000 lb payload, but the retirement of the prototype leaves that prospect unclear.

== Design ==
The Phantom Eye demonstrator had a 150-foot (46 meter) wingspan. Boeing stated that it could fly for up to four days at a time at altitudes of up to 65,000 feet. Boeing also stated that the Phantom Eye demonstrator was able to carry a 450-pound payload and have a cruising speed of 150 knots. The Phantom Eye carries no armament and is for "persistent intelligence and surveillance".

=== Propulsion ===
Each of the two propulsion systems consisted of modified Ford 2.3 liter engines, reduction gearbox, and 4-blade propeller. The engines were originally designed for use with some models of the petrol-burning Ford Fusion car. To be able to run in the oxygen starved atmosphere at 65,000 ft, the engines featured a multiple turbocharger system that compresses that available low density air and reduces the radiated infrared heat signature to increase its stealth properties. The engines, which provided 150 horsepower at sea level, were tuned so as to be able to run on hydrogen. Boeing's marketing department stated that this will make the aircraft economical and "green" to run, as the only by-product would be water.

=== Other functions ===
Although the primary role of the Phantom Eye was airborne surveillance, Boeing pitched it as a communications relay for the U.S. Navy. It would have a role in the Navy without taking up space on an aircraft carrier with long-range reconnaissance still provided by the MQ-4C Triton. A pair of Phantom Eyes, one relieving the other after days of constant flight, could provide the Navy with continuous long range communications.

== See also ==
- Global Observer, a hydrogen-powered surveillance aircraft
- Orion, a conventionally-powered long-endurance UAV
