= Integrated Sensor is Structure =

Military research program

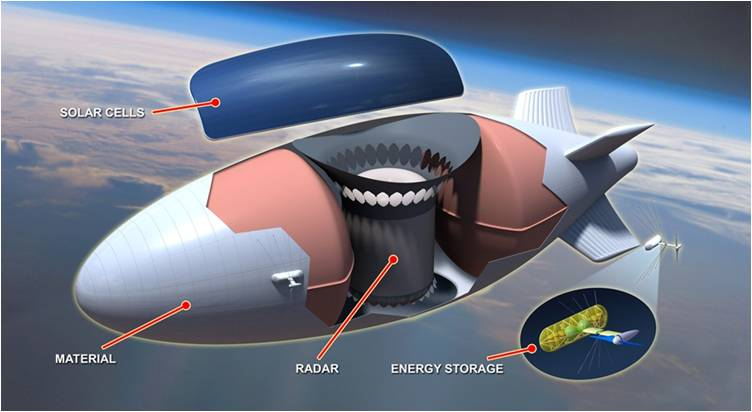

The Integrated Sensor is Structure (ISIS) was a program managed by the United States Air Force (USAF) Research Laboratory to research the feasibility of using an unmanned airship as a high-altitude aerial reconnaissance and surveillance platform. It is sometimes called Integrated Sensor is the Structure, as a fundamental innovation was the use of the airship structure as the sensing component of a state-of-the-art radar system.

In 2006, contracts were awarded to Raytheon for development of a large-area, light, Active electronically scanned array antenna which could be bonded to the structure of a blimp, Northrop Grumman for antenna development, and Lockheed Martin for development of the airship. As proposed, the 450-foot (140 m)-long surveillance airship could be launched from the US and stationed for up to 10 years at an altitude of 65,000 feet (20,000 m), observing the movement of vehicles, aircraft, and people below. At that altitude, the airship would be beyond the range of most surface-to-air and air-to-air missiles. The airship would be filled with helium and powered, at least in part, by solar-powered hydrogen fuel cells.

On March 12, 2009, the USAF announced that it had budgeted $400 million for work on ISIS . In April 2009, DARPA awarded a $399.9 million contract to Lockheed Martin as the systems integrator and Raytheon as the radar developer for phase three of the project: the construction of a one-third scale model, which would remain in the air for up to a year. The ultimate goal was to provide radar capable of delivering persistent, wide-area surveillance tracking and engagement of air targets within a 600-kilometer area and ground targets within a 300-mile (480 km) area, according to DARPA. The model blimp was to have radar coverage of about 7,176 square yards (6,000 square meters) and be tested at an altitude of 6 miles (9.7 km) above the ground. The contract initially awarded $100 million to the two companies, with the rest to follow in phases, with a completion date of March 2013.

As of 2012, the development of the airframe had been delayed to focus on "radar risk reduction". The United States Department of Defense ended the program in 2015. $471 million had been spent from 2007 through 2012.

== See also ==
- Buoyancy compensator (aviation)
- High-altitude platform station
- TCOM Blue Devil
