= Titan Aerospace =

American UAV manufacturer

- Type: Private
- Founded: 2011
- Founder: Max Yaney
- Key people: Vern Raburn (CEO)
- Parent: Google

Titan Aerospace was an American aerospace company based in Moriarty, New Mexico from 2013–2014. They intended to develop and manufacture unmanned aerial vehicles.

The company was acquired by Google in 2016, who planned to use Titan Aerospace to develop unmanned aerial vehicles capable of bringing Internet connectivity to remote parts of the world. Google announced its decision to stop working on the project in January 2017.

== History ==
The company was founded in 2011 by Max Yaney. Vern Raburn, founder of the now-defunct Eclipse Aviation, joined Titan Aerospace in 2013 as its CEO. Previous to his tenure at Eclipse, Raburn was CEO of Symantec and had been an early employee of Microsoft during its start-up phase.

According to Manager Magazine at the beginning of March 2014 Facebook had offered $60 million to buy the company. Techcrunch further reported that Facebook wanted to use the drones to supply areas having no internet connection with affordable network access.

In mid-April 2014, it was announced that Google had bought Titan Aerospace. "Project Titan" was part of Google's Access division before being absorbed into the semi-secret R&D facility X during the Alphabet reshuffle in 2015, and was shut down in 2016.

== Product ==
Solara 50

The company intended to manufacture unmanned aircraft under the designation AtmoSat. The so-called "atmospheric satellites" or Solar Powered Atmospheric Satellite Drones were predicted to travel up to 20 kilometers high and to have satellite-typical functions. Equipped with a solar power system they were projected to, according to Titan Aerospace, fly continuously up to five years and thereby cover four million kilometers.

=== Types ===
- Solara 50, with 50-meter wingspan and 15 meters in length, was presented at the fair AUVSI's Unmanned Systems in Washington. Solara 50 was projected to accommodate a payload of 32 kilograms.
- Solara 60, with a payload of more than 100 kg., was a predicted follow-on development.

The Solara AtmoSat platform promised customers around the world real-time images of the earth, voice and data services, navigation and mapping of services and monitoring systems of the atmosphere. The systems hoped to provide signal coverage over 17,800 square kilometers, giving a hypothetical Solara drone greater coverage than 100 terrestrial cell towers.

=== First and only test flight ===
On May 1, 2015, the sole SOLARA 50, registration number N950TA, flew for four minutes and sixteen seconds before impacting the ground following an in-flight structural failure. The aircraft reached an altitude of approximately 520 feet above ground level.

== See also ==
- List of mergers and acquisitions by Google
