= Facebook Aquila =

Experimental solar-powered drone developed by Facebook

Aquila

General information
- Type: Atmospheric satellite
- National origin: United Kingdom (UK)
- Manufacturer: Facebook; Ascenta
- Number built: 2

History
- First flight: 28 June 2016
- Retired: 26 June 2018

The Facebook Aquila was an experimental solar-powered drone developed by Facebook for use as an atmospheric satellite, intended to act as relay stations for providing internet access to remote areas. The Aquila first flew on 28 June 2016, with a second aircraft successfully flying in 2017. Internal development of the Aquila aircraft was stopped in June 2018.

== Development ==
Aquila was developed by Facebook's Connectivity Lab. The prototype airframe design and construction was led by Ascenta, a Somerset, England-based company acquired by Facebook in 2014. Several scale models of the Aquila were built and flown to prove the concept prior to the full-scale prototype being built.

Following construction at Ascenta's factory in Bridgwater, England, the Aquila prototype was disassembled and shipped to Arizona, where it was first flown on 28 June 2016. The 96-minute flight was considered successful. However, during landing, the aircraft touched down short of the intended landing zone and was damaged; the National Transportation Safety Board conducted an investigation into the accident, as the drone suffered a structural failure just before touching down. The aircraft was designed such that a production version would be able to support continuous flight in the stratosphere for 90 days.

Following the crash, the Aquila design was modified with wing spoilers, additional flight and structural sensors, revised autopilot software, a smoother finish, and a mechanism intended to stop and lock the propellers in a horizontal position before landing. A second prototype flew successfully on 22 May 2017 for one hour and 46 minutes.

In November 2017, a partnership with Airbus was announced to further develop Aquila and the "high altitude platform station broadband connectivity system" (HAPS) project. The same month, it was announced that Aquila would be displayed at the Victoria and Albert Museum during its 2018 exhibition, "The Future Starts Here".

In June 2018, as aerospace manufacturers started designing and building HAPS, Facebook decided to stop its program to work with partners like Airbus on HAPS connectivity and their technologies like flight control and high-density batteries. In 2018, it was reported that Facebook and Airbus scheduled test flights in Australia using the latter's Zephyr drone technology. Zephyr shares the same blueprint with Aquila as it also uses solar power.

== Design ==
The drone had a wingspan roughly the same as an Airbus A400M Atlas, and had a maximum gross weight of 937 pounds (425 kg). Aquila was of flying wing configuration, the upper surface of the wing being covered in solar cells to power the aircraft's four electric motors; batteries, composing half the aircraft's weight, provided power storage for night flight. Aquila was claimed to use the same amount of power as three blow dryers. While the prototype used a launch trolley to become airborne, production Aquilas were intended to be launched using helium balloons, carrying the aircraft to their operational height and releasing them; landings would have taken place on grassy surfaces.

Aquila was intended to fly at altitudes of up to 90,000 feet (27,000 m) during the day, dropping to 60,000 feet (18,000 m) at night, with an endurance of up to three months, providing Internet service to a 50 miles (80 km)-radius area below its flight path; if communications spectrum was assigned for the project, it would allow the 66% of Earth's surface that has poor or no internet access to be connected. The technology, which used high-bandwidth lasers to beam the Internet to remote locations, was intended to provide access to 4 billion users, particularly in sub-Saharan Africa.

== Specifications (Aquila 1A, N565AQ) ==
Data from sources in the text above, except where otherwise noted.

General characteristics

- Crew: None
- Wingspan: 140 ft (43 m)
- Gross weight: 937 lb (425 kg)

Performance

- Planned operating altitude: 60,000 to 90,000 ft (18,000 to 27,000 m)

== See also ==
- Project Loon

Aircraft of comparable role, configuration, and era

- NASA Pathfinder (first flew in 1983)
- NASA Centurion (first flight 10 November 1998)
- NASA/AeroVironment Helios Prototype (first flight 8 September 1999)
- QinetiQ/Airbus Zephyr (first flew in December 2005)
- SoftBank/AeroVironment HAPSMobile (first flight 11 September 2019)
- BAE Systems PHASA-35 (first flew in February 2020)

Related lists

- List of electric aircraft
