= CAPECON project =

EU project to develop UAVs

The CAPECON project (civil UAV applications and economic effectivity of potential configuration solutions) was a European Union initiative to develop UAVs.

The project ran from 1 May 2002 to 31 December 2005. The total cost was €5,136,539, the EU providing towards this €2,899,992. Overall coordination of the project was via Israel Aircraft Industries Ltd (Israel Aerospace Industries). Eighteen Organisations were involved (not including Israel Aerospace Industries), six of these were academic organisations: Polytechnic University of Turin (Politecnico di Torino), Technion (Israel Institute of Technology), University of Bologna, Warsaw University of Technology, University of Naples Federico II (Universita degli studi di Napoli Federico II), and the University of Salento (Universita degli studi di Lecce), four were aerospace agencies: Instituto Nacional de Técnica Aeroespacial (Spain), Office National d'Etudes et de Recherches Aérospatiales (France), Stichting Nationaal Lucht - en Ruimtevaart Laboratorium (Netherlands), CIRA (Italian Aerospace Research Center). Other organisations involved were Agusta, Carlo Gavazzi Space S.P.A., EADS Defence and Security Systems, Eurocopter Deutschland GmbH, Eurocopter S.A.S., Swedish Space Corporation, Tadiran Electronic Systems Ltd, &, Tadiran Spectralink.
