= Hybrid-Airplane Technology H-Aero =

German hybrid electric aircraft unmanned aerial vehicle

H-Aero
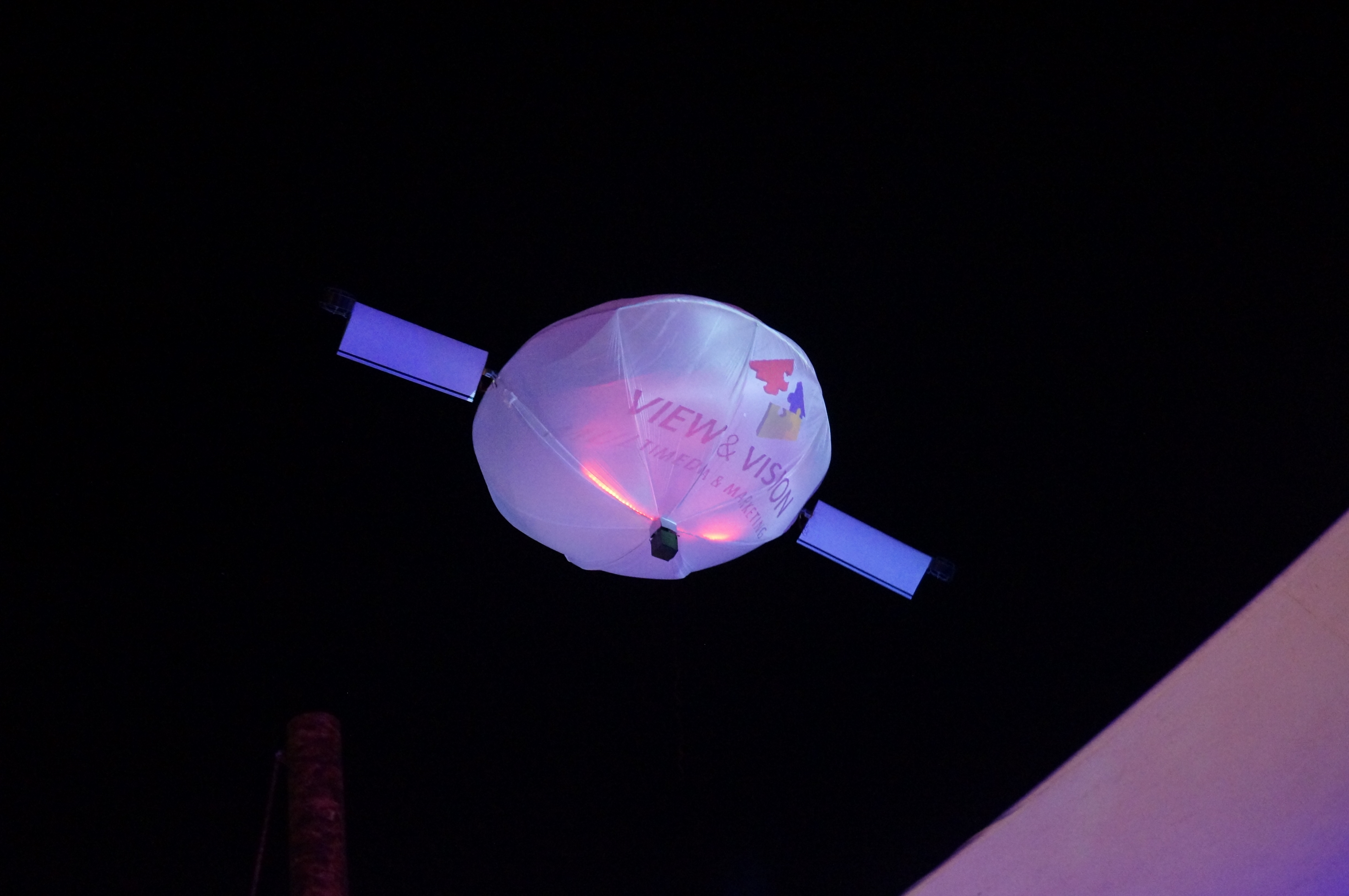

General information
- Type: Hybrid electric aircraft, unmanned aerial vehicle
- National origin: Germany
- Manufacturer: Hybrid-Airplane Technology GmbH
- Status: In production (2021)

History
- Introduction date: 1 June 2016

The Hybrid-Airplane Technology H-Aero (styled as H-AERO) is a small German hybrid electric unmanned aerial vehicle UAV by a Baden-Baden based start-up Hybrid-Airplane Technology GmbH. Compared to some other UAVs it features vertical take-off and landing and extended flight endurance.

== Development ==
The prototype H-Aero One, which can source its energy completely from renewable sources via solar cells, was first presented to the public at ILA Berlin Air Show from 1–4 June 2016. The aerial vehicle was developed by Csaba Singer in co-operation with the University of Stuttgart. Csaba Singer studied aerospace engineering at the University of Stuttgart. After graduating, he did his doctorate at the German Aerospace Centre on renewable energy technology.

The prototype and pre start-up phase was sponsored by public funds from "EXIST", an initiative for scientific transfer administered by the German Federal Ministry for Economic Affairs and Energy. In June 2012 the jury of the NASA-Congress "Concepts and Approaches for Mars Exploration" praised the concept, among others, as an alternative way of exploring Mars from a bird's eye perspective and invited Singer to present his concept in Houston.

At U.T.SEC - Unmanned Technologies & Security, Messe Nürnberg, 2–3 March 2017, the production-ready version of the H-Aero One was shown. The H-Aero One first flew publicly at the CeBIT 2017 in Hannover.

The Ministry of Economy, Labour and Housing Baden-Württemberg awarded it the Innovation Prize in Stuttgart, 2019.

In October 2020, a jury of experts from the fields of business, science, society and politics selected the H-Aero as one of the finalists and awarded it the German Mobility Prize.

== Design ==
The aerial vehicle combines static and dynamic lift, mirror or symmetric rotation flight modes and flies like a balloon, airplane and helicopter. It has a gas cell and two wings with a symmetric profile which can be rotated by 180° and one Electric motor at the end of each wing. As usual with balloons, the static lift vector (buoyant gas) and the vector of payload with batteries are positioned opposed to each other. The cell does not resemble a cigar form but a rotation-symmetric Frisbee disc. The vectors of the carried components - unlike with airships - are not distributed over the total length of the body between prow, cabin and stern. Opposed to this hybrid universal aircraft shows high potentials to more efficient sustainable flight missions and therefore applications with longer abidance in the air.

The aircraft has a cell of a diameter of three metres, can take off and land vertically (VTOL), like a helicopter and fly like an airplane. Cruise speed is about 20 km/h and maximum altitude up to 4000 metres. With an empty weight of 4.4 kg, the H-Aero One can lift payloads of up to three kilograms. Helium provides H-Aero with its static lift, enabling a duration of up to nine hours. H-Aero can be steered via radio modem, cellular network (GPRS, 3G, 4G, LTE) or within a closed room by Wireless LAN.

H-Aero is intended as an observation platform, for filming or also as a reusable Weather balloon. Larger versions, currently under development, will enable the quick establishment of mobile communication networks.

== Hybrid airplane models ==
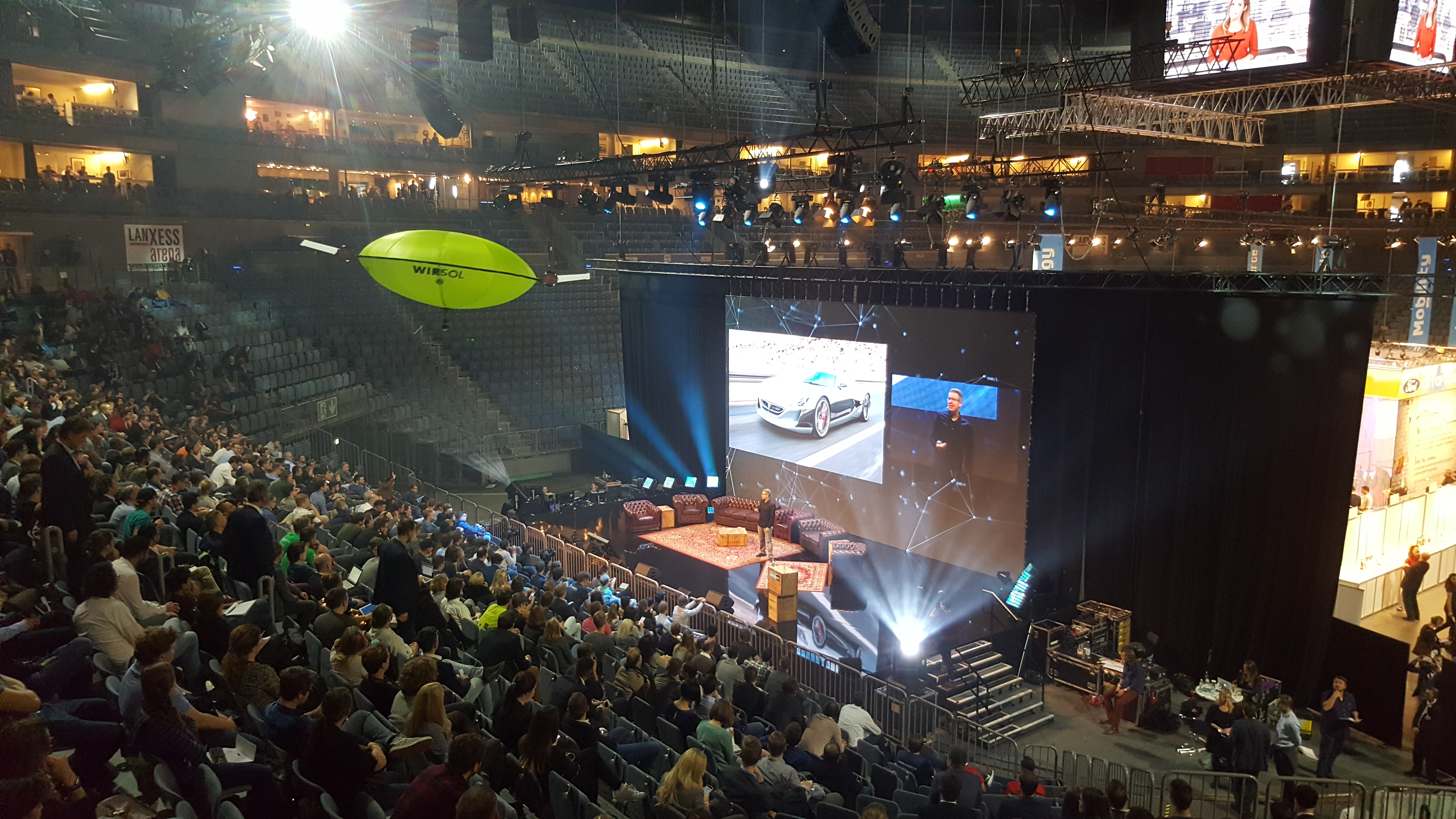
H-Aero-Zero Startupcon Köln 2017

=== H-Aero Zero ===
The H-Aero Zero is the smallest model with a wingspan of 3 meters, 2qm Volume at sealevel and is suitable for indoor and outdoor applications at wind speeds of up to 10 km/h including gusts. With a payload of up to 550 grams and a top speed of 10 km/h, the Zero can stay in the air for up to 160 minutes.

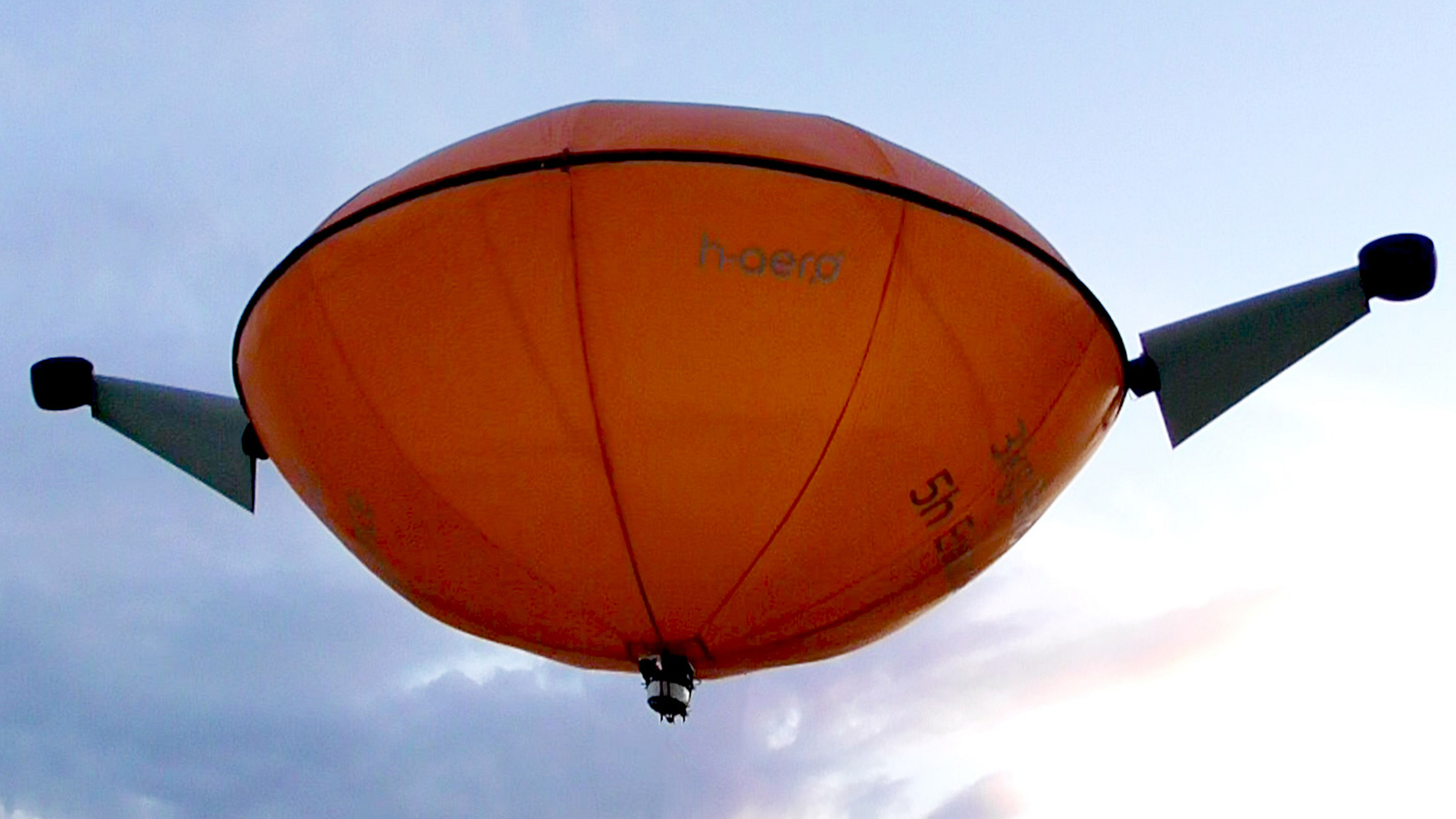
H-Aero-One Stuttgart 2017

=== H-Aero One ===
The H-Aero One has a diameter of 5 meters and can carry up to 3 kilograms at sealevel for up to 400 minutes. With a top speed of 15 km/h, it is suitable for indoor and outdoor applications with a headwind of up to 10 km/h including gusts of wind.

=== H-Aero Zero Plus ===
In 2018, the company developed the h-aero zero+ with a payload capacity of 1.2 kg. Both indoor and outdoor operations were tested, for example, in 2019 at Frankfurt Airport as support for ground staff and above the industrial estate of the Sonnenbühl municipality to track thermal emissions from the industrial plant. In 2020, during the COVID-19 pandemic, the system was used for digital trade fairs and served as a floating camera for broadcasting.

== Use ==
H-Aero can be used as a surveillance platform, for camera flights or even as a reusable weather balloon. In the larger versions currently under development, it will later help in the short-term provision of communication networks. The H-Aero can be used as it is for industrial inspections, such as aircraft inspections or shaft and tunnel inspections, as well as for agricultural and forestry inspections.

== Awards ==
- Innovation award, Deutsche Luft- und Raumfahrt 2017, Finalist in the category emissions reduction
- European Satellite Navigation Competition (ESNC), Baden-Württemberg Challenge, LiveEO – Integration of autonomous UAV "h-aero"“ constellations into satellite services for real-time Earth Observation 2017, Platz 2
- Copernicus Masters, LiveEO – UAV Integration into Satellite-EO 2017, Platz 1
- Award of the label “Member of Solar Impulse Efficient Solution” of the Solar Impulse Foundation, June 2018
- Winner of the Innovation Prize of the State of Baden-Württemberg 2019
- Winner of the German Mobility Award October 2020
