= Boeing Condor =

Experimental unmanned air vehicle

Condor
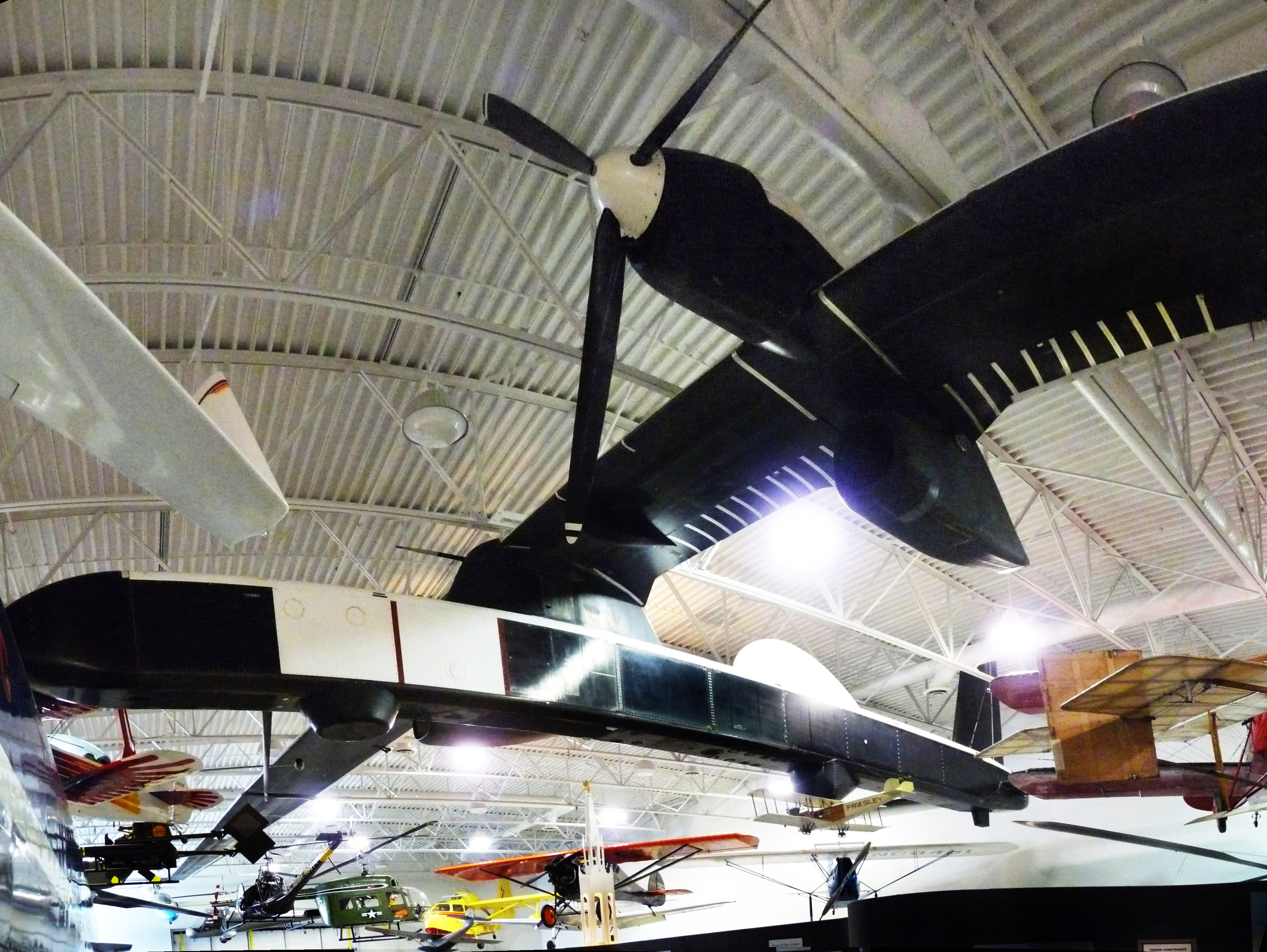
- Condor on display at the Hiller Aviation Museum

General information
- Type: Research UAV
- National origin: United States
- Manufacturer: Boeing
- Number built: 2

History
- First flight: 9 October 1988

The Boeing Condor is a high-tech test-bed piston-engined aerial reconnaissance unmanned aerial vehicle with a wingspan of over 200 feet (61 m).

Carbon-fibre composite materials make up the bulk of the Condor's fuselage and wings. Although the Condor has a relatively low radar cross-section and infrared signature, it is not unobservable, making it too vulnerable for military use.

The Condor is completely robotic, with an onboard computer to communicate with the computers on the ground via satellite to control all facets of the Condor's missions. The Condor's frame is made of mainly carbon-fiber-reinforced polymer composite, with very low radar and heat signatures.

The Condor had a 141-hour flight test program and first flew on 9 October 1988, with two built.

In 1989, the Condor set the world piston-powered aircraft altitude record of 67,028 ft (20,430 m) and was the first aircraft to fly a fully automated flight from takeoff to landing. It also set an unofficial endurance world record in 1988 by flying continuously for more than 50 hours, though the flight was not ratified by the Fédération Aéronautique Internationale (FAI) and is therefore not considered an official record.

During its evaluations, the Condor logged over 300 flight hours, flying over Moses Lake, Washington.

== Aircraft on display ==
The first flight article is now on display in the Hiller Aviation Museum in San Carlos, California and the second is disassembled at the National Museum of the United States Air Force's restoration center in Dayton, Ohio.

== Specifications ==
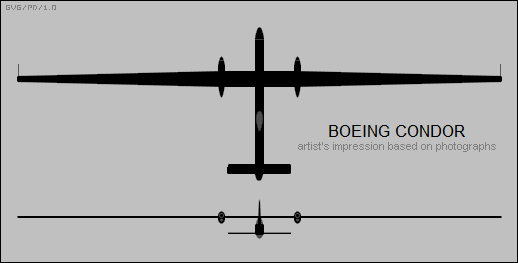
Three-view

Data from

General characteristics

- Capacity: 2,500 lb (1,100 kg)
- Length: 66 ft (20 m)
- Wingspan: 205 ft (62 m)
- Gross weight: 21,000 lb (9,525 kg)
- Max takeoff weight: 21,000 lb (9,525 kg)
- Fuel capacity: 12,000 lb (5,400 kg)
- Powerplant: 2 × Continental TSOL-300-2 turbo-charged 6-cyl liquid-cooled horizontally-opposed piston engines, 175 hp (130 kW) each props driven thru a 2 speed gear box changed gears at 42,000 ft (13,000 m)
- Propellers: 16-foot-diameter (4.9 m) 3-bladed composite propellers

Performance

- Maximum speed: 140 kn (160 mph, 260 km/h)
- Endurance: 161 hours +
- Service ceiling: 70,000 ft (20,500 m)
- Rate of climb: 2,010 ft/min (10.2 m/s)
- Lift-to-drag: 40:1 in cruising flight
