= Aurora Flight Sciences Orion =

Unmanned aerial vehicle developed by Aurora Flight Sciences

Orion

General information
- Type: ISR UCAV
- National origin: United States
- Manufacturer: Aurora Flight Sciences
- Status: In storage
- Number built: 1

History
- First flight: 24 August 2013

The Orion is a medium-altitude long-endurance unmanned aerial vehicle (UAV) developed by Aurora Flight Sciences, a subsidiary of the U.S. corporation Boeing. Only one was ever built and the U.S. Air Force decided against buying it.

== Development ==
Work on the Orion began in 2006, when the U.S. Army funded it as a hydrogen-fuelled "high-altitude, long-loiter" (HALL) UAV. Originally, it was conceived as a single-engine, hydrogen-fueled, high-altitude unmanned aircraft intended to carry a 400 lb (180 kg) payload to 65,000 ft (20,000 m) having a 7,000 lb (3,200 kg) gross weight; similar aircraft included the AeroVironment Global Observer and Boeing Phantom Eye.

Aurora Flight Sciences was selected by the Air Force Research Laboratory (AFRL) in 2007 for the Ultra Long Endurance study contract to look at fixed-wing alternatives to the Blue Devil 2 and Long Endurance Multi-Intelligence Vehicle (LEMV) surveillance airships then being explored (both ultimately cancelled) and push beyond the endurance limits of the MQ-1 Predator and RQ-4 Global Hawk; they submitted an unsolicited proposal to the AFRL for the Orion, powered by conventional engines, in 2008.

The company won a joint-capability technology demonstration contract to build the Orion in 2009, which led to a contract for the Medium-Altitude Global Intelligence, surveillance, reconnaissance and Communications relay (Magic) joint concept technology demonstration (JCTD) in 2010. By then, the Orion had been redesigned to be a twin-engine, turbo-diesel-powered, medium-altitude UAV capable of flying for 120 hours at 20,000 ft (6,100 m) with a 1,000 lb (450 kg) payload and an increased gross weight of 11,000 lb (5,000 kg). The first demonstrator was rolled out on 22 November 2010, 88 days after the contract award. In 2011, the program was transferred to the Air Force's Big Safari office.

=== Flight testing ===
The first flight was expected by August 2011, but progress was limited by funding. Orion's first flight occurred on 24 August 2013, flying for 3.5 hours at 8,000 ft (2,400 m) at an airspeed of 60 knots (110 km/h). From 5–8 December 2014, the Orion performed an 80-hour flight at Naval Air Weapons Station China Lake witnessed by the National Aeronautic Association, breaking the 30.4-hour endurance record set by the Global Hawk in 2001; the aircraft flew between 4,500–10,000 ft (1,400–3,000 m) with 1,000 lb (450 kg) of ballast to simulate payload.

Upon landing, it had 1,700 lb (770 kg) of fuel remaining, enough to fly for an additional 37 hours, but endurance was limited by the window of availability of the range for testing; four pilots rotated over the course of the flight. The December flight was the 18th for the Orion, logging 158 total flight hours. Aurora hoped the flight would convince the Air Force to procure the Orion for persistent surveillance, and the company looked at several other roles including a communications relay and to compete against the MQ-4C Triton naval recon UAV.

After five years of development and completing its flight demonstration program, by September 2015 the aircraft was relegated to a company hangar with the Air Force deciding not to buy it. Several reasons were given to explain this, including budget problems, a 40 m (132 ft) wingspan that cannot fit in many existing Air Force hangars, less speed, payload, and weapons capacity compared to the MQ-9 Reaper, and primarily the lack of an operational requirement for a multi-day, long-endurance unmanned aircraft. Aurora is looking internationally to try to bring the Orion into service for missions like long-range surveillance and maritime patrol.

The company is trying to raise money from private equity sources to build a system of three Orions to be leased to customers. Even though interest might not be in buying them, flight time could be made available for rent to users and combatant commanders on a fee-for-service basis with services provided; this has been done by the U.S. Special Operations Command (SOCOM), buying intelligence, surveillance and reconnaissance (ISR) services from Insitu for much smaller ScanEagle drones flown by contractors. By September 2016, the Orion was being taken out of storage to fly again.

A plan was approved by the company to build one three-vehicle system and offer the capability to the military as a contractor-owned or operated ISR service. The new Block 1 design features a few exterior changes, such as a slightly smaller tailplane surface, as well as changes to other structures and systems to offer by late 2019. A series of demonstrations are planned with the U.S. Coast Guard to experiment with surveillance missions over maritime borders.

== Design ==
The revolutionary aspect of the aircraft is meant to be its time on station cost, planned to be only 20 percent the cost per hour compared to current aerial surveillance aircraft like the Predator, MQ-9 Reaper, and MC-12W Liberty through efficient aerodynamics and propulsion, lightweight airframe, reliable systems, autonomous operation, and requiring fewer takeoffs and landings. Its ferry range is projected to be 13,000 nmi (24,000 km), longer than even the Global Hawk, which enables a time-on-station capability ranging from 113 hours at 550 nmi (1,020 km) to 47 hours at 3,000 nmi (5,600 km). With a mission range possible to over 9,500 nmi (17,600 km), the Orion can be positioned much further from the patrol area, reducing costs that would otherwise be needed to transport an aircraft to a closer main operating base; unit price is expected to be less than the Reaper.

The aircraft has an empty weight of 5,170 lb (2,350 kg) and carries 5,000 lb (2,300 kg) of fuel. It has the capacity to carry 2,500 lb (1,100 kg) of sensors and weapons spread through the airframe, able to support 950 lb (430 kg) in the nose, 850 lb (390 kg) in the aft fuselage, and 1,200 lb (540 kg) under the wings. The base sensor is the Raytheon MTS-B electro-optical/infrared turret, but options can include a ground moving target indication (GMTI) radar under the nose, a multi-camera wide-area surveillance sensor in the aft bay, and external fuel tanks and Hellfire missiles under the wings.

Its wingspan is only slightly longer than the Global Hawk's, made of a long-span, one-piece, low-drag, light weight composite wing from tip-to-tip, which reduces weight and cost but prevents it from being disassembled and airlifted to another location. Top speed is slow at 90 knots (170 km/h) by design to balance fuel efficiency and power consumption with weather tolerance. Propulsion comes from a pair of Austro Engine AE300 diesel engines rather than more expensive and less fuel efficient gas turbines. Although it is designed to fly for five days carrying standard payload weight, it could fly for a week with a lighter payload.

== Specifications ==
Data from Aurora Flight Sciences

General characteristics

- Crew: 0
- Capacity: 2,600 lb (1,200 kg) payload
- Length: 50 ft (15 m)
- Wingspan: 132 ft (40 m)
- Empty weight: 5,170 lb (2,345 kg)
- Gross weight: 11,200 lb (5,080 kg)
- Fuel capacity: 5,000 lb (2,300 kg)
- Powerplant: 2 × Austro Engine AE300 diesel piston engines, 170 hp (130 kW) each
- Propellers: 3-bladed

Performance

- Maximum speed: 120 kn (140 mph, 220 km/h)
- Cruise speed: 67–85 kn (77–98 mph, 124–157 km/h)
- Combat range: 3,500 nmi (4,000 mi, 6,400 km) mission radius, with 24 hours on station
- Ferry range: 13,000 nmi (15,000 mi, 24,000 km)
- Endurance: 120 hours with 1,000 lb (450 kg) payload
- Service ceiling: 30,000 ft (9,100 m)

== See also ==
- AeroVironment Global Observer
- Boeing Phantom Eye
- MQ-9 Reaper
- RQ-4 Global Hawk
- Orion (Russian UCAV)
