= BAE Systems PHASA-35 =

British unmanned aerial vehicle

PHASA-35
- Concept image of the aircraft in flight.

General information
- Type: High-Altitude Long Endurance unmanned aerial vehicle
- National origin: United Kingdom
- Manufacturer: BAE Systems / Prismatic

History
- Manufactured: 2018–present
- First flight: 17 February 2020

The BAE Systems Persistent High Altitude Solar Aircraft (PHASA-35) is a High-Altitude Long Endurance (HALE) unmanned aerial vehicle (UAV) developed by BAE Systems in collaboration with Prismatic. Designed as a cheaper alternative to satellites, the aircraft can be used for surveillance, border control, communications and disaster relief with a potential ability to stay airborne for up to 12 months. Developed in less than two years, the aircraft carried out its first flight in February 2020 and further trials are currently ongoing.

== Development ==
PHASA-35 was originally designed and developed by engineers who had previously worked on the Zephyr HAPS drone for Qinetiq. When Qinetiq sold Zephyr to Airbus Defence and Space in 2013, these engineers left and formed their own company, named Prismatic, to develop a rival aircraft. Development of PHASA-35 consequently began in 2018, in collaboration with BAE Systems, and a first flight was scheduled for 2019. Prior to this, a quarter-scale model, named the PHASE-8, completed a successful first flight in 2017. In September 2019, BAE Systems acquired Prismatic as a subsidiary. After less than two years in development, the PHASA-35 made its maiden flight on 17 February 2020 at the Woomera Test Range in Australia with support from the UK's Defence Science and Technology Laboratory and Australian Defence Science and Technology Group. Further trials commenced and, in October 2020, the aircraft carried out an endurance trial whilst carrying a sensor payload. The trials saw the aircraft operating 72 hours whilst in a simulated environment of harsh stratospheric conditions.

In January 2021, BAE Systems announced plans to carry out a flight demonstration in the United States after acknowledging “strong growing interest” in the aircraft from across the U.S. Department of Defense and federal agency customer base. By December 2024, it had flown for 24h and reached more than 66,000 ft (20,000 m) from Spaceport America in New Mexico, targeting operational activity by 2026.

== Design ==
The aircraft is a solar-electric HALE UAV designed as a cheaper alternative to satellites and is able to carry out a range of tasks, including border protection, maritime and military surveillance, disaster relief and communications. It is powered by the sun during the day, before switching to battery power during the night and can potentially stay airborne for 12 months. Featuring long-life battery technology, ultra-lightweight solar cells, a 35-metre (115 ft) wingspan and a weight of 150 kilograms (330 lb), the aircraft is designed to operate in the stratosphere. It has a payload capacity of 15kg.

== See also ==
- Solar-powered aircraft
