= General Atomics Altus =

Altus
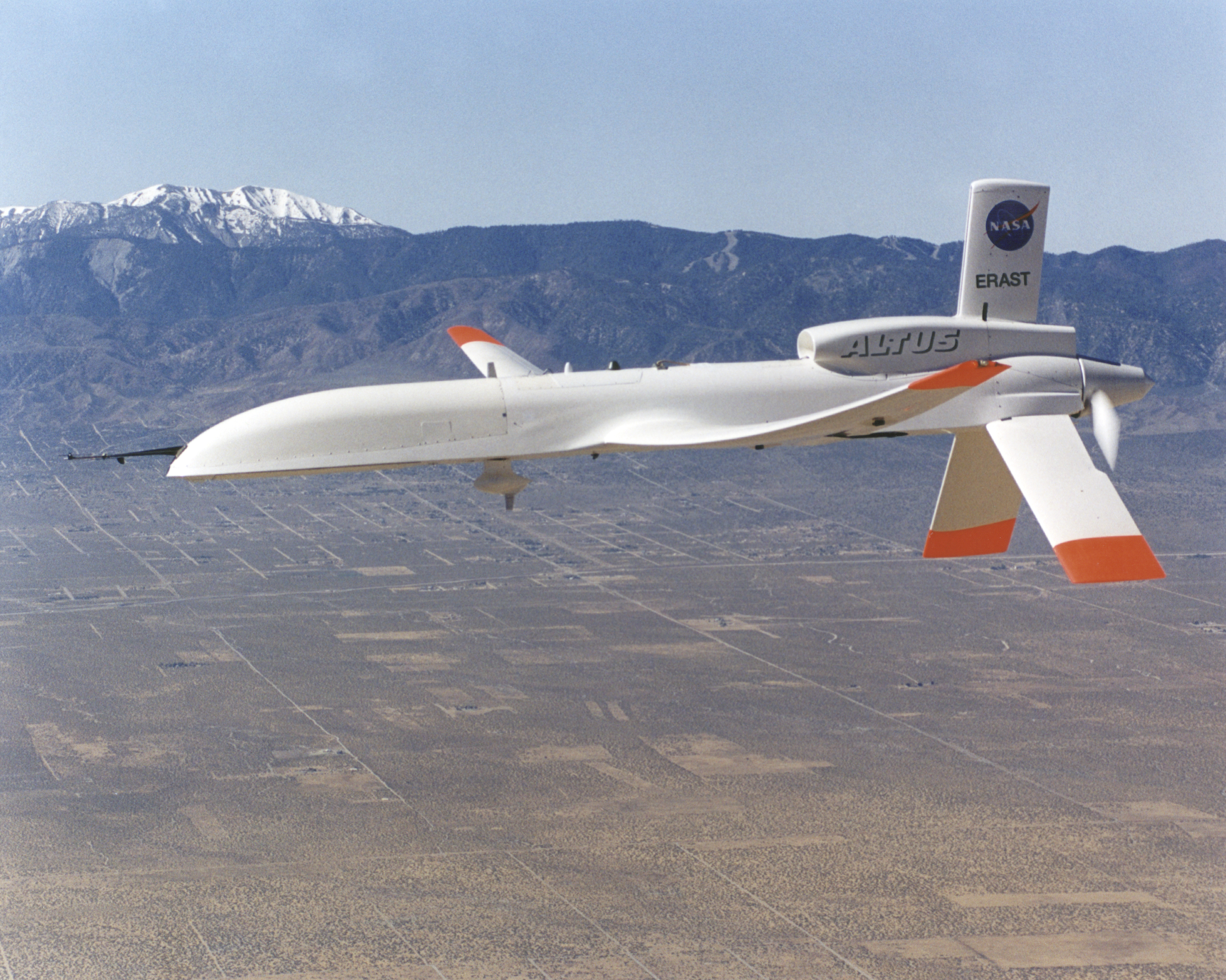

General information
- Type: Research UAV
- National origin: United States
- Manufacturer: General Atomics
- Primary user: NASA
- Number built: 2

History
- First flight: 1997
- Developed from: General Atomics Gnat

The General Atomics Altus is an unmanned aerial vehicle, designed for scientific research, built by General Atomics Aeronautical Systems (GA-ASI).

== Development ==
The Altus (the name is Latin for "high") is a civil variant of the GNAT-750 and MQ-1 Predator. Although similar in appearance, the Altus has a slightly longer wingspan and is designed to carry atmospheric sampling and other instruments for civilian scientific research missions in place of the military reconnaissance equipment carried by the Predators. It can carry up to 330 lb of sensors and other scientific instruments in a nose-mounted payload compartment, a location designed to allow air being sampled by the sensors to be undisturbed by heat or pollutants from engine exhaust. Power is provided by a four-cylinder Rotax 912 gasoline engine with additional airflow provided by a turbocharger built by Thermo-Mechanical Systems., Inc., of Canoga Park, CA.

GA-ASI has built two Altus aircraft to date: the Altus I, equipped with a single-stage turbocharger, for the Naval Postgraduate School, and the Altus II, with a two-stage turbocharger, for NASA under the ERAST Project.

== Altus I ==
The Altus I, completed in early 1997, flew a series of development flights at Dryden Flight Research Center in August 1997. Those test flights were designed to demonstrate the ability of the experimental craft to cruise at altitudes above 40,000 feet for sustained durations. On its final flight August 15, the Altus I reached an altitude of 43,500 feet, a record for a remotely operated aircraft powered by a piston engine augmented with a single-stage turbocharger.

== Altus II ==
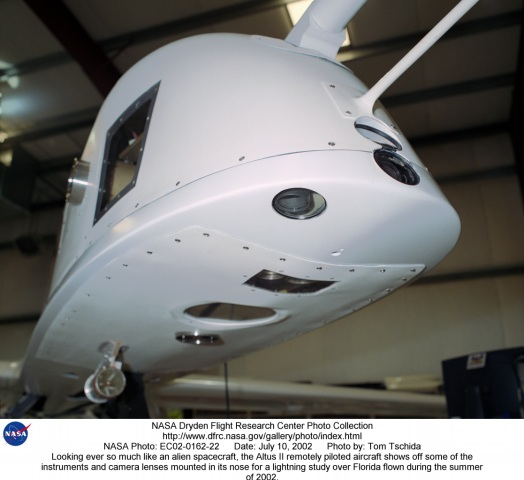

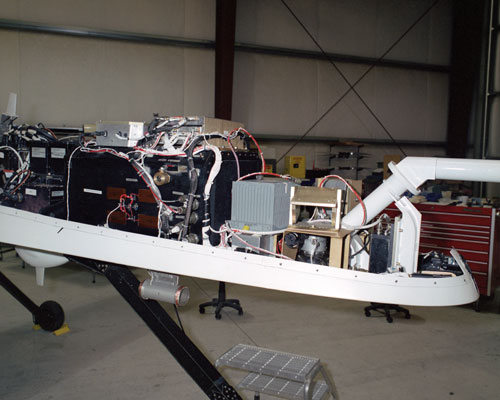

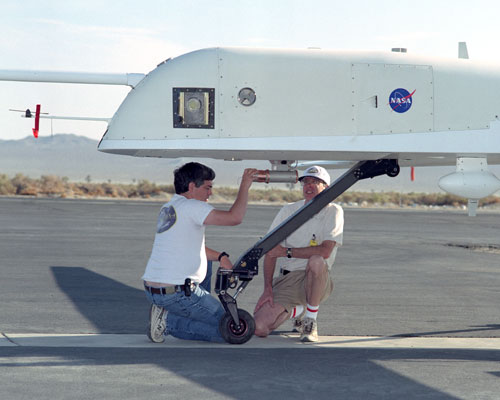

There were two primary goals for the Altus II development: to be a testbed for performance and propulsion concepts leading to the development of future remotely piloted or autonomous aircraft designed for high-altitude science missions and to evaluate its practicality for use as an airborne platform for such missions. The Altus II vehicle was used to verify technologies that will lead to a long-duration (12 to 72 hours), high-altitude vehicle capable of carrying a 330-pound science payload. The efforts include work on engine integration, flight operations techniques and procedures, lightweight structures, science payload integration, and science mission demonstration.

The Altus II, the first of the two craft to be completed, made its first flight on May 1, 1996. With its engine at first augmented by a single-stage turbocharger, the Altus II reached an altitude of 37,000 ft during its first series of development flights at Dryden in August 1996. In October of that year, the Altus II was flown in an Atmospheric Radiation Measurement (ARM-UAV) study in Oklahoma conducted by Sandia National Laboratories for the Department of Energy. During the course of those flights, the Altus II set a single-flight endurance record for remotely operated aircraft of more than 26 hours. In October 1996, Altus II set an endurance record for UAVs carrying science payloads. The vehicle spent more than 24 hours at the required altitude during an ARM-UAV.

After major modifications and upgrades, including installation of a two-stage turbocharger in place of its original single-stage unit, a larger fuel tank, and additional intercooling capacity, the Altus II returned to flight status in the summer of 1998. The goal of its development test flights was to reach one of the major Level 2 performance milestones within NASA's ERAST program: to fly a gasoline-fueled, piston-engine, remotely piloted aircraft for several hours at an altitude at or near 60,000 feet. On March 5, 1999, the Altus II maintained flight at or above 55,000 feet for three hours, reaching a maximum density altitude of 57,300 feet during the mission.

Later that spring, the Altus II flew another series of ARM-UAV missions. Hard-to-measure properties of high-level cirrus clouds that may affect global warming were recorded using specially designed instruments while the Altus flew at 50,000 feet altitude off the Hawaiian island of Kauaʻi. Clouds both reflect incoming solar energy back to space and absorb warm longwave radiation from the Earth's surface, keeping that heat in the atmosphere. Data from the study will help scientists better understand how these dual roles of clouds in reflecting and absorbing solar energy work and build more accurate global climate models.

In September 2001, Altus II served as the UAV platform for a flight demonstration of remote sensing and imaging capabilities that could detect hot spots in wildfires and relay that data in near-real time via the Internet to firefighting commanders below. The demonstration, led by NASA Ames Research Center, was flown over GA-ASI's El Mirage, California, development facility in Southern California.

In the summer of 2002, the Altus II served as the airborne platform for the Altus Cumulus Electrification Study (ACES), led by Dr. Richard J. Blakeslee of NASA Marshall Space Flight Center. The ACES experiment focused on the collection of electrical, magnetic, and optical measurements of thunderstorms. Data collected will help scientists understand the development and life cycles of thunderstorms, which in turn may allow meteorologists to more accurately predict when destructive storms may hit.

== Project milestones ==
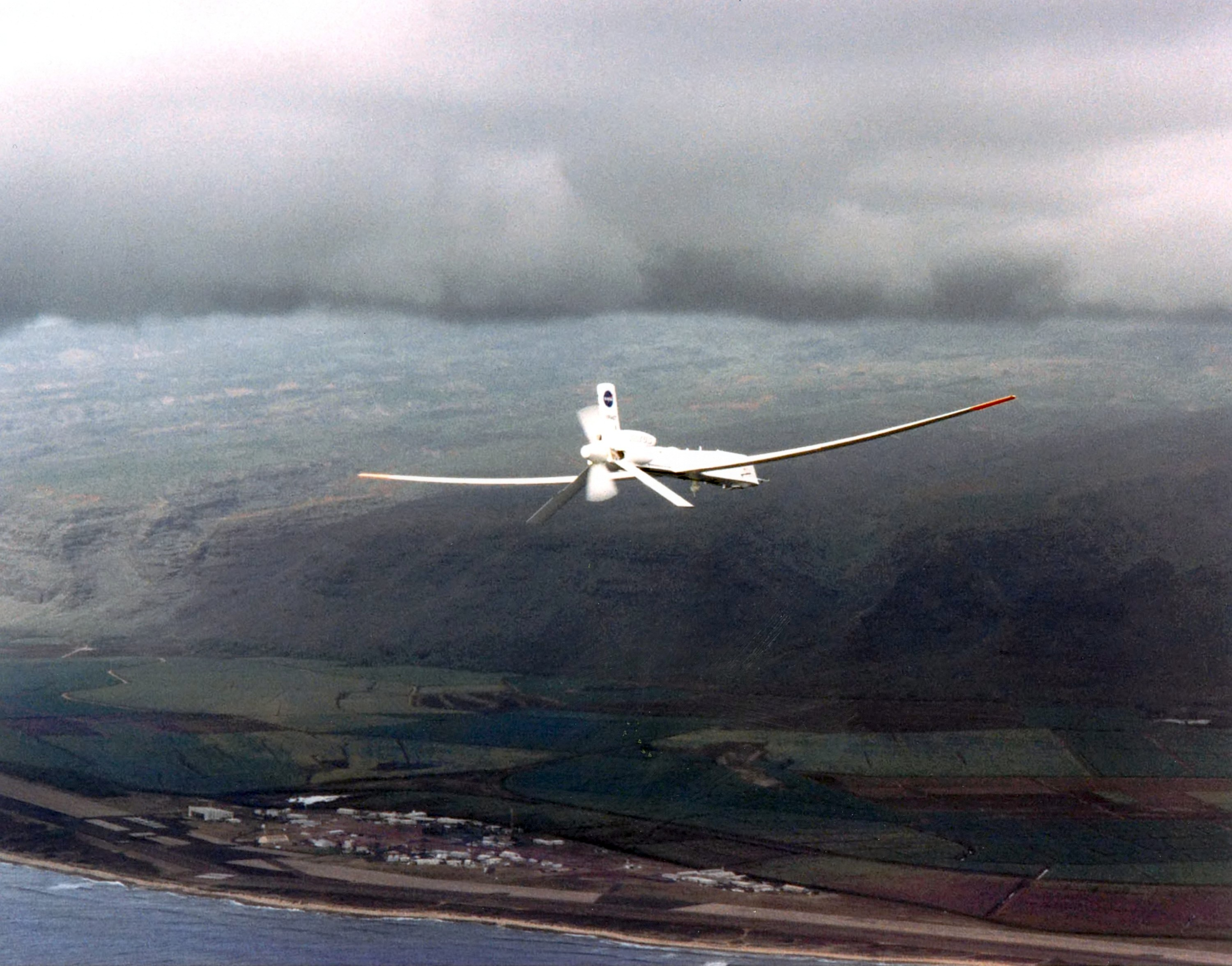
Altus II over Kauai, Hawaii

- September 5, 1996 Altus reached a personal best by attaining 37,000 feet for more than 2 hours.
- October 1996: Altus set endurance record for UAVs carrying science payloads on a 26-hour flight.
- Summer 1997: Altus reached 43,500 feet during development flights.
- Spring 1998: Altus returns to flight test
- March 1999: Altus flew for 3 hours above 55,000 feet and 8 hours at 50,000 feet altitude.
- July 23, 1999: Altus flew to 55,000 feet over 4 hours.

== Specifications (Altus II) ==
General characteristics

- Capacity: Up to 330 lb (150 kg) in the nose compartment
- Length: 23 ft 7 in (7.2 m)
- Wingspan: 54 ft 2 in (16.5 m)
- Wing area: 131 sq ft (12.2 m^{2})
- Aspect ratio: 24:1
- Gross weight: 2,130 lb (966 kg)
- Fuel capacity: 92 US gal (348 L)
- Powerplant: 1 × Rotax 912 4-cyl. liquid-cooled horizontally opposed piston engine with a two-stage turbocharger, 100 hp (75 kW)
- Propellers: 2-bladed pusher propeller

Performance

- Maximum speed: 100 kn (120 mph, 190 km/h)
- Cruise speed: 70 kn (81 mph, 130 km/h)
- Range: 400 nmi (460 mi, 740 km)
- Endurance: Approx. 24 hrs, depending on altitude
- Service ceiling: 65,000 ft (20,000 m)
- Wing loading: 16.3 lb/sq ft (80 kg/m^{2})

== See also ==
- MQ-1 Predator
- GNAT-750
- ERAST Project
