= NASA ERAST Program =

NASA long endurance UAV development program

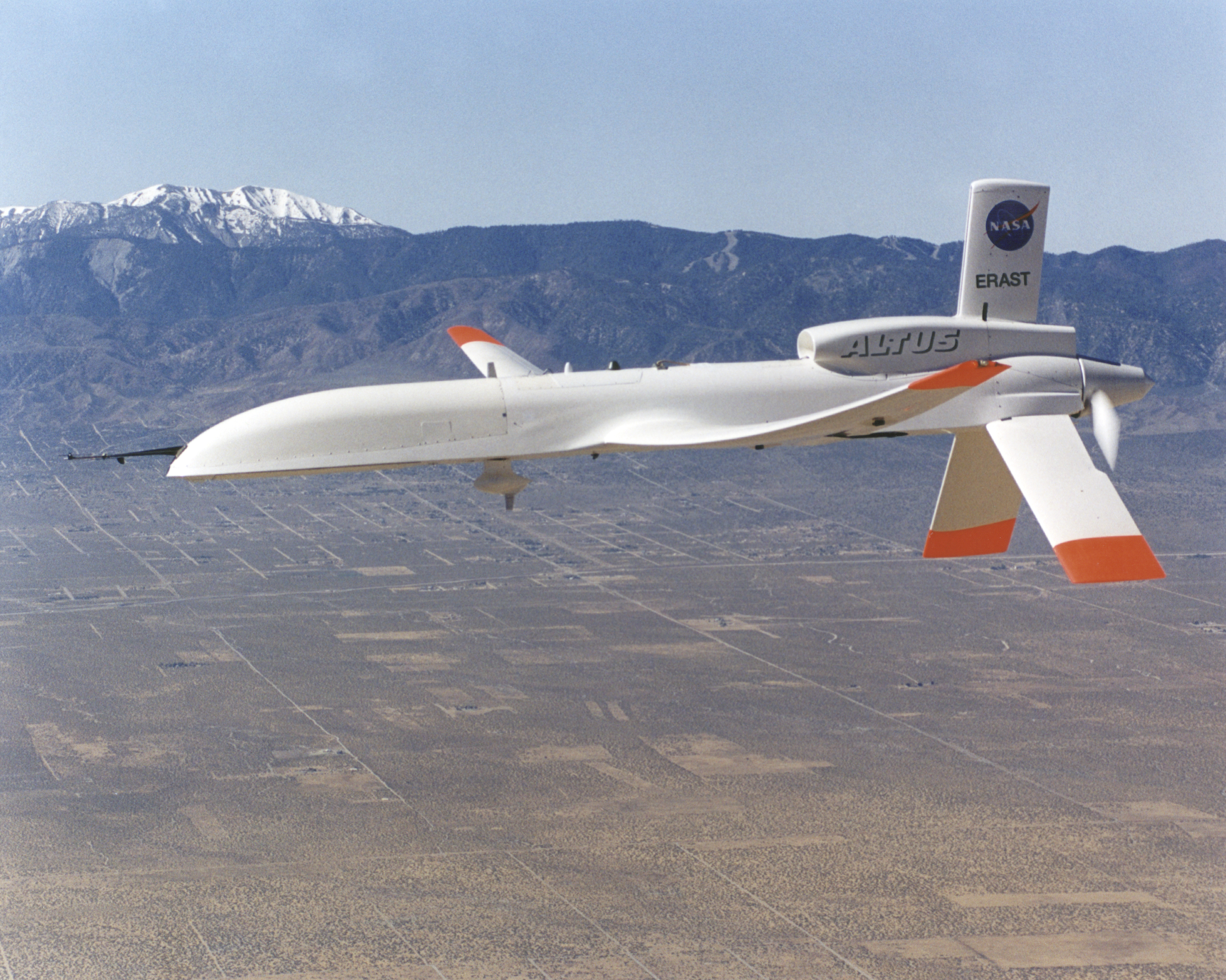
NASA's Altus II UAV developed under ERAST

The Environmental Research Aircraft and Sensor Technology, or ERAST program was a NASA program to develop cost-effective, slow-flying unmanned aerial vehicles (UAVs) that could perform long-duration science missions at altitudes above 60,000 ft (18,000 m). The project included a number of technology development programs conducted by a public/private partnership between NASA and industry called the ERAST Alliance. The ERAST Program was formally terminated in 2003.

== Program overview ==
According to NASA, "ERAST was a multiyear effort to develop the aeronautical and sensor technologies for a new family of remotely piloted aircraft intended for upper atmospheric science missions. Designed to cruise at slow speeds for long durations at altitudes of 60,000 to 100,000 ft (18,000 to 30,000 m), such aircraft could be used to collect, identify, and monitor environmental data to assess global climate change and assist in weather monitoring and forecasting. They also could serve as airborne telecommunications platforms, performing functions similar to communications satellites at a fraction of the cost of lofting a satellite into space."

The ERAST program was sponsored by the Office of Aeronautics and Space Transportation Technology at NASA Headquarters, and was managed by NASA Dryden Flight Research Center. The NASA Ames Research Center, Moffett Field, California, headed the sensor technology development. The NASA Lewis Research Center, Cleveland, Ohio, and NASA Langley Research Center, Hampton, Virginia, contributed expertise in the areas of propulsion, structures, and systems analysis. Several small high-technology aeronautical development firms, including ALTUS developer General Atomics Aeronautical Systems, Inc., were teamed with NASA in the ERAST Alliance to work towards common goals of the program."

== ERAST Alliance NASA Joint Sponsored Research Project ==
ERAST was organized as a public/private partnership of the NASA Joint Sponsored Research Program. The public sector members included NASA and the Department of Defense, while the Industry partners in the ERAST Alliance included Aurora Flight Sciences, AeroVironment, General Atomics, Scaled Composites, Thermo-Mechanical Systems, Hyperspectral Sciences, and Longitude 122 West.

The ERAST Alliance was one of three, large scale aeronautics industry public/private partnerships organized by NASA's Joint Sponsored Research program at the request of NASA Headquarters between 1992 and 1994. The public/private partnerships were based on the industry model for multi-party, R&D partnerships, initially proposed for NASA's Space Commercialization programs by SRI International to the NASA Space Commercialization Task Force based on a precedent established for the Semiconductor industry, Sematech. The ERAST Alliance used the innovative Joint Sponsored Research Agreement (JSRA), adopted by NASA officials to satisfy technology commercialization policy objectives and credited by the ERAST participants as a key enabler of the technical success of the program. The JSRA was based on NASA's funded Space Act Agreement Authority, which permitted flexible teaming, cost-sharing and intellectual property sharing to maximize collaboration for rapid technology development progress. The Federal contribution to ERAST was reported at $42.2 million while the private sector contribution was reported at $30,000 along with in-kind contributions of personnel, equipment and background intellectual property. The ERAST JSRA was one of three aeronautics public/private partnership agreements designed by American Technology Initiative (AmTech). AmTech served as the ERAST Alliance partnership manager, administrator and facilitator for the duration of the Alliance ending in 1995. ERAST program research continued until 2003.

== Missions ==
The ERAST Allance prepared for multiple science missions including remote sensing for Earth sciences studies, hyperspectral imaging for agriculture monitoring, tracking of severe storms, and serving as telecommunications relay platforms.

A parallel effort headed by Ames developed lightweight, microminiaturized sensors that can be carried by these aircraft for environmental research and Earth monitoring.

Additional technologies considered by the ERAST Alliance include lightweight materials, avionics, aerodynamics, and other forms of propulsion suitable for extreme altitudes and duration.

Although ERAST Alliance members were responsible for aircraft development and operation, NASA had primary responsibility for overall program leadership, major funding, individual project management, development and coordination of payloads. NASA also worked on long-term issues with the Federal Aviation Administration and developed technology to make operation of these remotely operated aircraft in national airspace practical.

== History ==
In 1987 and 1988, NASA conducted atmospheric ozone-layer depletion studies using two piloted NASA aircraft, a modified Douglas DC-8 jetliner and a Lockheed ER-2, a civilian version of the U-2 spy plane. However, operating the ER-2 over Antarctica, where ozone depletion took place, was regarded as risky, since if the pilot had to bail out, survival was unlikely. In addition, the ER-2 had a ceiling of 20 kilometers (65,000 feet), while ozone depletion takes place at 30 kilometers (100,000 feet), and the ER-2 could not stay aloft long enough to study ozone changes during a full day-night cycle.

In 1988, NASA decided to obtain a HALE UAV named "Perseus" to deal with these problems, designating the effort the Small High-Altitude Science Aircraft (SHASA) program. Perseus was designed by a startup company named Aurora Flight Sciences of Manassas, Virginia. The Perseus design effort struggled along on skimpy funds until 1991, when NASA was conducting a "High Speed Research Program" to evaluate designs for a future supersonic transport, and needed to learn more about the possible environmental impact of such an aircraft on the upper atmosphere. Funds became available to procure a few aircraft.

Other government agencies were also interested in HALE UAVs, and so the ERAST effort was born in September 1994 as a high-profile item in NASA'a agenda. ERAST was formally intended to promote the use of UAVs in commercial science applications, particularly high-altitude atmospheric research. ERAST also focused on development of new miniaturized sensor and avionics systems for the UAVs and for NASA's Lockheed ER-2.

== Project components and programs ==
=== Aircraft ===
==== Aurora Perseus and Theseus ====
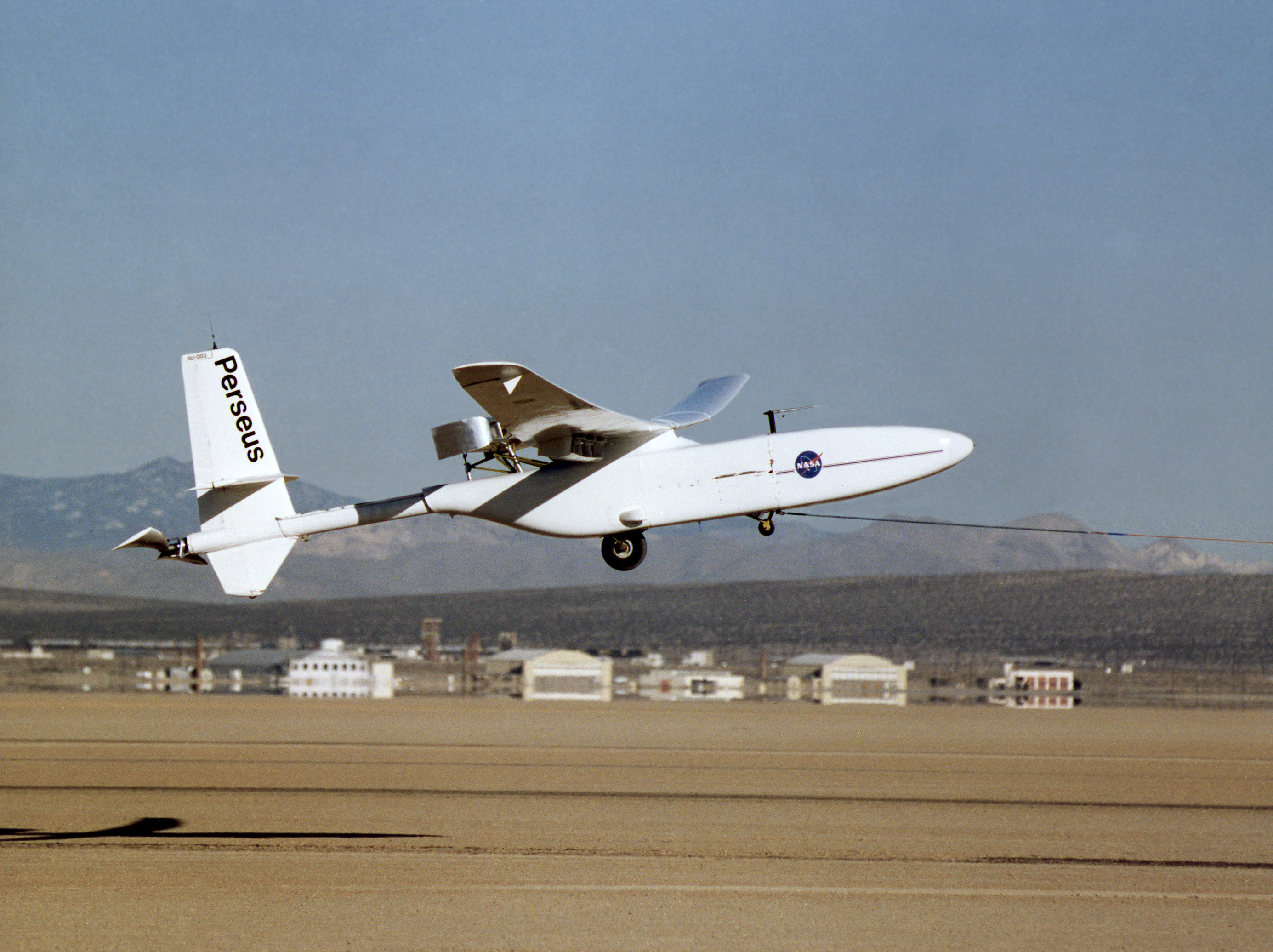
Perseus A being Towed in Flight

Built by Aurora Flight Sciences, the Perseus Proof-Of-Concept UAV first flew in November 1991 followed by Perseus A on 21 December 1993, which reached over 50,000 ft (15,000 m). Designed to fly at 62,000 ft (18.9 km) and up to 24 hours, Perseus B first flew on 7 October 1994 and reached 60,280 ft (18,370 m) on June 27, 1998. Its pusher propeller is powered by a Rotax 914 piston engine boosted by a three-stage turbocharger flat-rated to 105 hp (78 kW) to 60,000 ft (18,000 m). It has a 2,500 lb (1,100 kg) maximum weight, is able to carry a 260 lb (120 kg) payload and its 71.5 ft (21.8 m) wing has a high 26:1 aspect ratio. A larger follow-on powered by two Rotax 912 piston engines, the Theseus first flew on May 24, 1996. Designed to fly during 50 hours up to 65,000 ft (20,000 m), the 5,500 (2.5 t) maximum weight UAV was 140 ft (42.7 m) wide and could carry a 340 kg (750 lb) payload.

==== Pathfinder, Centurion, and Helios ====
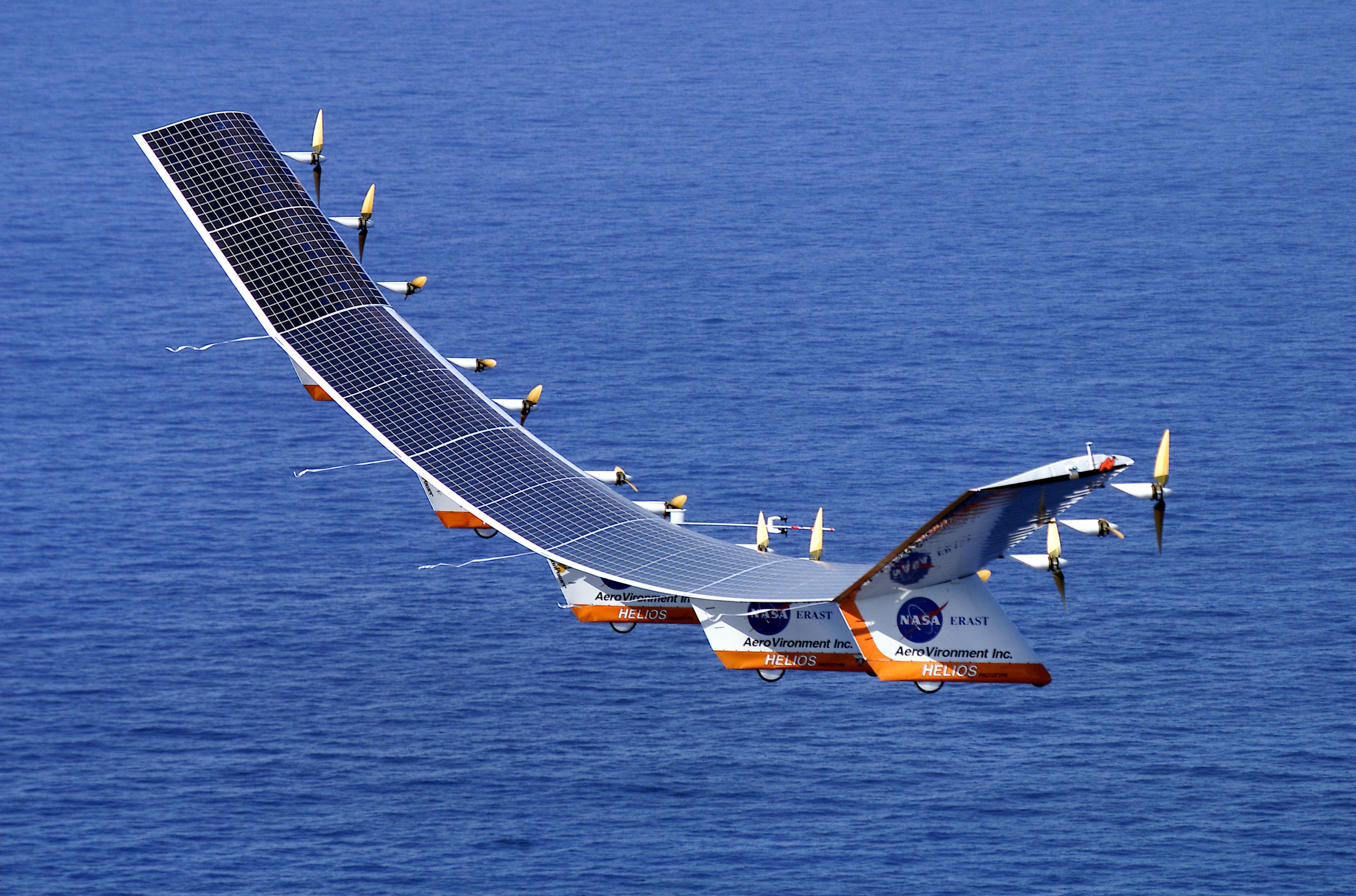
Helios UAV in flight

The NASA Pathfinder, Centurion, and Helios aircraft were a series of solar- and fuel cell system-powered UAVs, which AeroVironment, Inc. developed the vehicle under the ERAST program.

Pathfinder, which was designed and built by AeroVironment, is essentially a flying wing with a 99-foot (30 m) span. Solar photovoltaic cells mounted on the top of the wing produce up to 7,200 watts, powering the aircraft's six electric-driven propellers, as well as the suite of scientific instruments. Backup batteries store solar energy to power the aircraft at night.

==== ALTUS ====
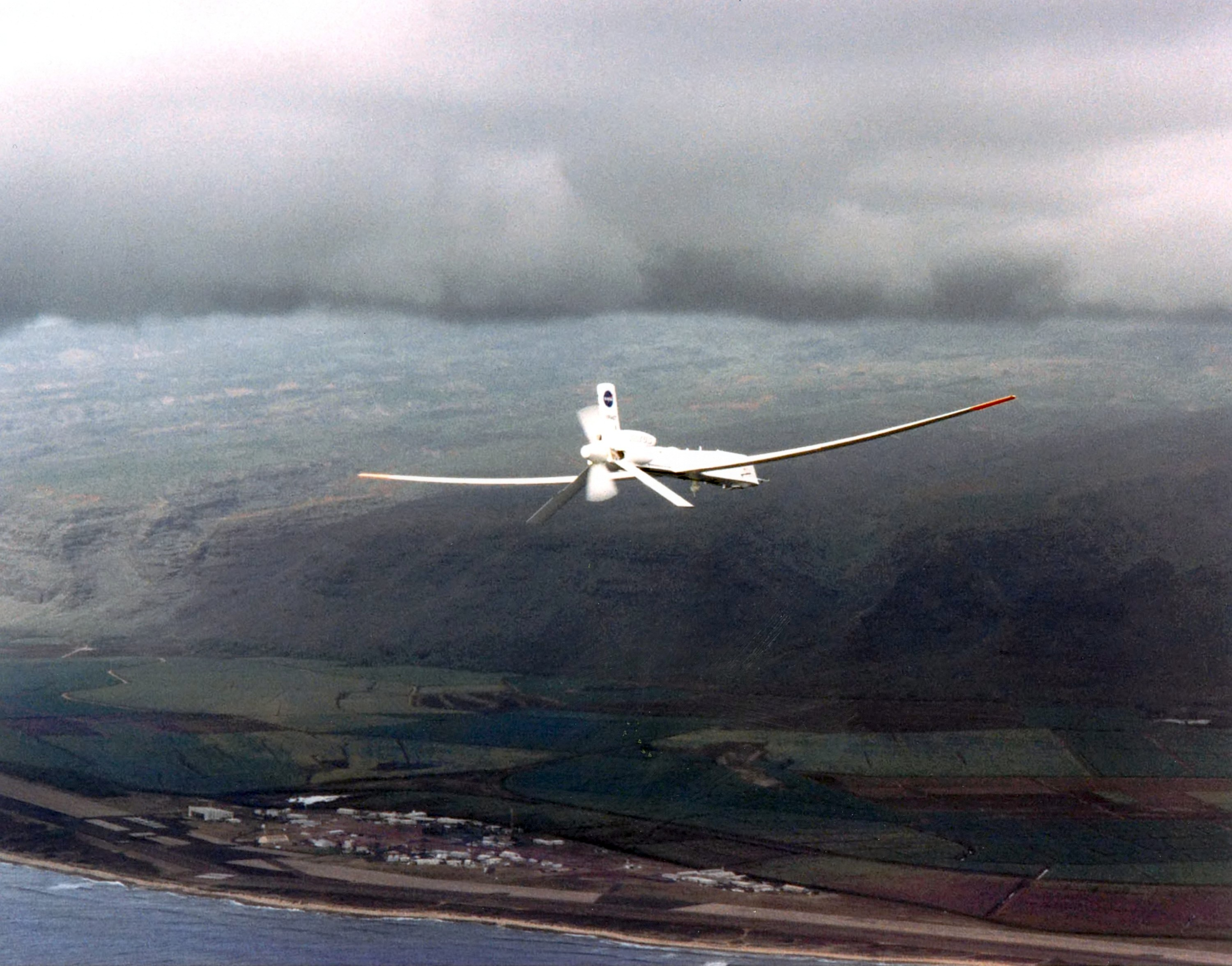
Altus II flying above Pacific Missile Range

The General Atomics ALTUS II is a civilian variant of the MQ-1 Predator UAV designed for scientific research missions. One of the two ALTUS aircraft, ALTUS II, was built under the ERAST program and has participated in a number of the related research missions.

The ALTUS II made its first flight on May 1, 1996. With its engine at first augmented by a single-stage turbocharger, the ALTUS II reached an altitude of 37,000 ft during its first series of development flights at Dryden in August, 1996. In October of that year, the ALTUS II was flown in an Atmospheric Radiation Measurement (ARM-UAV) study in Oklahoma conducted by Sandia National Laboratories for the Department of Energy. During the course of those flights, the ALTUS II set a single-flight endurance record for remotely operated aircraft of more than 26 hours. In October 1996, ALTUS II set an endurance record for UAVs carrying science payloads. The vehicle spent more than 24 hours at the required altitude during an ARM-UAV.

After major modifications and upgrades, including installation of a two-stage turbocharger in place of its original single-stage unit, a larger fuel tank and additional intercooling capacity, the ALTUS II returned to flight status in the summer of 1998. The goal of its development test flights was to reach one of the major ERAST Level 2 performance milestones, to fly a gasoline-fueled, piston-engine remotely piloted aircraft for several hours at an altitude at or near 60,000 feet. On March 5, 1999, The ALTUS II maintained flight at or above 55,000 feet for three hours, reaching a maximum density altitude of 57,300 feet during the mission.

=== Sensors and instruments ===
==== ARTIS camera ====
A small Airborne Real-Time Imaging System (ARTIS) camera, developed by HyperSpectral Sciences, Inc., under ERAST project, was flight demonstrated during the summer of 1999 on board the Scaled Composites Proteus aircraft when it took visual and near-infrared photos from Proteus while it was flying high over the Experimental Aircraft Association's AirVenture 99 Airshow at Oshkosh, Wisconsin. The images were displayed on a computer monitor at the show only moments after they were taken.

==== DASI ====
The Digital Array Scanned Interferometer (DASI) was operated from the Pathfinder in the summer of 1997, acquiring imaging interferometric data of the Hawaiian Islands. The DASI, which originated at Washington University in St. Louis and was jointly developed with Ames Research Center, had to meet the stringent engineering and operating requirements of the Pathfinder with respect to remote operation, very light weight, and low volume, power and bandwidth.

==== DSA ====
In March 2002, NASA Dryden, in cooperation with New Mexico State University's Technical Analysis and Applications Center (TAAC), the FAA and several other entities, conducted flight demonstrations of an active detect, see and avoid (DSA) system for potential application to UAVs at Las Cruces, New Mexico. The Scaled Composites Proteus aircraft was flown as a surrogate UAV controlled remotely from the ground, although safety pilots were aboard to handle takeoff and landing and any potential emergencies. Three other aircraft, ranging from general aviation aircraft to a NASA F/A-18, served as "cooperative" target aircraft with an operating transponder. In each of 18 different scenarios, a Goodrich Skywatch HP Traffic Advisory System (TAS) on the Proteus detected approaching air traffic on potential collision courses, including several scenarios with two aircraft approaching from different directions. The remote pilot then directed Proteus to turn, climb or descend as needed to avoid the potential threat.

In April 2003, a second series of flight demonstrations focusing on "non-cooperative" aircraft (those without operating transponders), was conducted in restricted airspace near Mojave, California., again using the Proteus as a surrogate UAV. Proteus was equipped with a small Amphitech OASys 35 GHz primary radar system to detect potential intruder aircraft on simulated collision courses. The radar data was telemetered directly to the ground station as well as via an Inmarsat satellite system installed on Proteus. A mix of seven intruder aircraft, ranging from a sailplane to a high-speed jet, flew 20 scenarios over a four-day period, one or two aircraft at a time. In each case, the radar picked up the intruding aircraft at ranges from 2.5 to 6.5 miles (4.0 to 10.5 km), depending on the intruder's radar signature. Proteus' remote pilot on the ground was able to direct Proteus to take evasive action if needed.

== See also ==
- NASA Mini-Sniffer
- Airborne Science Program
- NASA Earth Science Enterprise (formerly "Mission to Planet Earth")
- Atmospheric satellite
