= NASA Centurion =

Unmanned aerial vehicle developed by AeroVironment for NASA

Centurion
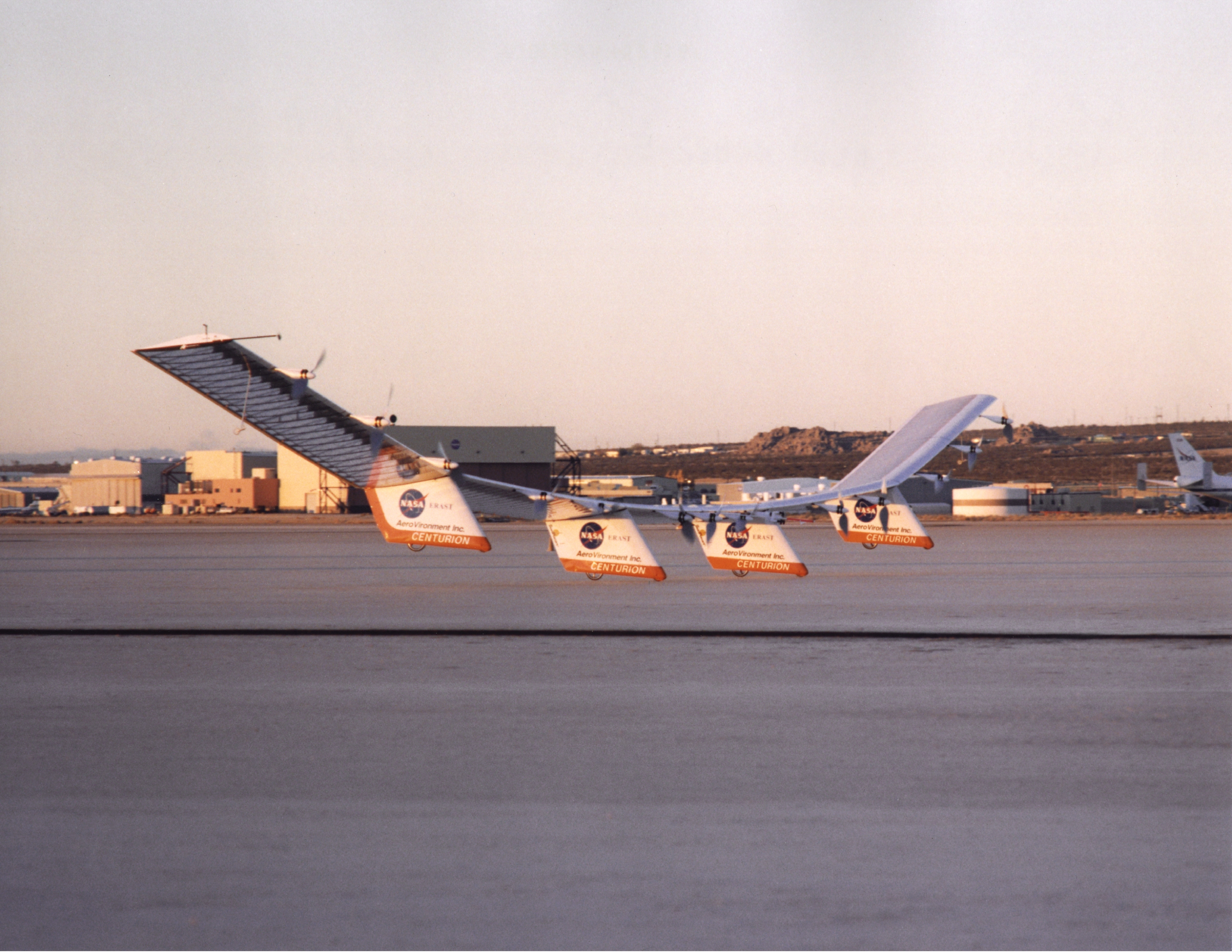
- Centurion takes off from Dryden in December, 1998

General information
- Type: Remote controlled UAV
- Manufacturer: AeroVironment
- Primary user: NASA ERAST Program
- Number built: 1

History
- First flight: November 10, 1998
- Developed from: NASA Pathfinder
- Developed into: NASA Helios

The NASA Centurion was the third aircraft developed as part of an evolutionary series of solar- and fuel-cell-system-powered unmanned aerial vehicles. AeroVironment, Inc. developed the vehicles under NASA's Environmental Research Aircraft and Sensor Technology (ERAST) program. They were built to develop the technologies that would allow long-term, high-altitude aircraft to serve as atmospheric satellites, to perform atmospheric research tasks as well as serve as communications platforms. It was developed from the NASA Pathfinder Plus aircraft and was developed into the NASA Helios.

== Centurion ==
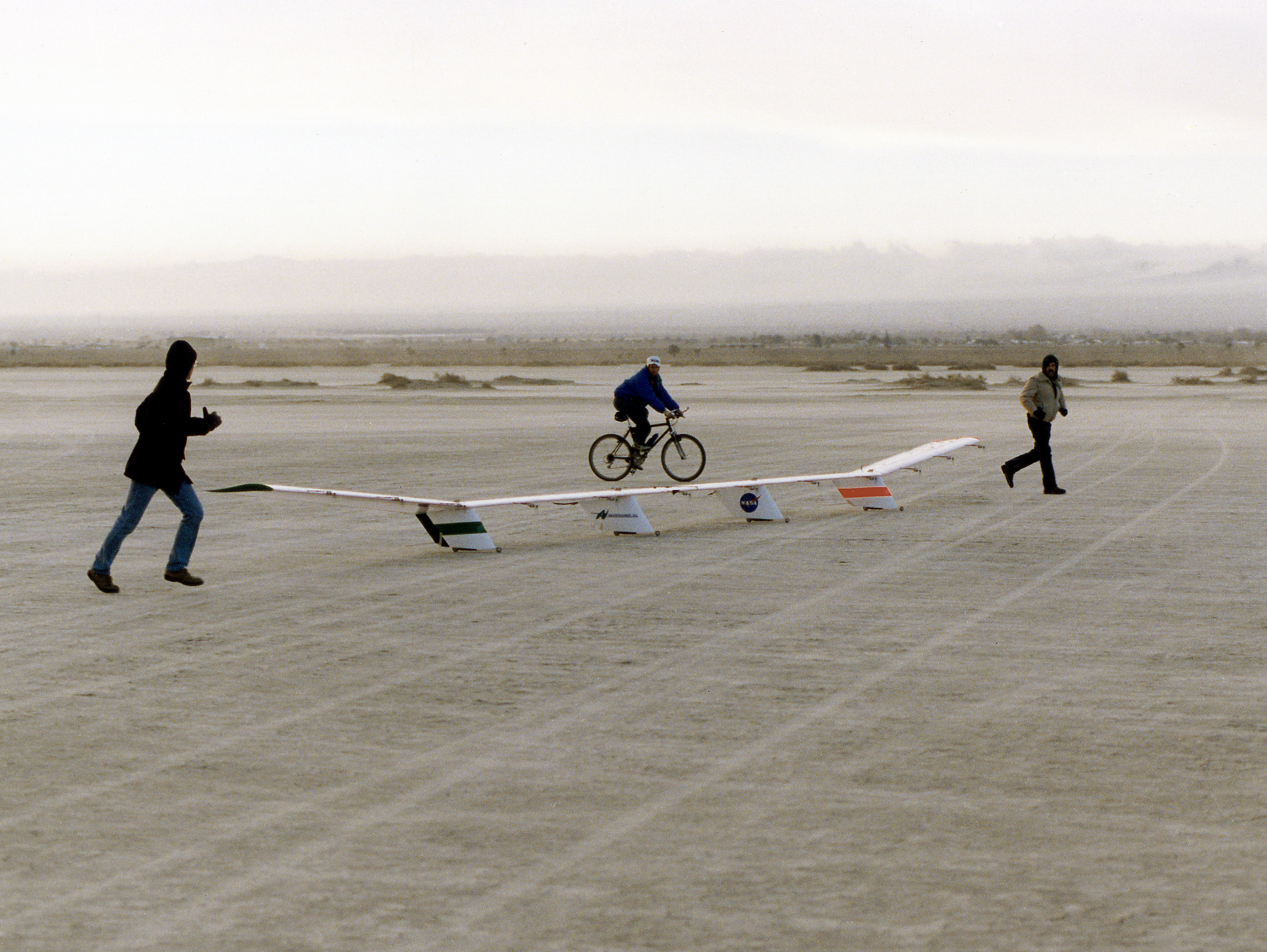
Quarter scale model of Centurion

Centurion, originally built for the 100,000 feet (30,000 m) altitude on solar power milestone specified by the ERAST project, was the third generation aircraft in the NASA Pathfinder series of electrical-powered flying wing unmanned aircraft. The ERAST program managers had determined that an aircraft based on the Pathfinder/Pathfinder Plus concept would be the lowest risk approach of achieving the altitude goal.

Initially, a quarter-scale model of the Centurion was test flown at El Mirage Dry Lake on March 4, 1997. The full-size Centurion's maiden flight took place at Rogers Dry Lake on November 10, 1998, and lasted a total of 1 hr and 24 minutes. At the time, it weighed in at 1,385 pounds (628.2 kg) (including a 150 pounds (68.0 kg) steel anvil hanging on its centerline to simulate a payload) for its first flight. The flight was nearly flawless and was followed by a second similar performance on November 19, this time before a crowd of VIPs and Media. It lasted 1 hr and 29 minutes. The third and final flight of the low altitude test series took place on December 3. On this flight the vehicle was loaded down to its maximum gross weight of 1,806 pounds (819.2 kg) to test its weight carrying capability. Total flight time on this flight was 30 minutes, as it was shortened because high winds were anticipated by mid-morning. All of these flights took place on battery power and verified the design's handling qualities, performance, and structural integrity. Following these three flights, NASA decided to expand the aircraft into the Helios Prototype, with work starting in January, 1999.

=== Aircraft description ===
The design of Centurion resulted in an aircraft that looked very much like the Pathfinder, but with a much longer wingspan of 206 feet (63 m). Although the Centurion shape resembled the Pathfinder, the structure was designed to be stronger and capable of carrying numerous payloads (up to 600 pounds (272.2 kg)) more efficiently. Its wing incorporated a redesigned high-altitude airfoil and the span was increased to 206 feet (63 m). The number of motors was increased to 14 and the number of underwing pods to carry batteries, flight control system components, ballast, and landing gear rose to four.

== Specifications ==
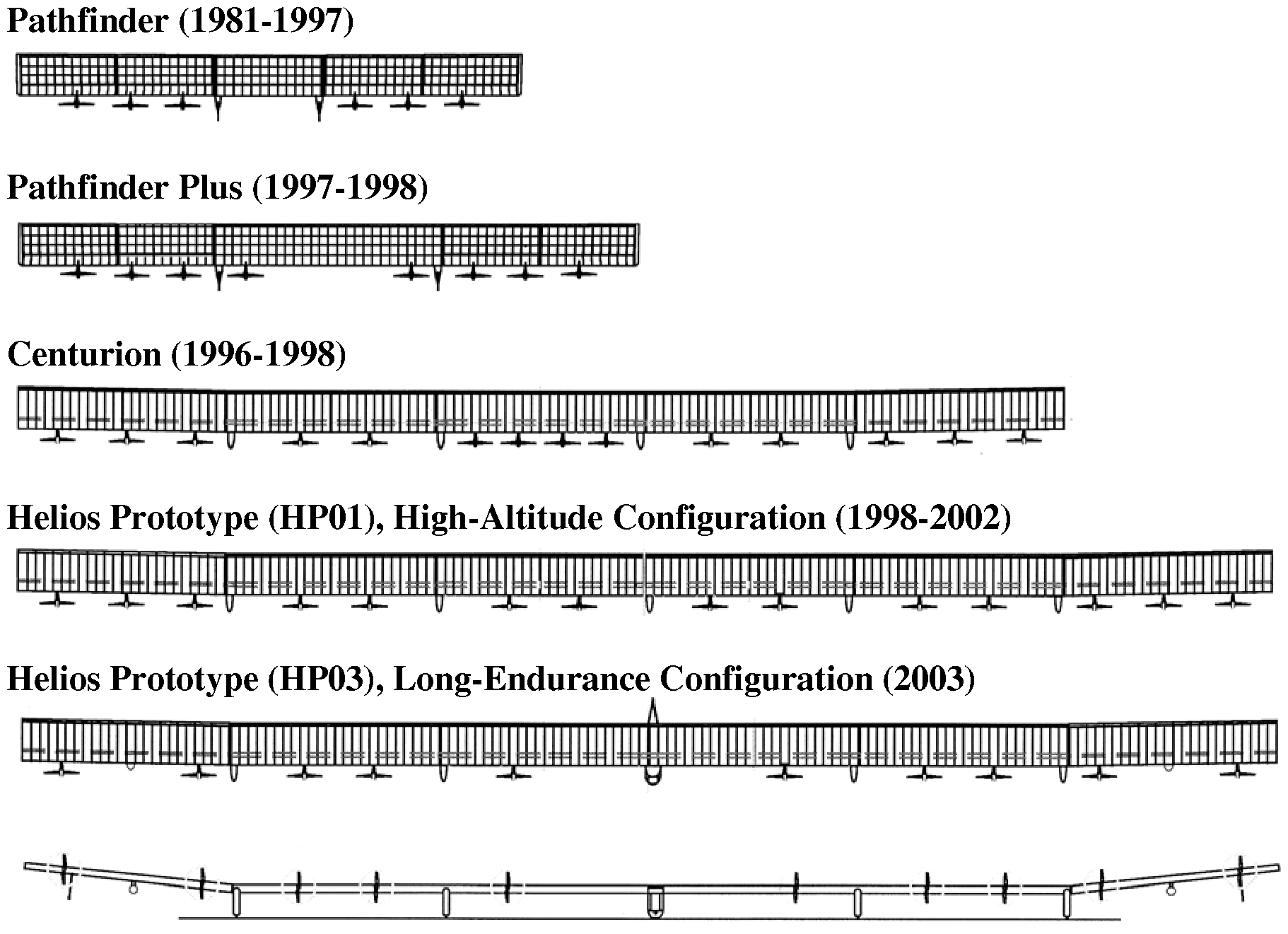
Solar Aircraft Evolution through the ERAST Program

Specifications
| | Pathfinder | Pathfinder-Plus | Centurion | Helios HP01 | Helios HP03 |
|---|---|---|---|---|---|
| Length ft(m) | 12 (3.6) | 12 (3.6) | 12 (3.6) | 12 (3.6) | 16.5 (5.0) |
| Chord ft(m) | 8 (2.4) | | | | |
| Wingspan ft(m) | 98.4 (29.5) | 121 (36.3) | 206 (61.8) | 247 (75.3) | |
| Aspect ratio | 12 to 1 | 15 to 1 | 26 to 1 | 30.9 to 1 | |
| Glide ratio | 18 to 1 | 21 to 1 | ? | ? | ? |
| Airspeed kts(km/h) | | | 15–18 (27–33) | 16.5–23.5 (30.6–43.5) | ? |
| Max altitude ft(m) | 71,530 (21,802) | 80,201 (24,445) | n/a | 96,863 (29,523) | 65,000 (19,812) |
| Empty Wt lb(kg) | ? | ? | ? | 1,322 (600) | ? |
| Max. weight lb(kg) | 560 (252) | 700 (315) | ±1,900 (±862) | 2,048 (929) | 2,320 (1,052) |
| Payload lb(kg) | 100 (45) | 150 (67,5) | 100–600 (45–270) | 726 (329) | ? |
| Engines | electric, 2 hp (1.5 kW) each | | | | |
| No. of engines | 6 | 8 | 14 | 14 | 10 |
| Solar pwr output (kW) | 7.5 | 12.5 | 31 | ? | 18.5 |
| Supplemental power | batteries | batteries | batteries | Li batteries | Li batteries, fuel cell |

== See also ==
- The prehistory of endurance UAVs
- Electric aircraft
- Regenerative fuel cell
- NASA Pathfinder (First flew in June 1983)
- NASA/AeroVironment Helios Prototype (First flight 8 September 1999)
- QinetiQ/Airbus Zephyr (First flight in 2008)
- Facebook Aquila (First flight 28 June 2016)
- SoftBank/AeroVironment HAPSMobile (First flight 11 September 2019)
- BAE Systems PHASA-35 (First flight 17 February 2020)
