= AeroVironment Helios Prototype =

Unmanned aerial vehicle

Helios Prototype
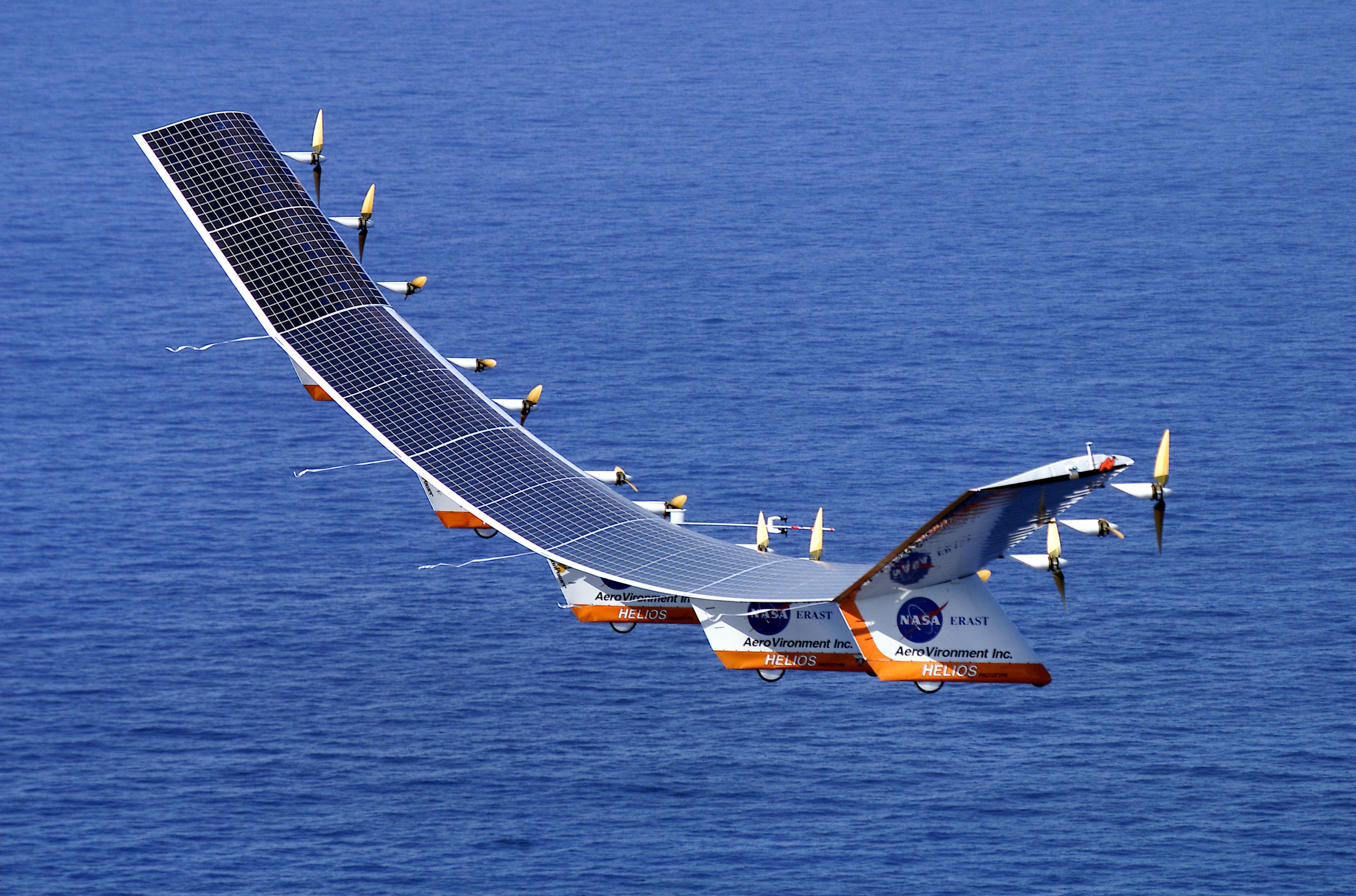
- Helios Prototype in flight

General information
- Type: Unmanned aerial vehicle
- Manufacturer: AeroVironment
- Status: Destroyed in 2003
- Primary user: NASA ERAST Program
- Number built: 1

History
- First flight: September 8, 1999
- Developed from: NASA Pathfinder, Pathfinder Plus and NASA Centurion

The Helios Prototype was the fourth and final aircraft developed as part of an evolutionary series of solar- and fuel-cell-system-powered unmanned aerial vehicles. AeroVironment, Inc. developed the vehicles under NASA's Environmental Research Aircraft and Sensor Technology (ERAST) program. They were built to develop the technologies that would allow long-term, high-altitude aircraft to serve as atmospheric satellites, to perform atmospheric research tasks as well as serve as communications platforms. It was developed from the NASA Pathfinder and NASA Centurion aircraft.

== Helios Prototype ==
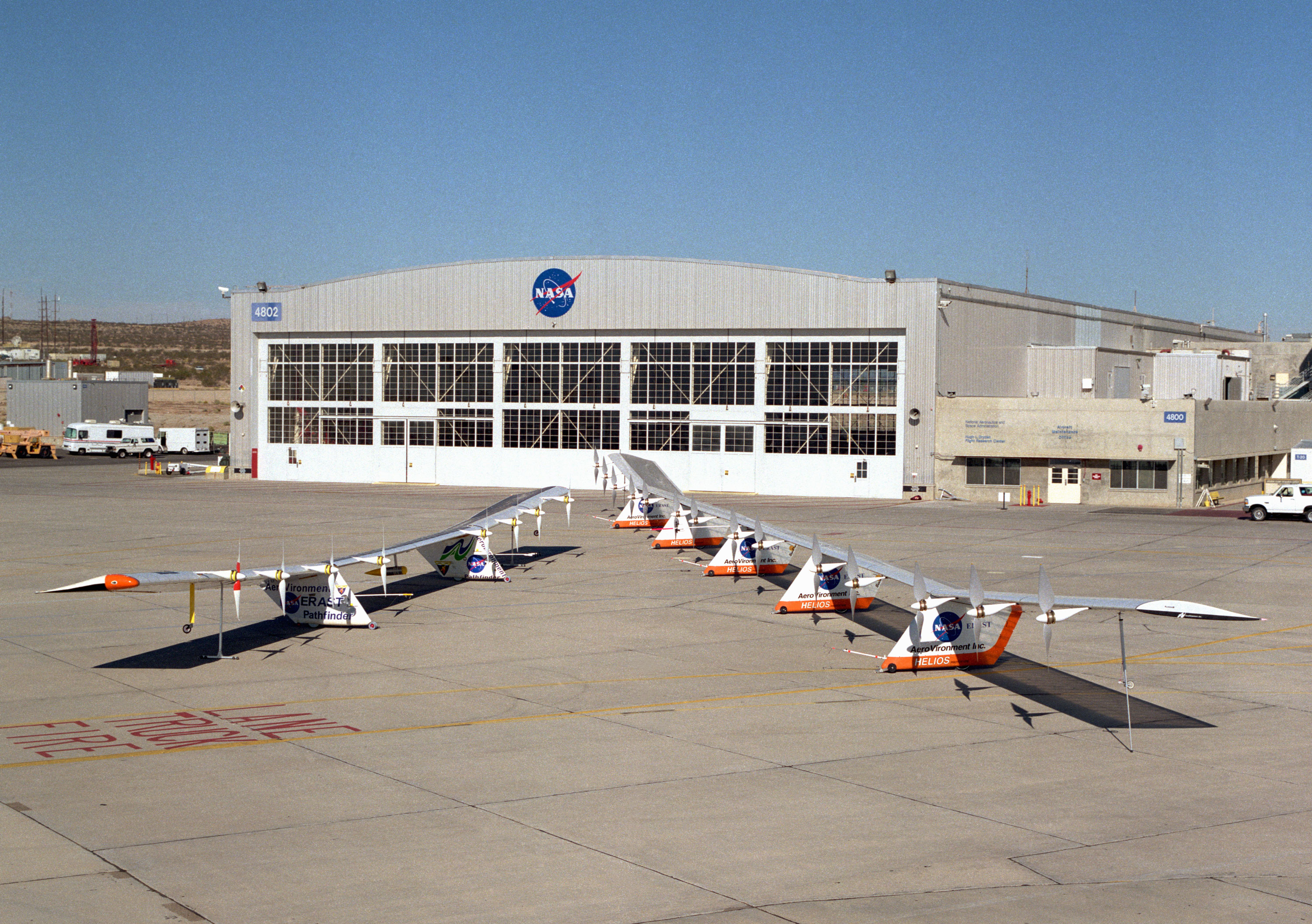
Pathfinder Plus (left) and Helios Prototype (right) on the Dryden ramp

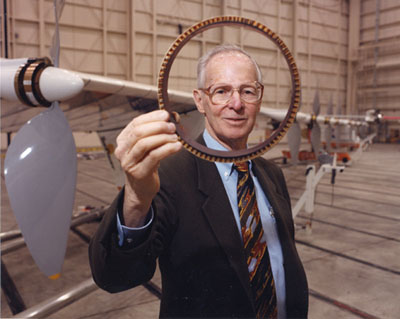
AeroVironment Chairman Paul MacCready shows a cross section of the AeroVironment/Helios Prototype wing spar.

The NASA Centurion was modified into the Helios Prototype configuration by adding a sixth 41 feet (12 m) wing section and a fifth landing gear and systems pod, becoming the fourth configuration in the series of solar-powered flying wing demonstrator aircraft developed by AeroVironment under the ERAST project. The larger wing on the Helios Prototype accommodated more solar arrays to provide adequate power for the sun-powered development flights that followed. The aircraft's maiden flight was on September 8, 1999.

The ERAST program had two goals when developing the Helios Prototype: 1) sustained flight at altitudes near 100,000 feet (30,000 m) and 2) endurance of at least 24 hours, including at least 14 of those hours above 50,000 feet (15,000 m). To this end, the Helios Prototype could be configured in two different ways. The first, designated HP01, focused on achieving the altitude goals and powered the aircraft with batteries and solar cells. The second configuration, HP03, optimized the aircraft for endurance, and used a combination of solar cells, storage batteries and a modified commercial hydrogen–air fuel cell system for power at night. In this configuration, the number of motors was reduced from 14 to ten.

Using the traditional incremental or stairstep approach to flight testing, the Helios Prototype was first flown in a series of battery-powered development flights in late 1999 to validate the longer wing's performance and the aircraft's handling qualities. Instrumentation that was used for the follow-on solar-powered altitude and endurance flights was also checked out and calibrated during the initial low-altitude flights at NASA Dryden.

=== Aircraft description ===
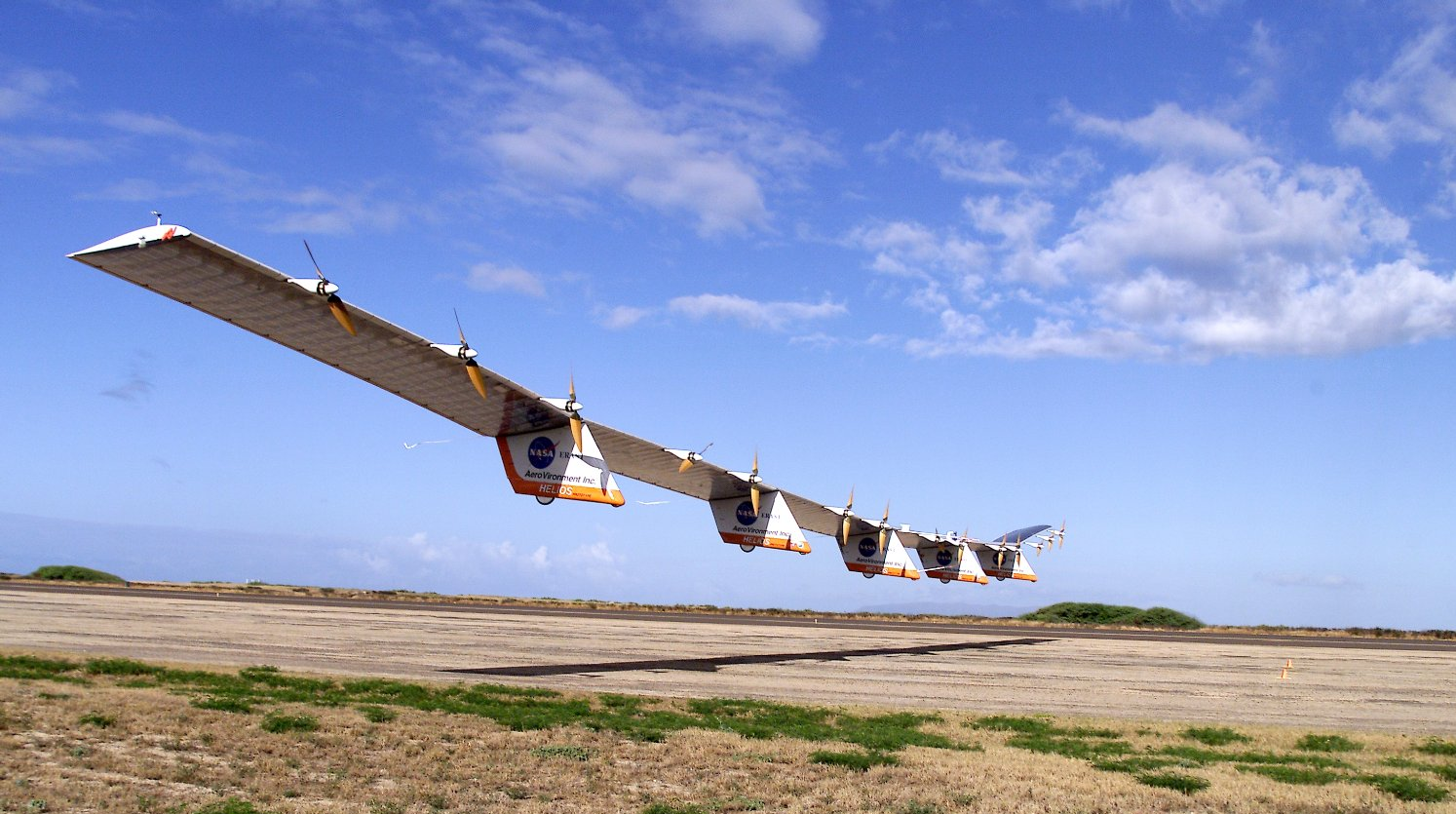
Helios Prototype flying wing moments after takeoff, beginning its first test flight on solar power from the U.S. Navy's Pacific Missile Range Facility on Kauai, Hawaii, July 14, 2001.

The Helios Prototype is an ultra-lightweight flying wing aircraft with a wingspan of 247 feet (75 m), longer than the wingspans of the U.S. Air Force C-5 military transport (222 feet (68 m)) or the Boeing 747 (195 or 224 feet (59 or 68 m), depending on the model), the two largest operational aircraft built in the United States. The electrically powered Helios was constructed mostly of composite materials such as carbon fiber, graphite epoxy, Kevlar, Styrofoam, and a thin, transparent plastic skin. The main tubular wing spar was made of carbon fiber. The spar, which was thicker on the top and bottom to absorb the constant bending motions that occur during flight, was also wrapped with Nomex and Kevlar for additional strength. The wing ribs were also made of epoxy and carbon fiber. Shaped Styrofoam was used for the wing's leading edge and a durable clear plastic film covered the entire wing.

The Helios Prototype shared the same 8-foot (2.4 m) wing chord (distance from leading to trailing edge) as its Pathfinder and Centurion predecessors. The 247-foot (75 m) wingspan gave the Helios Prototype an aspect ratio of almost 31 to 1. The wing thickness was the same from tip to tip, 11.5 inches (29 cm) or 12 percent of the chord, and it had no taper or sweep. The outer panels had a built-in 10-degree dihedral to give the aircraft more lateral stability. A slight upward twist at the tips of the trailing edge helped prevent wing tip stalls during the slow landings and turns. The wing area was 1,976 sq ft (183.6 m^{2})., which gave the craft a maximum wing loading of only 0.81 lb./sq. ft. when flying at a gross weight of 1,600 lb.

The all-wing aircraft was assembled in six sections, each about 41 feet (12 m) long. An underwing pod was attached at each panel joint to carry the landing gear, the battery power system, flight control computers, and data instrumentation. The five aerodynamically shaped pods were made mostly of the same materials as the wing itself, with the exception of the transparent wing covering. Two wheels on each pod made up the fixed landing gear—rugged mountain bike wheels on the rear and smaller scooter wheels on the front.

The only flight control surfaces used on the Helios Prototype were 72 trailing-edge elevators that provided pitch control. Spanning the entire wing, they were operated by tiny servomotors linked to the aircraft's flight control computer. To turn the aircraft in flight, yaw control was applied using differential power on the motors — speeding up the motors on one outer wing panel while slowing down motors on the other outer panel. A major test during the initial flight series was the evaluation of differential motor power as a means of pitch control. During normal cruise the outer wing panels of Helios were arched upward and give the aircraft the shape of a shallow crescent when viewed from the front or rear. This configuration placed the motors on the outer wing panels higher than the motors on the center panels. Speeding up the outer-panel motors caused the aircraft to pitch down and begin a descent. Conversely, applying additional power to the motors in the center panels caused Helios to pitch up and begin climbing.

From 2000 to 2001, the HP01 received a number of upgrades, including new avionics, high-altitude environmental control systems and SunPower solar array composed of more than 62,000 solar cells installed on the upper wing surface. These cells featured a rear-contact cell design that placed wires on the underside of the cells, so as not to obstruct the cells' exposure to solar radiation.

=== Records ===
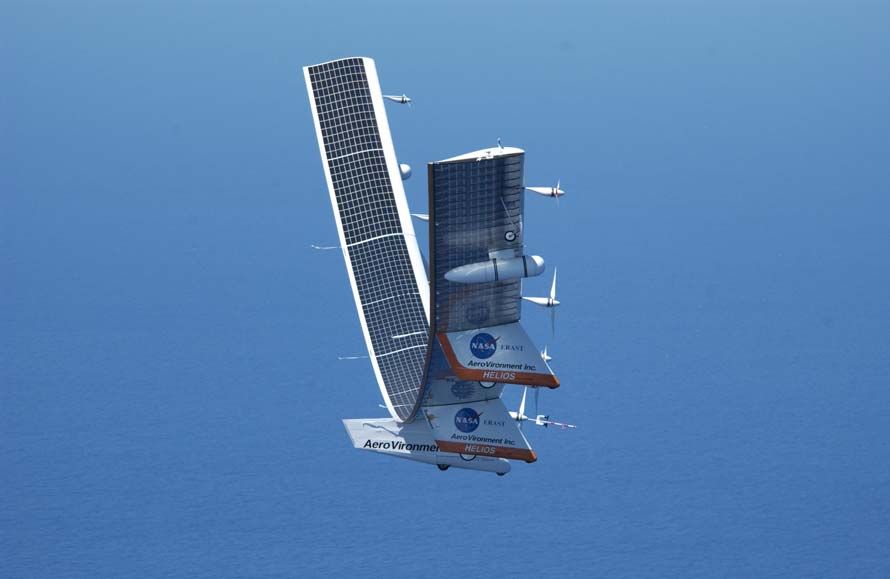
Helios with very high wing dihedral just before breaking up

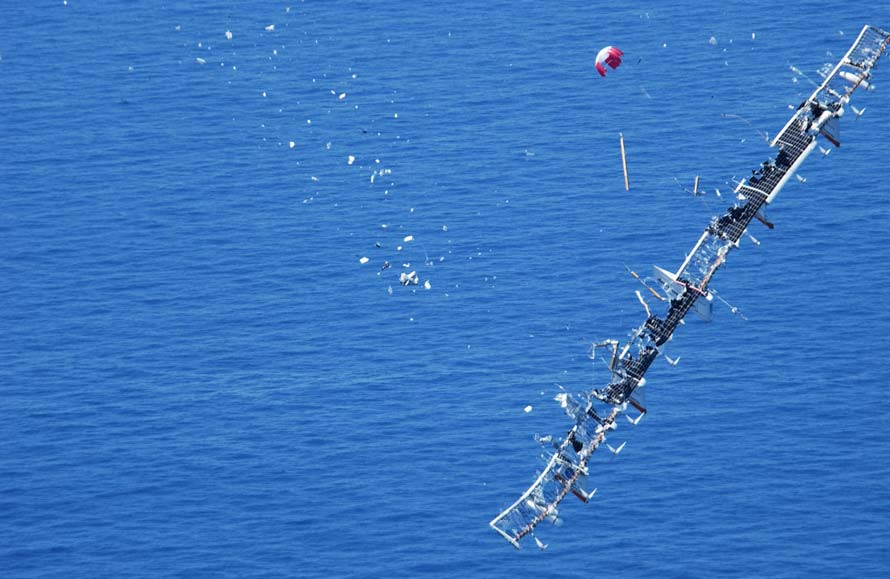
Helios disintegrates as it falls towards the Pacific

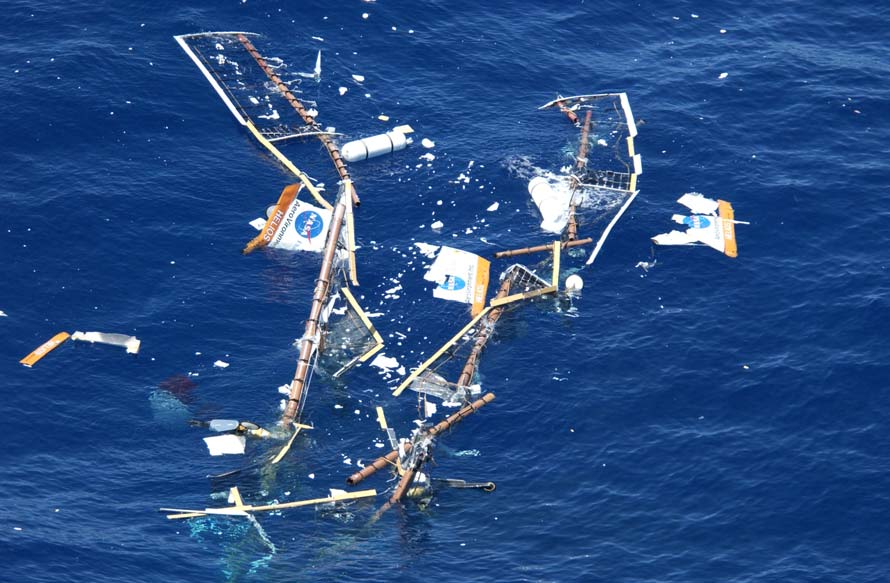
Wreckage of Helios in the Pacific

On August 13, 2001, the Helios Prototype piloted remotely by Greg Kendall reached an altitude of 96,863 feet (29,524 m), a world record for sustained horizontal flight by a winged aircraft. The altitude reached was more than 11,000 feet (3,400 m) — or more than 2 miles (3.2 km) — above the previous altitude record for sustained flight by a winged aircraft. In addition, the aircraft spent more than 40 minutes above 96,000 feet (29,000 m).

=== Crash ===
On June 26, 2003, the Helios Prototype broke up and fell into the Pacific Ocean about ten miles (16 km) west of the Hawaiian Island Kauai during a remotely piloted systems checkout flight in preparation for an endurance test scheduled for the following month.

On the morning of the accident, weather forecasts indicated that conditions were inside the acceptable envelope, although during the preflight go/no-go review, the weather forecaster gave it a "very marginal GO." One of the primary concerns was a pair of wind shear zones off the island's coast. After a delayed take off, due to the failure of the winds to shift as predicted, Helios spent more time than expected flying through a zone of low-level turbulence on the lee side of Kauai, because it was climbing more slowly than normal, since it had to contend with cloud shadows and the resultant reduction in solar power.

As the aircraft climbed through 2,800 feet (850 m) 30 minutes into the flight, according to the subsequent mishap investigation report, "the aircraft encountered turbulence and morphed into an unexpected, persistent, high dihedral configuration. As a result of the persistent high dihedral, the aircraft became unstable in a very divergent pitch mode in which the airspeed excursions from the nominal flight speed about doubled every cycle of the oscillation. The over-speed condition was exacerbated when the pilot turned off the airspeed hold loop instead of executing the correct emergency procedure and increasing the airspeed hold loop gain. The aircraft’s design airspeed was subsequently exceeded and the resulting high dynamic pressures caused the wing leading edge secondary structure on the outer wing panels to fail and the solar cells and skin on the upper surface of the wing to rip off. The aircraft impacted the ocean within the confines of the Pacific Missile Range Facility test range and was destroyed. Most of the vehicle structure was recovered except the hydrogen–air fuel cell pod and two of the ten motors, which sank into the ocean."

The investigation report identified a two-part root cause of the accident:

1. "Lack of adequate analysis methods led to an inaccurate risk assessment of the effects of configuration changes leading to an inappropriate decision to fly an aircraft configuration highly sensitive to disturbances."
2. "Configuration changes to the aircraft, driven by programmatic and technological constraints, altered the aircraft from a spanloader to a highly point-loaded mass distribution on the same structure significantly reducing design robustness and margins of safety."

== Specifications ==
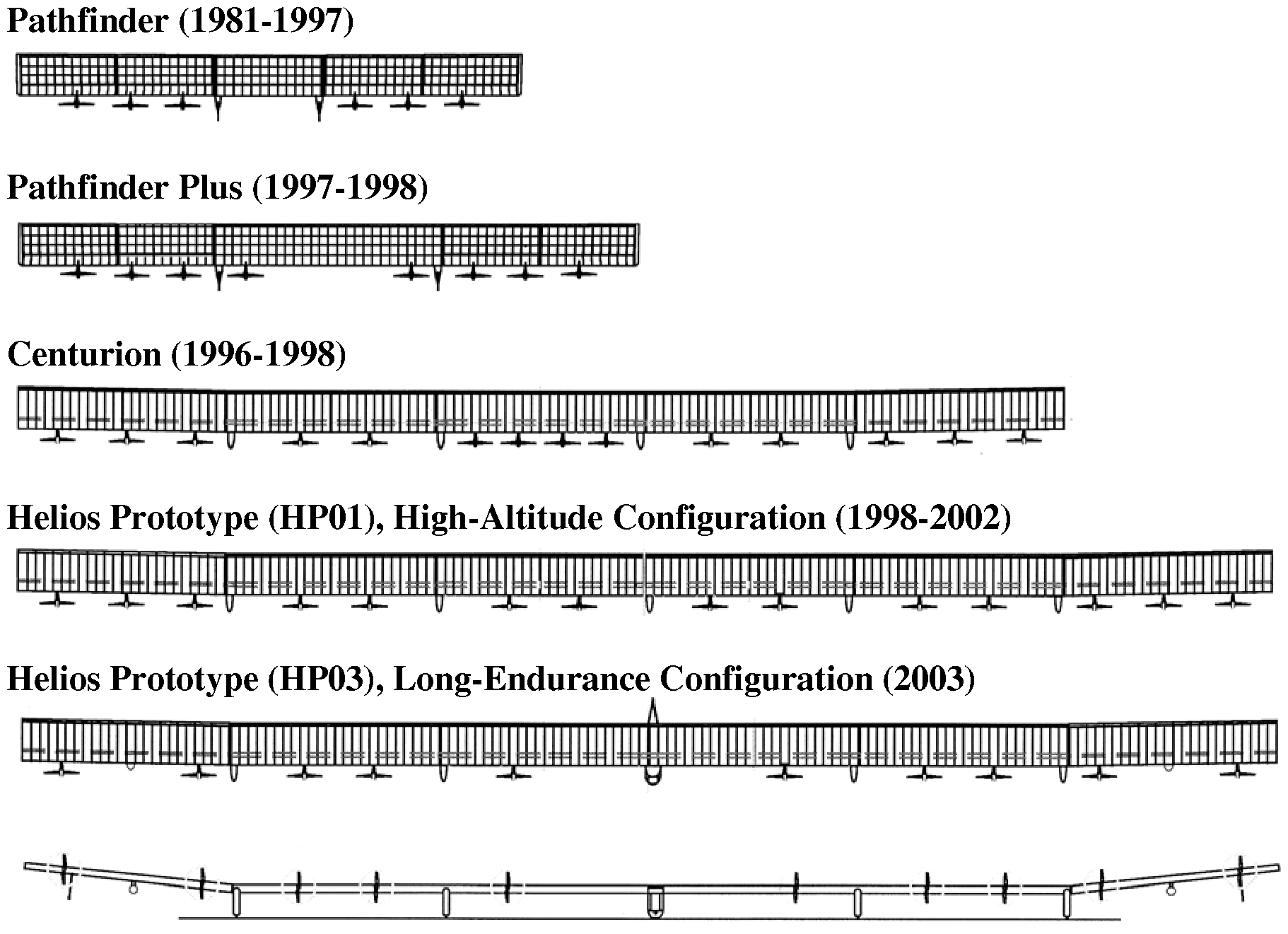
Solar Aircraft Evolution through the ERAST Program

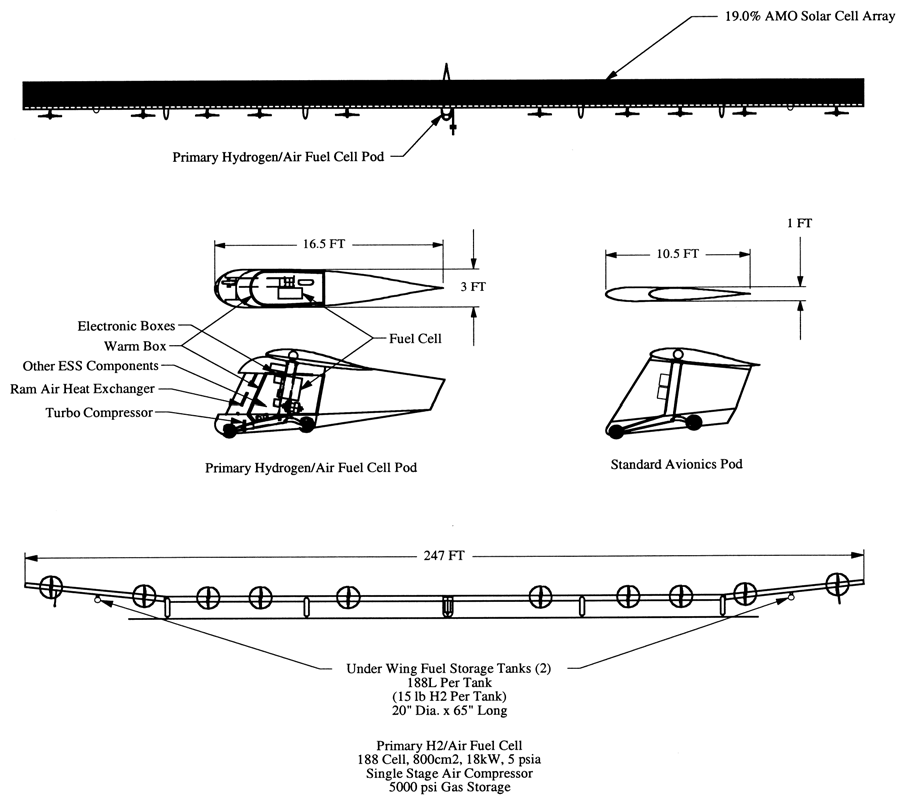
Schematic of Helios HP03 Hydrogen-Air Fuel Cell Configuration

Specifications
	Pathfinder	Pathfinder-Plus	Centurion	Helios HP01	Helios HP03
Length ft (m)	12 (3.6)	12 (3.6)	12 (3.6)	12 (3.6)	16.5 (5.0)
Chord ft (m)	8 (2.4)				
Wingspan ft (m)	98.4 (29.5)	121 (36.3)	206 (61.8)	247 (75.3)	
Aspect ratio	12 to 1	15 to 1	26 to 1	30.9 to 1	
Glide ratio	18 to 1	21 to 1	?	?	?
Airspeed kts (km/h)			15–18 (27–33)	16.5–23.5 (30.6–43.5)	?
Max altitude ft (m)	71,530 (21,802)	80,201 (24,445)	n/a	96,863 (29,523)	65,000 (19,812)
Empty Wt lb (kg)	?	?	?	1,322 (600)	?
Max. weight lb (kg)	560 (252)	700 (315)	1,900 (862)	2,048 (929)	2,320 (1,052)
Payload lb (kg)	100 (45)	150 (67,5)	100–600 (45–270)	726 (329)	?
Engines	electric, 2 hp (1.5 kW) each				
No. of engines	6	8	14	14	10
Solar pwr output (kW)	7.5	12.5	31	?	18.5
Supplemental power	batteries	batteries	batteries	Li batteries	Li batteries, fuel cell

== See also ==
The footage shows the Helios in the air

- History of unmanned aerial vehicles
- Electric aircraft
- Regenerative fuel cell
- NASA Pathfinder (First flew in June 1983)
- NASA Centurion (First flight 10 November 1998)
- QinetiQ/Airbus Zephyr (First flight in 2008)
- Facebook Aquila (First flight 28 June 2016)
- SoftBank/AeroVironment HAPSMobile (First flight 11 September 2019)
- BAE Systems PHASA-35 (First flight 17 February 2020)
