= VTOL X-Plane =

American experimental aircraft

External image
- Previous attempts only works in Microsoft Internet Explorer

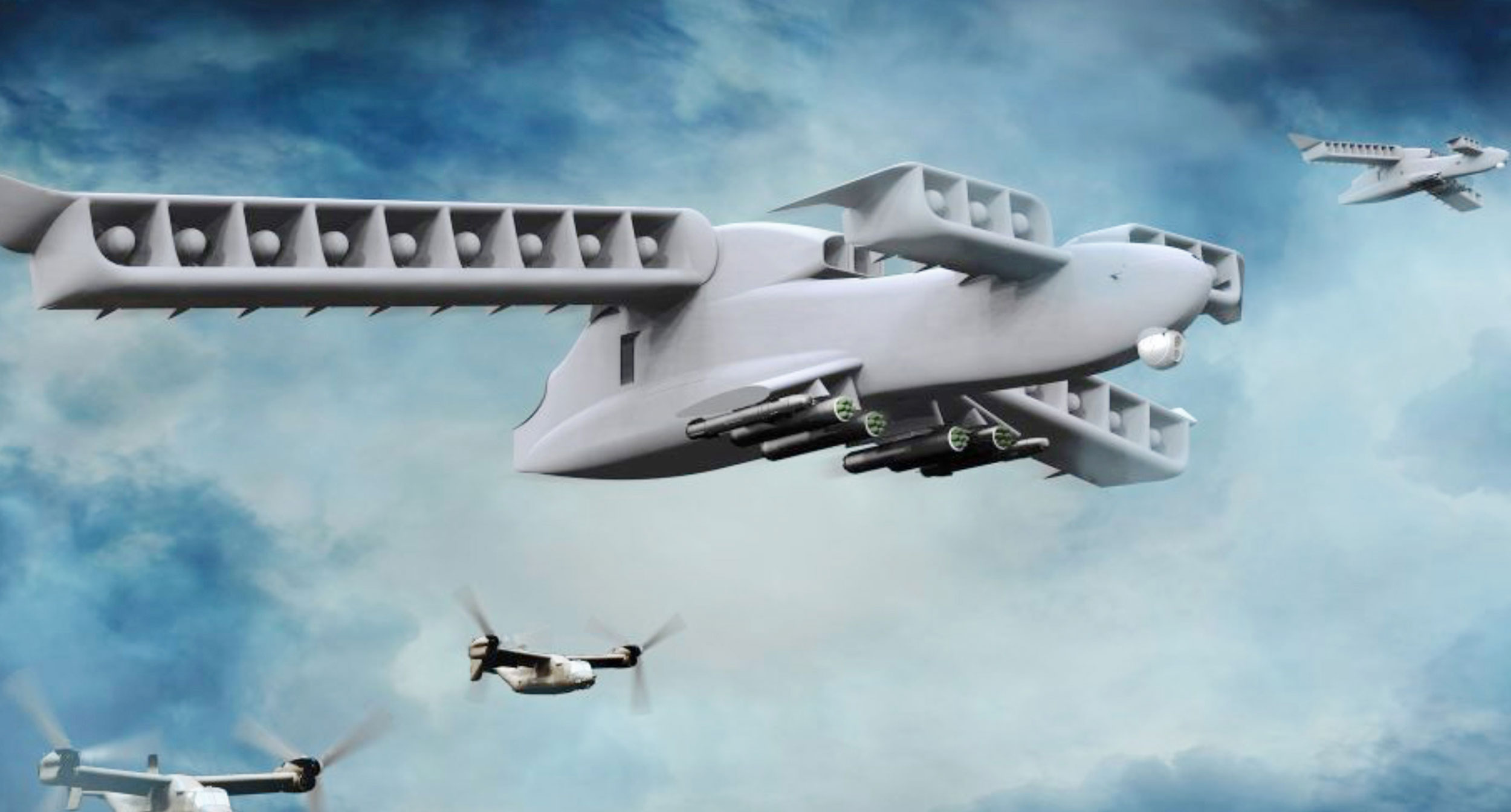
Aurora LightningStrike

The Vertical Take-Off and Landing Experimental Aircraft (VTOL X-Plane) program was an American research project sponsored by the Defense Advanced Research Projects Agency (DARPA). The goal of the program was to demonstrate a VTOL aircraft design that can take off vertically and efficiently hover, while flying faster than conventional rotorcraft. There have been many previous attempts, most of them unsuccessful as of 2015.

A helicopter with a conventional rotor layout has a theoretical top speed of 200 knots (230 mph; 370 km/h), after which it suffers from dissymmetry of lift. Some designs have successfully created hovering and high-speed aircraft, including the Bell Boeing V-22 Osprey tiltrotor that can fly at 275 knots (316 mph; 509 km/h) and the Sikorsky X2 compound helicopter that flew at 260 knots (300 mph; 480 km/h), but both made significant aerodynamic compromises to hovering efficiency or range. DARPA's goal was to demonstrate a VTOL aircraft that can achieve a sustained top speed of 300 to 400 knots (345 to 460 mph (555 to 740 km/h)).

All competitors for the program opted to demonstrate their concepts using an unmanned aerial vehicle even though it was not required, but the technologies were intended to be applied to manned aircraft as well.

Aurora Flight Sciences was selected to create a test design, which would fly in 2018. DARPA canceled the program in 2018 before the flight testing, citing growing commercial interest and the lack of a military partner.

In September 2022, DARPA initiated the ANCILLARY program to develop a small VTOL uncrewed aerial system (UAS) with low weight, high payload, and long endurance capabilities, X-plane flight tests scheduled for 2026.

== Requirement and programme ==
DARPA announced the programme in February 2013 with a requirement to create a new aircraft that uses the best features from both vertical take-off and landing technology and that used for conventional aircraft. The hybrid aircraft will try to improve on four areas:

- Speed - achieve a top speed of at least 300 kts.
- Hover - increase hover efficiency to at least 75 percent.
- Cruise efficiency - achieve a lift-to-drag ratio of at least 10.
- Load - ensure the solution can carry a useful load of at least 40% of the projected gross weight.

== Phase One - Preliminary design study ==
The first two companies to be involved were announced in December 2013 when Sikorsky Aircraft was awarded a US$14.4 million contract and Aurora Flight Sciences was given US$14 million for preliminary design studies as part of the $47 million Phase One budget.

On 18 March 2014, DARPA announced that Sikorsky, Aurora Flight Sciences, Boeing, and Karem Aircraft had been selected to compete for the VTOL X-plane. The four companies have based their designs on unmanned aircraft and will compete over the next 20 months. The name of Aurora's submission was revealed as the LightningStrike in February and although the design was unknown, the company has a history of producing ducted fan and hybrid propulsion aircraft. Karem Aircraft was expected to propose a tiltrotor aircraft with an optimum speed rotor. The Boeing PhantomSwift embedded twin lifting fans inside the fuselage with tilting ducted fans mounted on wingtips for lift and forward thrust; a scale demonstrator was built and flown by the company in 2013. Sikorsky teamed with Lockheed Martin for a "low complexity" design that combined fixed wing aerodynamics and advanced rotor control. A single design was to be selected in autumn 2015 for a $95 million contract to build a demonstrator in phase 2.

- Rotor Blown Wing - Sikorsky and Lockheed Martin teamed to develop their unmanned rotor blown wing concept. They claimed it integrated fixed wing aerodynamics and advanced rotor control to provide a low complexity configuration. An artist depiction of Sikorsky's Rotor Blown Wing bore visual resemblance to the Boeing Heliwing, an unmanned tailsitter intended to reach 180 kn (210 mph; 330 km/h) in forward flight; it first flew in April 1995 but crashed in July and the project was shelved. Sikorsky confirmed that the Rotor Blown Wing would be a tailsitter, with its name suggesting that the wing remains aligned into the proprotor wash during transition between vertical and forward, reducing download on the wing in hover mode.
- LightningStrike - Aurora Flight Sciences' LightningStrike would achieve high overall efficiency by integrating the propulsion into the air vehicle's aerodynamic design. The company has experience with ducted-fan designs through Goldeneye series aircraft, also under DARPA programs, and with hybrid-electric propulsion with the Excalibur unmanned aerial vehicle proof-of-concept aircraft to create a design providing vertical takeoff and landing with high-speed horizontal flight. Levering this experience Aurora Flight Sciences' developed a revolutionary vehicle concept that employs Electric Distributed Propulsion (EDP) in eighteen 31 in (79 cm) wing fans, and six 21 in (53 cm) canard fans, driven by 3 MW of electricity.
- Karem tiltrotor - Karem Aircraft submitted a tiltrotor concept called TR36XP, employing a slender-bodied fuselage with a high-aspect-ratio gull wing. The outer sections of the wing, together with two 36 ft rotor/propellers, rotated through 90 degrees for transition between hover and forward flight, powered by two Rolls-Royce Turbomeca RTM322.
- PhantomSwift - Boeing's PhantomSwift concept had two large internal fans to provide lift with two wingtip fans that provide stability while hovering. In forward flight, the internal fans stop supplying power and the wingtip fans provide thrust. Boeing claimed that this configuration was 50 percent more efficient in the hover than a typical helicopter, and expected to have a top speed of 740 km/h (460 mph; 400 kn). The full-size version would have had a wingspan of 50 ft (15 m), a fuselage length of 44 ft (13 m), and weigh 12,000 lb (5,400 kg). The demonstrator would be powered by one or two General Electric CT7-8 engines, but a production version would be powered by an all-electric drive.

== Phase Two ==
The design, development and integration phase is expected to last 18-months; Phase Two will allow companies to mature their designs.

On 3 March 2016, DARPA awarded Aurora Flight Sciences $89.4 million to build and demonstrate their LightningStrike concept, beating out the other three competitors. The LightningStrike is a tilting-wing design powered by one Rolls-Royce AE1107C turboshaft engine, the same type used on the V-22 Osprey, that generates electric power via three Honeywell generators to run 24 distributed ducted fans, three each in the forward canards and 18 across the main wing. Rather than using conventional engines like all the other entrants, the aircraft relies on "distributed electric propulsion," where the three generators that produce three megawatts (4,023 horsepower) of electricity, as much as a commercial wind turbine, power individual motors that drive the fans; each wing fan uses a 100 kW motor, and each canard fan a 70 kW motor. The air vehicle will weigh between 10,000–12,000 lb (4,500–5,400 kg), about the size of a UH-1Y Venom, and cruise faster than 300 knots, 50 knots faster than the V-22. Phase II of the VTOL X-Plane project will fabricate two air vehicles before flight testing, planned by September 2018. A 20 percent-scale demonstrator, weighing 325 lb (147 kg) using wings and canards made of carbon composites and 3D-printed plastics, was flown on 29 March 2016. The full-scale aircraft will be designated the XV-24A.

== Phase Three ==
Phase Three was to last 12-months from February 2017 to February 2018 and consist of ground and flight tests of the experimental designs.

DARPA cancelled the project before flight testing.
