= Electra EL-2 Goldfinch =

Type of technology demonstrator aircraft

EL-2 Goldfinch
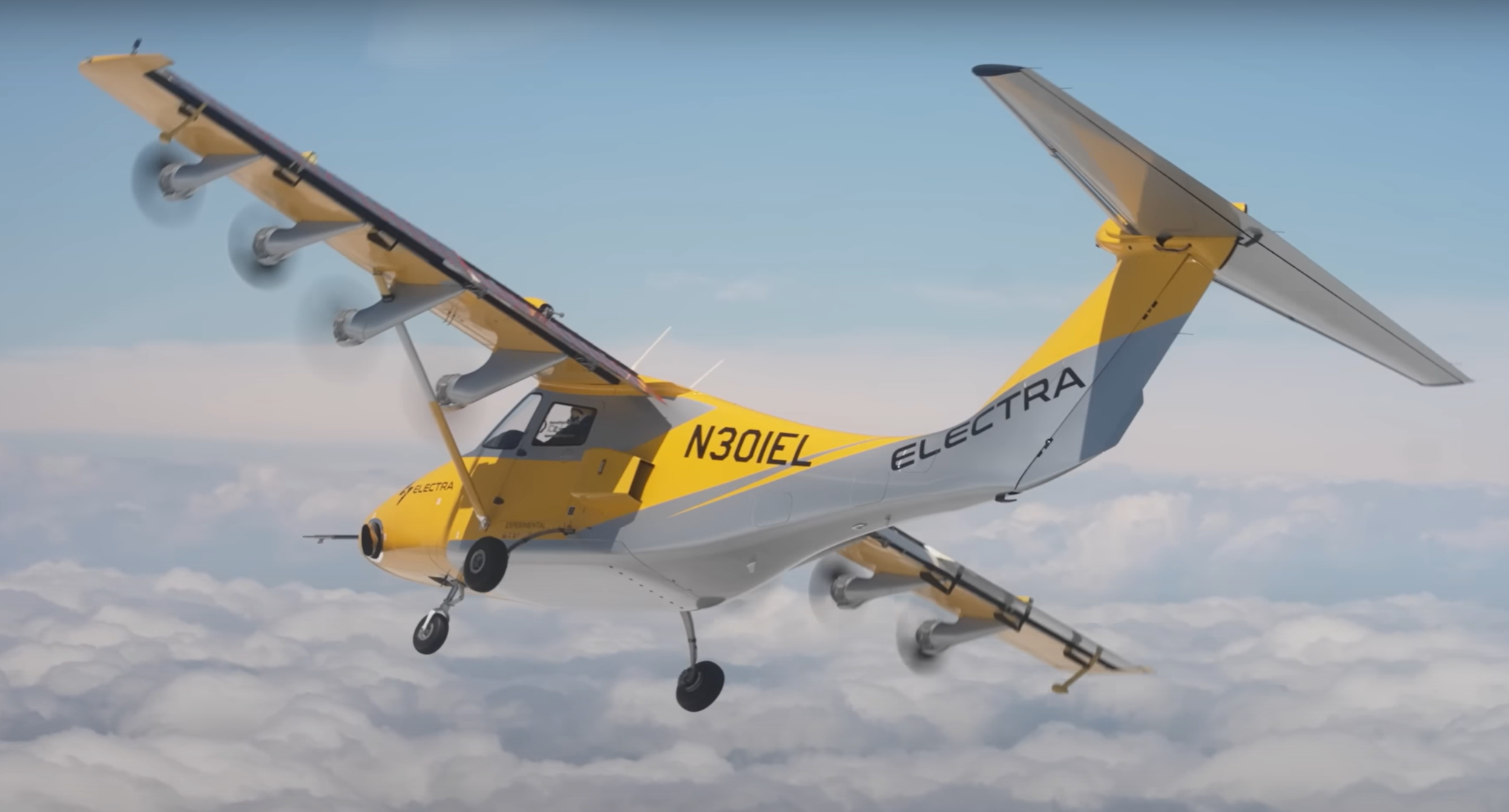
- The EL-2 entering a turn

General information
- Type: Hybrid electric aircraft, STOL
- National origin: United States
- Manufacturer: Electra.aero
- Number built: 1

History
- First flight: November 11, 2023

The Electra EL-2 Goldfinch is a technology demonstrator developed by American startup Electra.aero. The EL-2 is a hybrid electric aircraft with distributed propulsion for short takeoff and landing (STOL).

== Development ==
Electra creator John Langford founded Aurora Flight Sciences in 1989, sold to Boeing in 2017.

The first test flight happened on November 11, 2023, all-electric powered, from Manassas Regional Airport in Virginia. On November 17, it flew again for 23 minutes, powered by its hybrid-electric drivetrain, reaching 3,200 ft (980 m). Electra.aero wants to develop a nine passenger-aircraft (or 2,500 lb (1,100 kg) of cargo) capable of operating from an area soccer field-sized with a 150 ft (50 m) ground roll, for a 500 mi (800 km) range. The company aims to fly a full-scale prototype in 2026, then a certification test aircraft targeted for a 2028 introduction.

By late April 2024, the demonstrator had flown for over 10 hours and had achieved 150 ft (46 m) landings and 175 ft (53 m) takeoffs. Its longest flight exceeded 1.5 hrs, its highest altitude reached was 6,500 ft (2,000 m), and its lowest speed achieved is 25 kn (46 km/h). Electra.aero envisions a 200-seat turboelectric airliner for 2040, for which it has submitted a proposal for the NASA Advanced Aircraft Concepts for Environmental Sustainability.

Electra.aero uses a hybrid powertrain as lithium-ion batteries pack not enough energy, only 170 Wh/kg in the Pipistrel Velis Electro in 2020, approaching 235 Wh/kg at the pack level for 2025. The Advanced Research Projects Agency-Energy (ARPA-E) has launched the Propel-1K program to demonstrate a 1,000 Wh/kg (1,600 kJ/lb) cell by mid-2025.

== Design ==
The Goldfinch has a turbogenerator in the nose for hybrid propulsion and battery packs under the floor for all-electric operation. It has a two-person cockpit and a gross weight of 3,100 lb (1,400 kg). To take off at 30–35 kn (56–65 km/h) it has a blown-lift wing, generating a pitching moment balanced by a large T-tail. It has a modified Cessna 172 wing, and its 150 kW (200 hp) powertrain employs a helicopter auxiliary power unit while its battery packs handle peak power. The EL2 is quieter than a conventional turbine aircraft, generating 75 decibels of noise at 300 ft (90 m) and 55 dBAs at 500 ft (150 m).

== Specifications ==
Data from Aviation Week

General characteristics

- Crew: 1-2
- Gross weight: 3,100 lb (1,406 kg)
- Fuel capacity: fuel + battery packs
- Powerplant: 1 × turbogenerator , 200 hp (150 kW)

Performance

- Minimum control speed: 25 kn (29 mph, 46 km/h)

== See also ==
- NASA X-57 Maxwell
