= ARMD =

ARMD may refer to:

- Aeronautics Research Mission Directorate, within NASA
- Age-related macular degeneration, a type of vision loss
- ATAPI removable media device, a type of computing storage
