= Research and Technology Mission Directorate =

NASA mission directorate

The Aeronautics Research Mission Directorate (ARMD) is one of five mission directorates within NASA, the other four being the Exploration Systems Development Mission Directorate, the Space Operations Mission Directorate, the Science Mission Directorate, and the Space Technology Mission Directorate. The ARMD is responsible for NASA's aeronautical research, which benefits the commercial, military, and general aviation sectors. The current NASA associate administrator heading ARMD is Robert A. Pearce who has held the position since 2019.

ARMD is involved in the creation of the Next Generation Air Transportation System (NextGen).

A 2014 audit by the NASA Office of Inspector General reported that ARMD "solicits input from industry, academia, and other Federal agencies regarding research needs and...uses this information to develop its research plans", and concluded that the directorate supported "advancement of the nation's civil aeronautics research and technology objectives consistent with the National Plan" established in 2006.

ARMD performs its aeronautics research at four NASA facilities: Ames Research Center and Armstrong Flight Research Center in California, Glenn Research Center in Ohio, and Langley Research Center in Virginia.

== Funding ==
According to a 2012 report by the National Academies of Sciences, Engineering, and Medicine, NASA's aeronautics budget declined from over $1 billion in 2000 to $570 million in 2010, while shrinking from approximately seven percent of NASA's total budget in 2000 to around three percent in 2010. Its staffing decreased by approximately four percent between 2006 and 2010. The result was the elimination of much flight research, hindering the advance of technologies and causing some research projects to collapse. In addition, the ambition of flight research projects decreased with respect to technical complexity, risk, and benefit to the nation. This decreased ambition was attributed to a risk-averse culture within NASA's aeronautics programs, as well as to budget reductions.

As of 2011, 56% of NASA's aeronautics budget went to fundamental research, 25% to integrated systems research, and 14% to facility maintenance. Its budget breakdown by NASA Center was 32% to Langley, 25% to Glenn, 23% to Ames, 13% to Dryden (Armstrong), and 7% to NASA Headquarters. By expense category, 56% of the budget was dedicated to labor costs, 13% to research announcements, and 30% to procurement.

For fiscal 2019, its budget request for aeronautics research was cut by 3.3% to $634 million after four years between $640 and $660 million before being cut by 2.5% to $609 million from fiscal 2020. The supersonic demonstrator for low sonic boom will get $88 million: after a preliminary Lockheed Martin design was reviewed in June 2017, a contract should be awarded in early April 2018 to design and build the single-seat, single-engine craft before its critical design review scheduled for fiscal 2019, and flying in January 2021. $5 million will go for hypersonics research.

$101 million will be spent on other flight research including the X-57 Maxwell to demonstrate a three times lower energy usage with electric aircraft in 2019. The AAVP seeks $231 million for 2019, targeting a 5–10 MW (6,700–13,400 hp) hybrid airliner turbine-electric propulsion system focused on superconducting motors. The NEAT should test a megawatt powertrain in fiscal 2019 before the 2.6-megawatt STARC-ABL ingestion system. Boeing’s Mach 0.78 Truss-Braced wing concept High-speed wind-tunnel testing is planned for fiscal 2019. The Airspace Operations and Safety Program ($91 million in 2019) includes ATM-X to support urban air mobility in national airspace: automated trajectory negotiation and management flights are planned for January 2019, followed by dynamic scheduling and congestion management.

== Programs ==
The ARMD oversees four mission programs:

- The Advanced Air Vehicles Program (AAVP), which develops technologies to improve vehicle performance. AAVP projects include research into aeronautics, composite materials, supersonic technology, and vertical lift technology.
- The Airspace Operations and Safety Program (AOSP), which works with the FAA to develop technologies to support NextGen and improve navigation automation and safety.
- The Integrated Aviation Systems Program (IASP), which includes the Environmentally Responsible Aviation (ERA) project and the integration of unmanned aircraft systems into the National Airspace System, and conducts flight test operations.
- The Transformative Aeronautics Concepts Program (TACP), which creates early-stage concepts, develops computational and experimental tools, and awards research grants to industry and university teams.

=== Advanced Air Transportation Technology project ===
The Passive Aeroelastic Tailored (PAT) wing was designed for more structural efficiency by a team of the ARMD, the University of Michigan and Boeing-owned Aurora Flight Sciences. A 39 ft (12 m) long, 29% scale of a Boeing 777-like wing was built by Aurora in Columbus, Mississippi, with a conventional configuration: two spars and 58 ribs. The skin thickness varies with the load from 0.75 in (19 mm) inboard tapering to 4 mm (0.16 in) at the tip. To aligns fibers with the load, tow-steered laminates curve along the wing span unlike current composites with 0°, ±45° and ±90° laid down and cut plies. Being more flexible but with controlled stiffness, gust loads and flutter are passively suppressed. Loads tests began in September 2018 and went up to 85% of the design limit in October, halted by load oscillations. It could be coupled with active gust load alleviation from NASA Langley and the X-56A flexible wing for active flutter-suppression.

== See also ==
- ecoDemonstrator
- NASA GL-10 Greased Lightning
- NASA X-57 Maxwell
