= NASA X-57 Maxwell =

Canceled experimental NASA electric aircraft

X-57 Maxwell
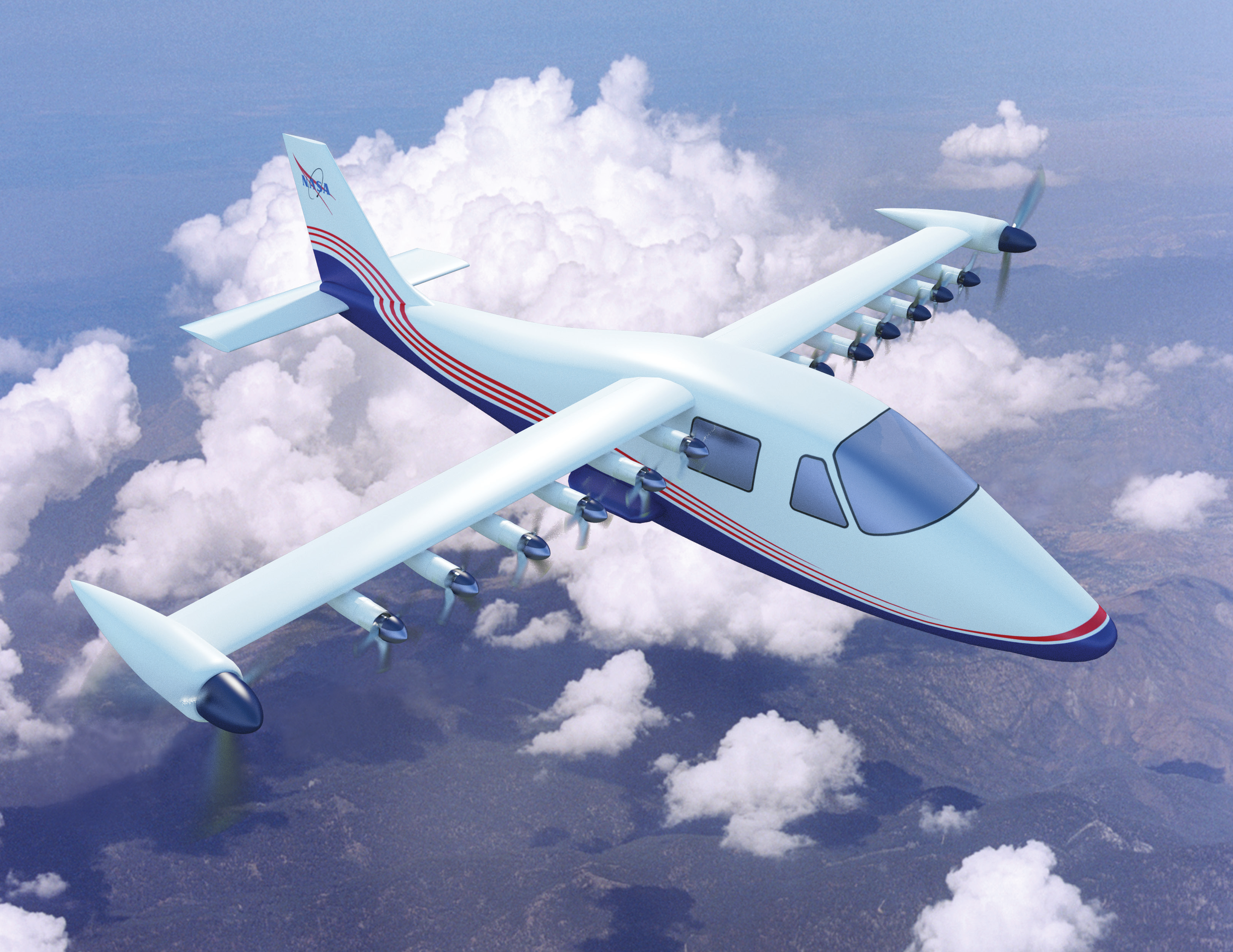
- Artist's concept of the X-57 (Mod IV)

General information
- Type: Experimental light aircraft
- National origin: United States
- Manufacturer: ESAero
- Status: Canceled (June 2023)
- Primary user: NASA

History
- Developed from: Tecnam P2006T

The NASA X-57 Maxwell was an experimental aircraft developed by NASA, intended to demonstrate technology to reduce fuel use, emissions, and noise. The first flight of the X-57 was scheduled to take place in 2023, but the program was canceled due to problems with the propulsion system.

== Development ==
The experiment involved replacing the wings on a twin-engined Italian-built Tecnam P2006T (a conventional four-seater light aircraft) with distributed electric propulsion (DEP) wings, each containing electrically driven propellers. Test flights were initially planned to commence in 2017.

The first test phase used an 18-engine truck-mounted wing. The second phase installed the cruise propellers and motors on a standard P2006T for ground- and flight-test experience. Phase 3 tests were to involve the high-lift DEP wing and demonstrate increased high-speed cruise efficiency. The leading-edge nacelles would be fitted, but the high-lift propellers, motors and controllers would not be installed. Phase 4 was to add the DEP motors and folding propellers to demonstrate lift-augmentation.

=== LEAPTech project ===
The Leading Edge Asynchronous Propeller Technology (LEAPTech) project is a NASA project developing an experimental electric aircraft technology involving many small electric motors driving individual small propellers distributed along the edge of each aircraft wing. To optimize performance, each motor can be operated independently at different speeds, decreasing reliance on fossil fuels, improving aircraft performance and ride quality, and reducing aircraft noise.

The LEAPTech project began in 2014 when researchers from NASA Langley Research Center and NASA Armstrong Flight Research Center partnered with two California companies, Empirical Systems Aerospace (ESAero) in Pismo Beach and Joby Aviation in Santa Cruz, California. ESAero is the prime contractor responsible for system integration and instrumentation, while Joby is responsible for design and manufacture of the electric motors, propellers, and carbon fiber wing section.

In 2015, NASA researchers were ground testing a 31 ft (9.4 m) span, carbon composite wing section with 18 electric motors powered by lithium iron phosphate batteries. Preliminary testing up to 40 mph (64 km/h; 35 kn) took place in January at Oceano County Airport on California's Central Coast. Mounted on a specially modified truck, it was tested at up to 70 mph (110 km/h; 61 kn) across a dry lakebed at Edwards Air Force Base later in 2015.

The experiment preceded the X-57 Maxwell X-plane demonstrator that was proposed under NASA's Transformative Aeronautics Concepts program. A piloted X-plane was slated to fly within a couple of years, after replacing a Tecnam P2006T wings and engines with an improved version of the LEAPTech wing and motors. Using an existing airframe would have allowed engineers to easily compare the performance of the X-plane with the original P2006T.

=== X-57 Maxwell ===
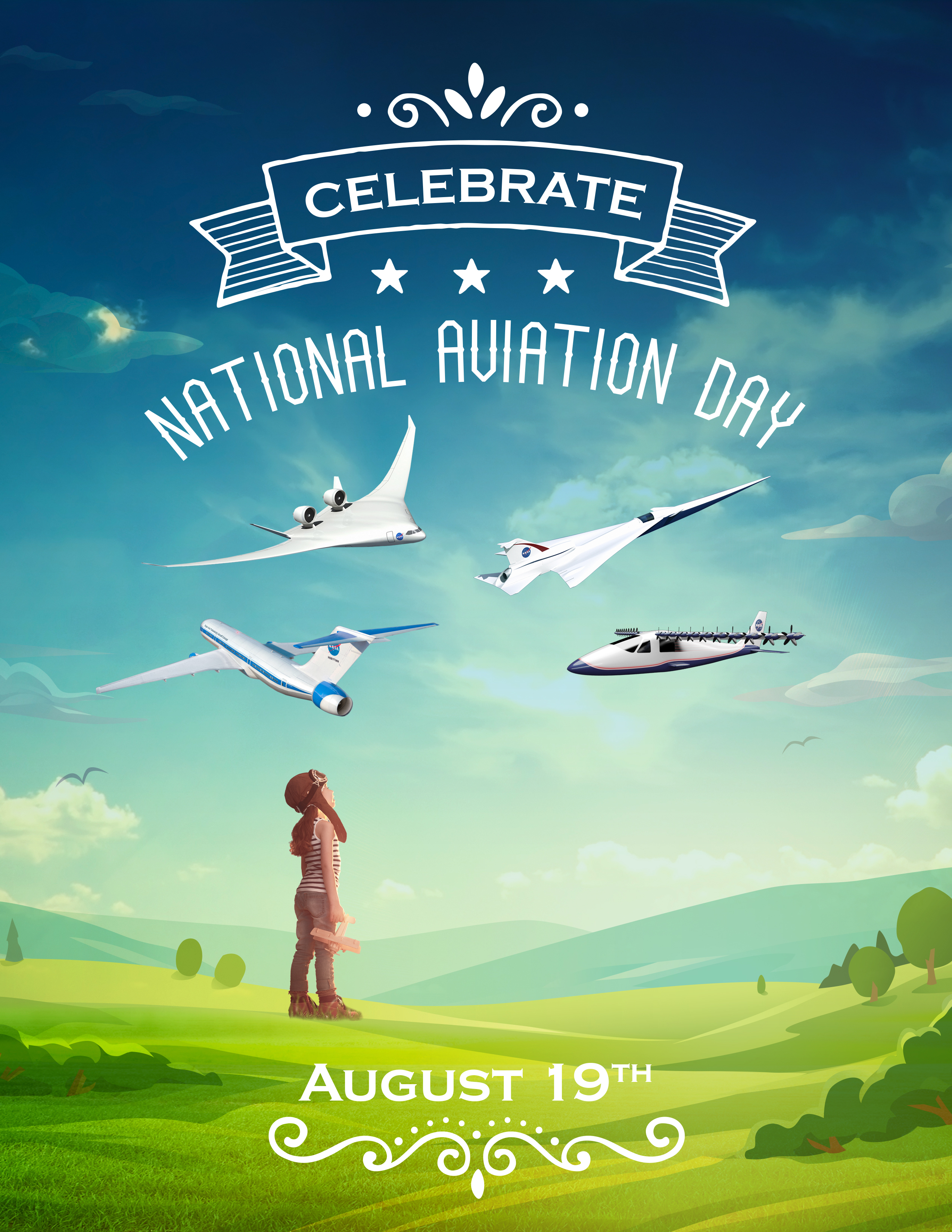
The Maxwell was included in an illustration for National Aviation Day 2016

The X-57 project was publicly revealed by NASA Administrator Charles Bolden on 17 June 2016 in a keynote speech to the American Institute of Aeronautics and Astronautics (AIAA) at its Aviation 2016 exposition. The plane was named for Scottish physicist James Clerk Maxwell.

NASA's first X-plane in over a decade, it is part of NASA's New Aviation Horizons initiative, which will also produce up to five larger-scale aircraft. The X-57 was built by the agency's SCEPTOR project, over a four-year development period at Armstrong Flight Research Center, California, with a first flight initially planned for 2017.

In July 2017, Scaled Composites was modifying a first P2006T to the X-57 Mod II configuration by replacing the piston engines with Joby Aviation electric motors, with plans to fly early in 2018. Mod III configuration will move the motors to the wingtips to increase propulsive efficiency. Mod IV configuration will see the installation of the Xperimental, LLC high aspect ratio wing with 12 smaller propellers along its leading edge to augment its takeoff and landing aerodynamic lift.

The donor Tecnam P2006T was received in California in July 2016. In a December 2016 test, a battery cell was shorted and the overheating spread to other cells, requiring the packaging to be redesigned from eight to sixteen modules with aluminum honeycomb separators. The Rotax 912s will be replaced by 60 kW (80 hp) electric motors for the Mod II. The Mod III weight target is 3,000 lb (1,400 kg) from the P2006T 2,700 lb (1,200 kg) and aims for 500% higher high-speed cruise efficiency as the smaller wing will reduce cruise drag, while wingtip propellers will counter the wingtip vortices. The Mod IV with 12 propellers to take off and land at the same speeds as the P2006T is yet unfunded.

In December 2017, the redesigned passively cooled battery module with 320 lithium-ion cell down from 640 passed testing. The experience helped Electric Power Systems develop a battery for the Bye Aerospace Sun Flyer 2 which made its first flight in April 2018. Joby Aviation delivered three cruise motors in 2017, and was assembling the final pair in June 2018. Motor acceptance testing involving an 80-hour endurance test was to be simplified before vehicle integration. It was planned that contractor ES Aero would lead extensive ground-tests over months, culminating in a mission-like 30 minutes at full power test, before flying within 2019.

By September 2018, the first Joby Aviation JM-X57 electric cruise motors were mounted with controllers, batteries and new cockpit displays at Scaled Composites in Mojave, with flight tests planned to begin in mid-2019. Construction of the ESAero high aspect ratio, low drag composite wing was then almost finished, to fly the Mod 3 by mid-2020.

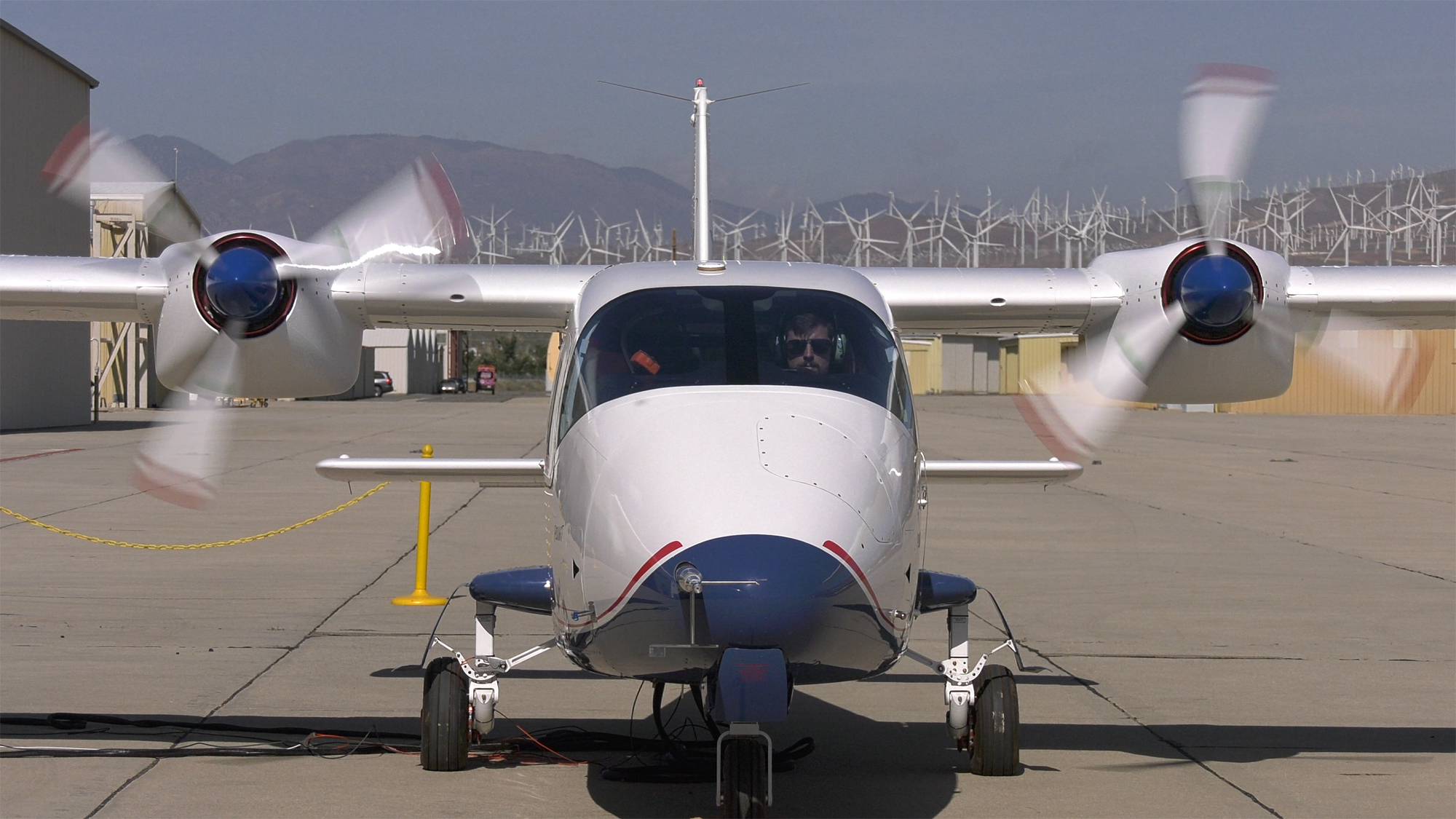
Mod II ground test of the new electric motors on the original wing, June 2019

Built by Xperimental, the cruise-optimized wing load testing was completed by September 2019, to ±120% of design load limit, verifying free movement of control surfaces and vibration testing for flutter predictions. After motor ground runs, ESAero was to deliver the Mod 2 X-plane with electric motors replacing the original piston engines to NASA Armstrong Flight Research Center in California on the first week of October. ESAero delivered it on October 2, 2019. At that time, systems ground tests were to start by the end of 2019, and flight tests were planned to begin in the third quarter of 2020.

By February 2021, NASA was to start Mod 2 high-voltage functional ground testing at the Armstrong Flight Research Center in Edwards, California, toward taxi tests and first flight.

In June 2023, the program was canceled due to safety problems discovered with the propulsion system that were not solvable within the allocated budget and time for the program. The program had been started on the assumption that the existing electric propulsion technology was mature enough for safe flight, but that turned out to not be the case.

== Design ==
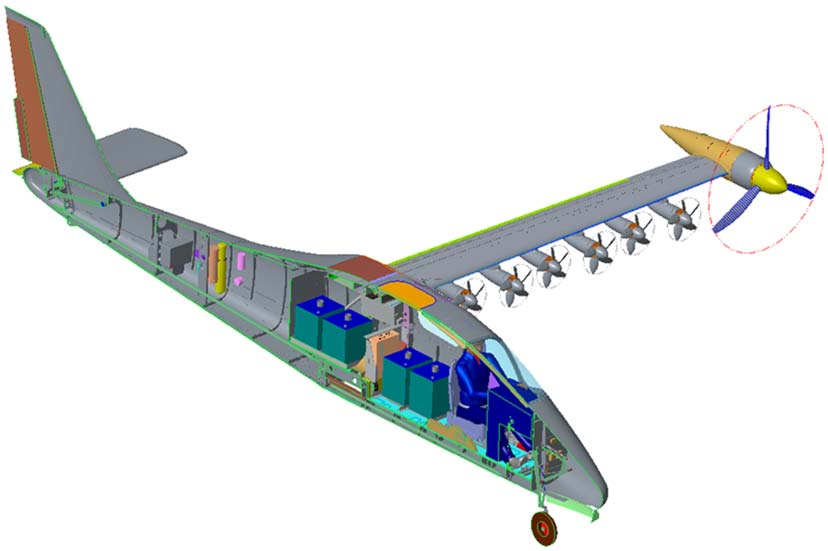
Model of the final mod 4 with centerline cut, showing battery system, high aspect ratio wing, electric motors, and traction power bus

Modified from a Tecnam P2006T, the X-57 would have been an electric aircraft, with 14 electric motors driving propellers mounted on the wing leading edges. All 14 electric motors would be used during takeoff and landing, with only the outer two used during cruise. The additional airflow over the wings created by the additional motors generates greater lift, allowing for a narrower wing. The aircraft would have seated two. It would have had a range of 100 mi (160 km) and a maximum flight time of approximately one hour. The X-57's designers hoped to reduce by five-fold the energy necessary to fly a light aircraft at 175 mph (282 km/h; 152 kn), including a threefold reduction due to switching from piston engines to battery-electric.

Distributed propulsion increases the number and decreases the size of airplane engines. Electric motors are substantially smaller and lighter than jet engines of equivalent power. This allows them to be placed in different, more favorable locations. In this case, the engines were to be mounted above and distributed along the wings rather than suspended below them.

Mounting the propellers above the wing would have increased the air flow over the wing at lower speeds, increasing its lift. The increased lift would have allowed it to operate on shorter runways. Such a wing could be only a third of the width of the wing it replaces, saving weight and fuel costs. Typical light aircraft wings are relatively large to prevent the craft from stalling (which happens at low airspeeds, when the wing cannot provide sufficient lift). Large wings are inefficient at cruising speed because they create excess drag. The wings would have been optimised for cruise, with the motors protecting it from low-speed stalls and achieving the small aircraft standard of 70 mph (113 km/h; 61 kn).

The speed of each propeller could be controlled independently, offering the ability to change the over-wing airflow pattern to cope with flying conditions, such as wind gusts. When cruising, the propellers closer to the fuselage could be folded back to further reduce drag, leaving those towards the wing tips to move the plane. Such aircraft would have no in-flight emissions, operate with less noise and reduce operating costs by an estimated 30%. Cruising efficiency was expected to increase 3.5 to 5-fold.

The 31.6 ft (9.6 m) span wing with an aspect ratio of 15 compares to a span of 37.4 ft (11.4 m) and an aspect ratio of 8.8 for the stock P2006T wing, the slender wing's chord is 2.48 ft (0.76 m) at the wing root and 1.74 ft (0.53 m) at the tip. The wing featured twelve 1.89 ft (0.58 m) diameter cruise propellers that each required 14.4 kW (19.3 hp) of motor power at 63 mph (102 km/h; 55 kn) and turn at 4,548 rpm. The five-blade propellers were to fold in cruise to reduce drag. Each wingtip hosts two 3-blade 5 ft (1.5 m) diameter cruise propellers that each required 48.1 kW (64.5 hp) at 170 mph (280 km/h; 150 kn) and turn at 2,250 rpm. The wingtip location offered favorable interaction with the wingtip vortices, expected to provide a 5% drag saving. The 47 kWh (170 MJ) battery packs weight 860 lb (390 kg) for a 121 Wh/kg density.

The high-lift array of 12 propellers was to maintain the 67 mph (107 km/h; 58 kn) stall speed. The optimized wing had 40% of the baseline area, reducing friction drag, and a wing loading 2.6 times higher. It would be 32.8 ft (10.0 m) wide but will have a 40% smaller chord, for a wing loading up from 17 to 45 psf (83 to 220 kg/m^{2}), and should have cruised at a higher lift coefficient, around 4, more than double the baseline wing.

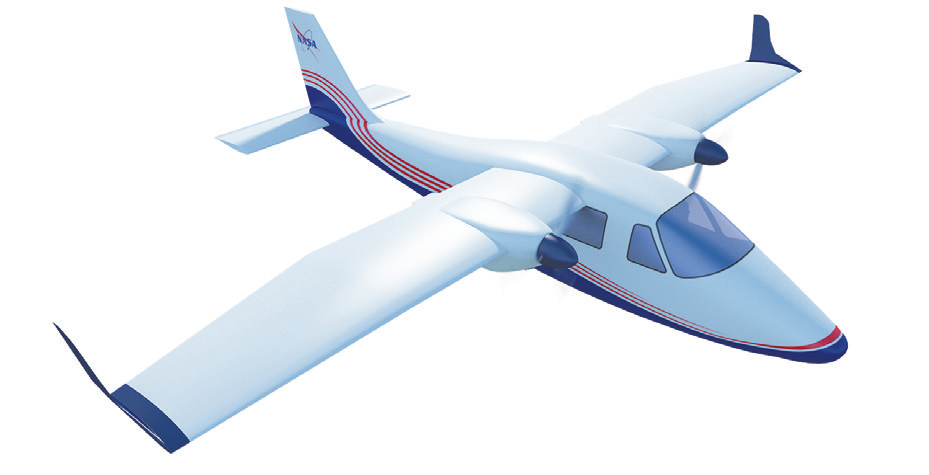
Modification II

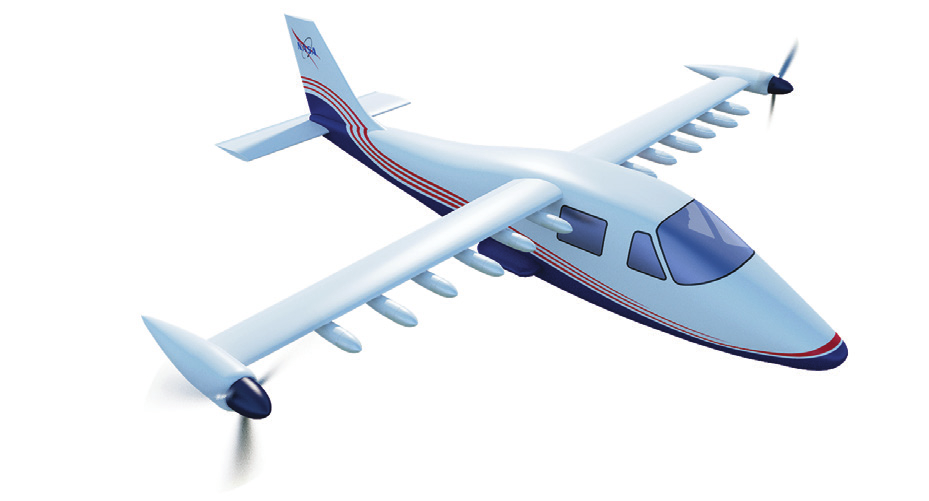
Modification III

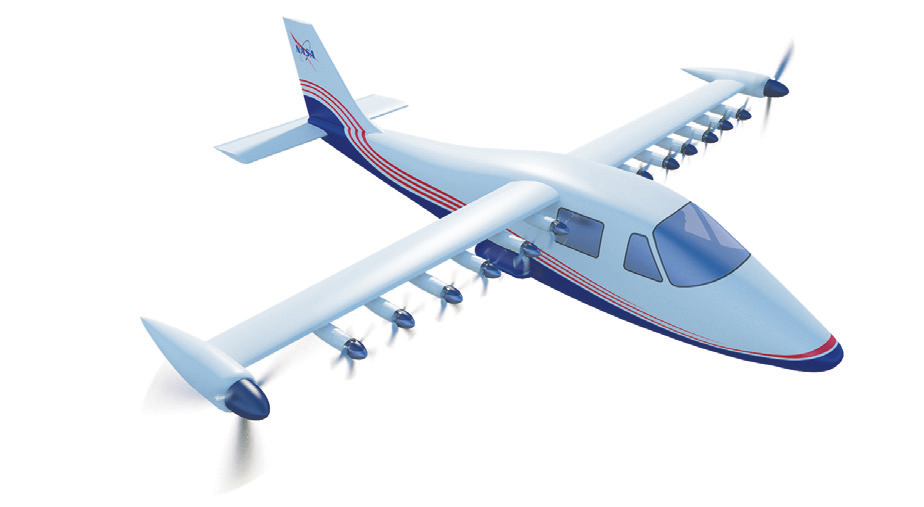
Modification IV

== Specifications (Mod IV) ==
Data from NASA

General characteristics

- Capacity: 2 people
- Wingspan: 32.8 ft (10.0 m)
- Wing area: 67.0 sq ft (6.22 m^{2}) 42% of the 14.8 m^{2} baseline area
- Aspect ratio: 15
- Gross weight: 3,000 lb (1,361 kg)
- Battery: lithium-ion, 460V, 69.1 kWh total, 47 kWh usable, 860 lb (390 kg), 80 Wh/lb (180 Wh/kg) specific energy
- Powerplant: 2 × custom electric motors, 97 hp (72 kW) each (max), 80 hp (60 kW) each (continuous),
  117 lb (53 kg) each (incl. the propeller), air-cooled, the only motors to be used during the cruise, mounted on the wing-tips
- Powerplant: 12 × custom electric motors, 14.1 hp (10.5 kW) each ,
  15 lb (6.8 kg) each (incl. the propeller), air-cooled, only for take-offs and landings, mounted on the wing leading edges
- Propellers: 2 × custom 3-blade propellers, 5 ft (1.5 m) diameter, 2,250 rpm, independently-controlled variable speed
- Propellers: 12 × custom 5-blade propellers, 1.9 ft (0.58 m) diameter, 4,548 rpm, independently-controlled variable speed, foldable

Performance

- Cruise speed: 149 kn (172 mph, 277 km/h) at 8,000 ft
- Stall speed: 58 kn (67 mph, 107 km/h)
- Range: 87 nmi (100 mi, 160 km)
- Endurance: approx. 1 hour
- Service ceiling: 14,000 ft (4,300 m)
- Wing loading: 45 lb/sq ft (220 kg/m^{2})
- Lift coefficient: 4 (possible due to the extra lift provided by propellers placed as to increase the airflow over the wings)

== See also ==
- List of electric aircraft
- Aeronautics Research Mission Directorate
- NASA GL-10 Greased Lightning — hybrid diesel-electric tilt-wing UAV
- Eviation Alice — electric 9-passenger commuter aircraft under development
- Heart ES-30 — hybrid-electric 30-passenger regional airliner under development
- Electra EL-2 Goldfinch — Distributed propulsion hybrid-electric demonstrator
