= Aurora Excalibur =

Type of aircraft

The Aurora Excalibur was an unmanned aerial vehicle (UAV) developed by Aurora Flight Sciences between 2005 and 2010 capable of vertical takeoff and landing (VTOL). The design combined ducted fans and hybrid drive. A smaller scale model with a 13-foot (4.0 m) wingspan was successfully tested on June 24, 2009. A full-scale version was to be capable of carrying four AGM-114 Hellfire missiles and traveling at 460 mph (740 km/h). Aurora used the experience of developing this vehicle to inform their submission to the Vertical Take-Off and Landing Experimental Aircraft (VTOL X-Plane) programme funded by the Defense Advanced Research Projects Agency (DARPA).
