= Aurora X-65 CRANE =

Experimental aircraft

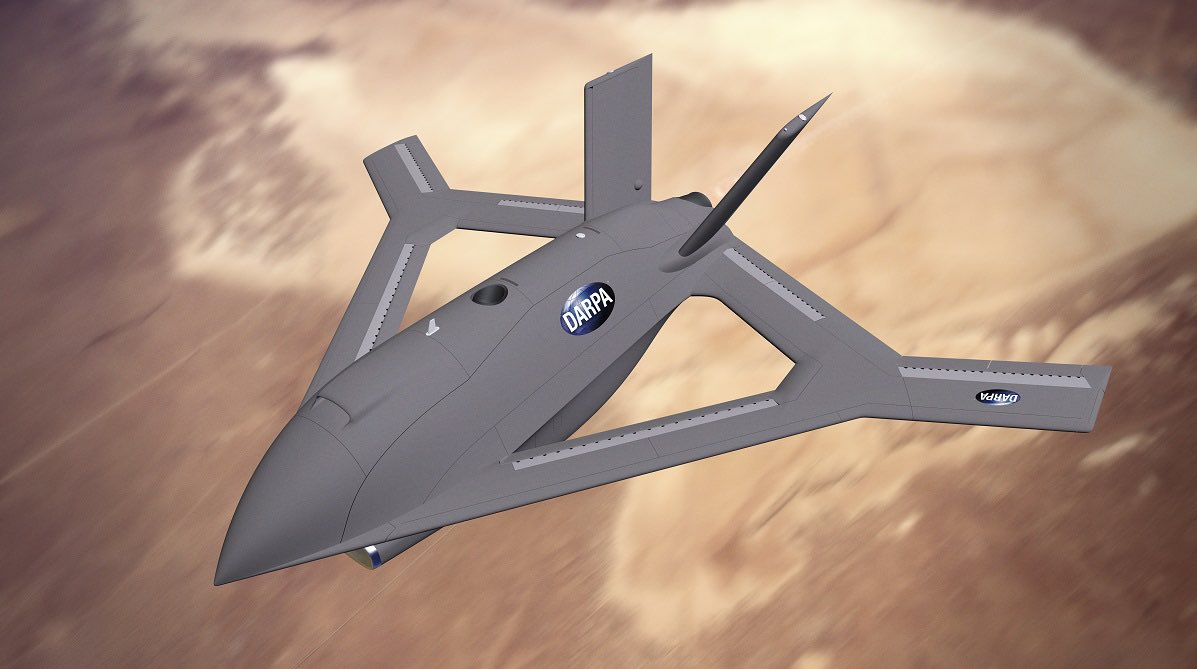
Artist's rendering of the Aurora X-65 CRANE

The Aurora X-65 CRANE is an experimental aircraft that is currently under development. In charge are the Defense Advanced Research Projects Agency (DARPA) and the Boeing subsidiary Aurora Flight Sciences.

== Purpose ==
Purpose of the X-65 aircraft is to demonstrate the feasibility of Active Flow Control (AFC). AFC utilizes bursts of air rather than moving flight control surfaces on the exterior of the wings and tail to control its flight.

== History ==
Aurora Flight Sciences embarked on the development of an experimental X-plane, as part of the DARPA's CRANE programme, in November 2020. Wind tunnel testing was also conducted in San Diego, California, in May 2022. DARPA allocated funds for the detailed engineering design of a full-scale X-plane in December 2022. Aurora Flight Sciences was commissioned to construct a full-scale X-plane in January 2024. Construction is proceeding and flight tests are to start in 2027.

== Acronym ==
The acronym CRANE refers to a DARPA programme called Control of Revolutionary Aircraft with Novel Effectors. DARPA announced the X-65 designation on its social media accounts on 15 May 2023.
