= Aurora XV-24 LightningStrike =

Experimental unmanned aerial vehicle

XV-24 LightningStrike
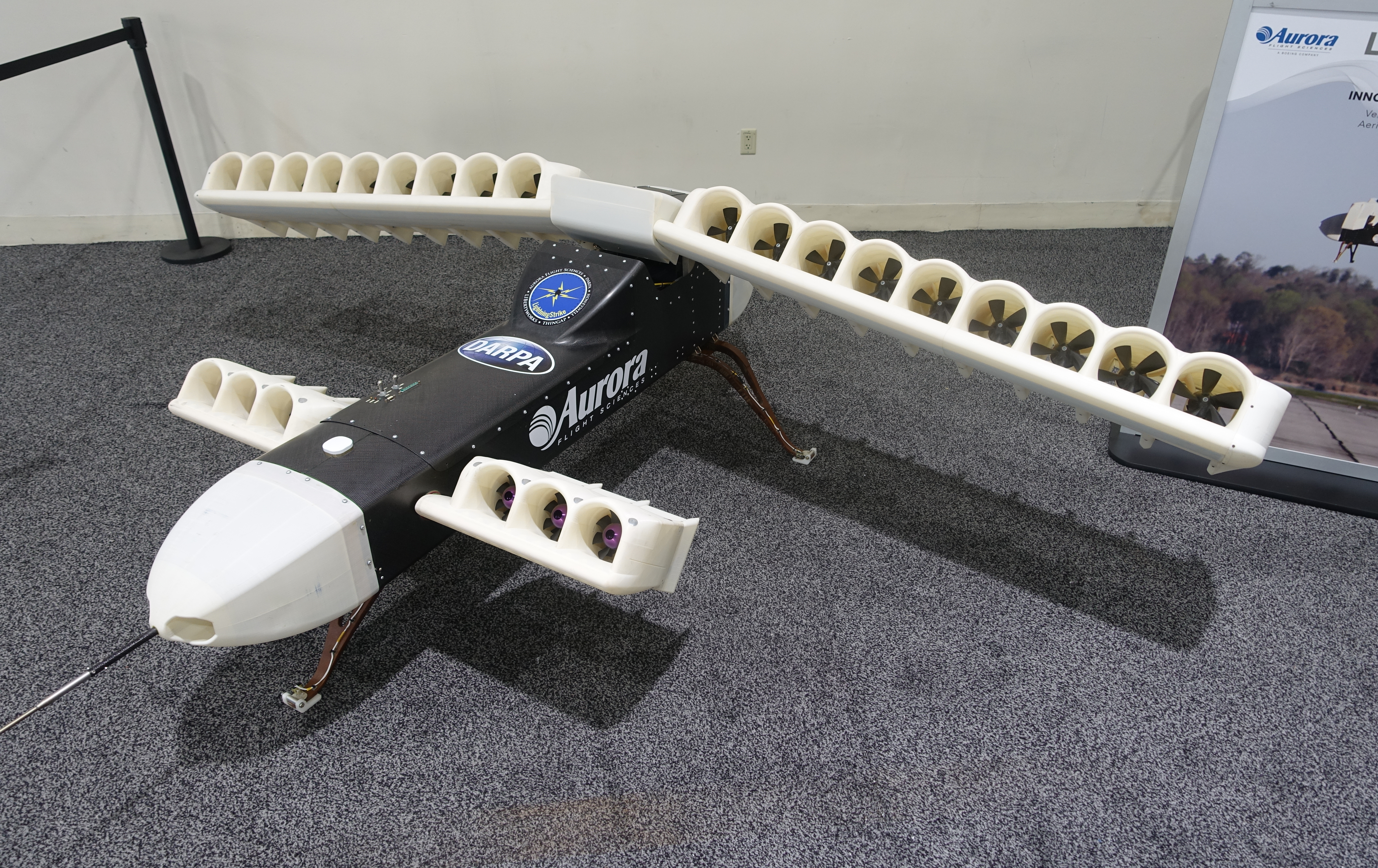
- Lightning Strike UAV at DARPA D60 Symposium

General information
- Type: Remote piloted aircraft, unmanned aerial vehicle
- Manufacturer: Aurora Flight Sciences
- Status: Canceled
- Primary user: United States Military

The Aurora XV-24 LightningStrike is an experimental unmanned aerial vehicle created by Aurora Flight Sciences and partners Rolls-Royce and Honeywell. It was developed for the Vertical Take-Off and Landing Experimental Aircraft program.

== Development ==
On 3 March 2016, DARPA awarded Aurora Flight Sciences $89.4 million to build and demonstrate their LightningStrike concept, beating out the other three competitors. Phase II of the VTOL X-Plane project will fabricate two air vehicles before flight testing, planned by September 2018. A 20 percent-scale demonstrator, weighing 325 lb (147 kg) using wings and canards made of carbon composites and 3D-printed plastics, was flown on 29 March 2016. The full-scale aircraft will be designated the XV-24A.

In April 2018, after the subscale demonstrator achieved the VTOL X-Plane major objectives, Darpa cancelled the project before flight testing due to no successor to inherit the program and growing commercial interest, as electric distributed propulsion is used in Aurora’s eVTOL aircraft developed with Uber Elevate.

== Design ==
The LightningStrike is a tilting-wing design powered by one Rolls-Royce AE1107C turboshaft engine, the same type used on the V-22 Osprey, that generates electric power via three Honeywell generators to run 24 distributed ducted fans, three each in the forward canards (each 21 in (53 cm) in diameter) and 18 across the main wing (each 31 in (79 cm) in diameter). Rather than using conventional engines like all the other entrants, the aircraft relies on "distributed electric propulsion" where the three generators that produce three megawatts (4,023 horsepower) of electricity, as much as a commercial wind turbine, power individual motors that drive the fans; each wing fan uses a 100 kW motor, and each canard fan a 70 kW motor. The air vehicle will weigh between 10,000–12,000 lb (4,500–5,400 kg), about the size of a UH-1Y Venom, and cruise faster than 300 knots.

== See also ==
- Lilium Jet
- List of unmanned aerial vehicles
- List of active United States military aircraft
