= Aurora Goldeneye =

General information
- Type: Reconnaissance UAV
- National origin: United States
- Manufacturer: Aurora Flight Sciences

History
- First flight: 2003 (Goldeneye 100) 2004 (Goldeneye 50)

The Aurora Goldeneye is a reconnaissance UAV under development in the United States of America during the first decade of the 21st century. It is a ducted fan design in roughly the same class as the Sikorsky Cypher II. This UAV was built under a DARPA contract and is apparently focused on covert or special forces operations.

The Goldeneye is a "tail-sitter" or "pogo" machine that takes off and lands straight up. It is a stumpy-looking machine with four tailfins, each with landing gear on the fintip, and a wing that pivots, allowing it to be aligned with the aircraft centerline in cruise flight and at a right angle to the centerline in hover flight.

The Goldeneye is built of graphite and fiberglass composites, and has a low radar, infrared, and acoustic signature. It is powered by a 28 kW (38 hp) Wankel-rotary engine from AV Engines Ltd in the UK. It has an autonomous flight control system with GPS-INS navigation.

The aircraft can carry a small electo-optic sensor turret or other payload and features a radio datalink. Apparently the DARPA specification mysteriously required that it be able to carry "two coke-can size payloads" that were not described further. Aurora is working on a half-scale version of the Goldeneye for commercial sales.

The Goldeneye was initially developed and manufactured mainly by Aurora Flight Sciences, though later versions (i.e. the goldeneye 50 & 80) were developed by "Team Goldeneye", led by Aurora, in collaboration with Northrop Grumman, Signal Systems Corporation and General Dynamics Robotics Systems.

== Specifications (Goldeneye 100) ==
General characteristics

- Crew: None
- Wingspan: 10 ft 0 in (3.00 m)
- Diameter: 3 ft 0 in (0.90 m)
- Height: 5 ft 6 in (1.70 m)
- Empty weight: 105 lb (48 kg)
- Gross weight: 150 lb (68 kg)
- Powerplant: 1 × UAV Engines AR741 , 38 hp (28 kW)

Performance

- Maximum speed: 185 mph (295 km/h, 161 kn)
- Range: 620 mi (1,000 km, 540 nmi)

== Specifications (Goldeneye 50) ==
Data from https://defense-update.com/20040426_goldeneye50.html

General characteristics

- Crew: None
- Capacity: 1 kg payload
- Wingspan: 1.4 m (4 ft 7 in)
- Height: 0.7 m (2 ft 4 in)
- Empty weight: 7 kg (16 lb)
- Gross weight: 10 kg (22 lb)

Performance

- Maximum speed: 280 km/h (170 mph, 150 kn)
- Cruise speed: 100 km/h (62 mph, 54 kn)
