= Aurora Flight Sciences =

American aviation and aeronautics research subsidiary of Boeing

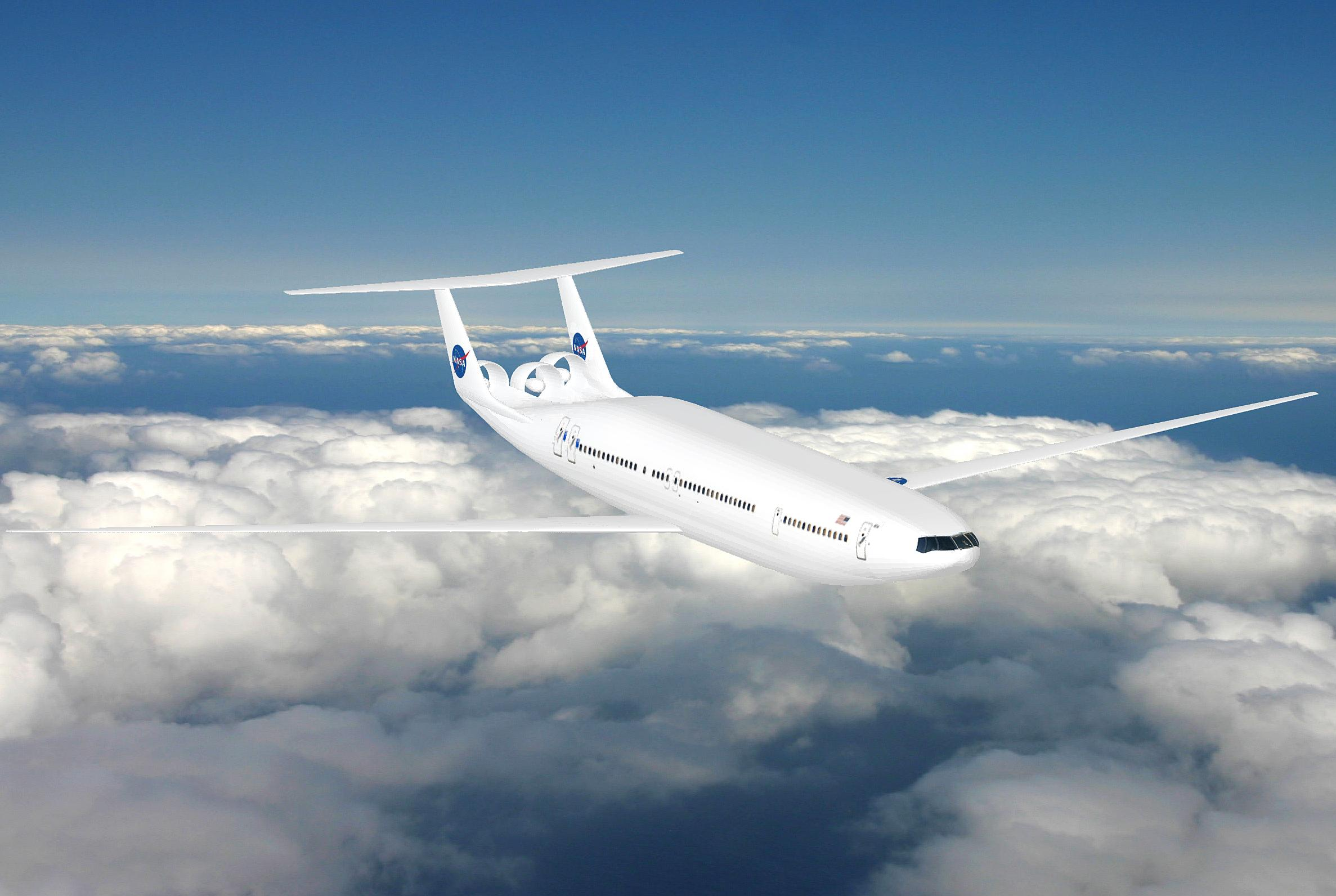
- NASA / Aurora D8 airliner concept
- Type: Subsidiary
- Industry: Aerospace manufacturer
- Founded: 1989; 37 years ago
- Founder: John S. Langford III
- Headquarters: Manassas, Virginia, United States
- Number of locations: 4
- Key people: Michael Caimona (president and CEO)
- Products: Unmanned aerial vehicles
- Number of employees: 468
- Parent: Boeing
- Website: www.aurora.aero

Aurora Flight Sciences (AFS) is an American aviation and aeronautics research subsidiary of Boeing that specializes in special-purpose unmanned aerial vehicles. Aurora's headquarters is at Manassas Regional Airport.

== History ==
In 1989, AFS was founded in Alexandria, Virginia, as a follow-on to the MIT Daedalus project.

In 1991, its first aircraft was the Perseus proof of concept (POC) built for NASA which first flew at NASA Dryden. It was followed by two Perseus As and one Perseus B – built for the NASA ERAST Program. A twin engine Theseus was also built.

In 1995, Aurora joined the Global Hawk team to build composite fuselage components and tail assemblies of the RQ-4 for Northrop Grumman and the USAF.

In 2002, a demonstration aircraft Mars High Altitude Deployment Demonstrator was flown from an altitude of 100,000 feet to simulate the low density of the Martian atmosphere. Aurora was involved in NASA programs studying how to fly on Mars.

In 2008, the DARPA Vulture aimed for a UAV that could stay aloft in the stratosphere for at least five years carrying a 1,000 lb (450 kg) payload: Aurora proposed three drones taking off separately then joining up in flight, to form an efficient flat wing at night, and folding into a Z to optimize solar energy collection.

In 2009, as Aurora developed small vertical take-off UAVs known as the Aurora Goldeneye, the third variant of this family, the GoldenEye-80, was first flown publicly at Association for Unmanned Vehicle Systems International's Unmanned Systems North America trade show.

On 5 October 2017, Boeing announced that it would acquire Aurora Flight Sciences.

In April 2018, as DARPA allowed Aurora to transition government-funded technology for commercial applications, the tilt-wing XV-24A Lightning Strike and its distributed propulsion could be reused for an electric commercial air taxi along its lift-and-cruise prototype with vertical flight rotors and cruise fixed propellers, unveiled in 2017. Aurora planned multiple demonstrators controlled centrally by 2020 and a piloted air taxi by 2023 with autonomy later depending on regulation.

In spring 2019, Aurora planned to fly a High-Altitude Long Endurance drone powered by solar cells and batteries, Odysseus. The project was indefinitely delayed in July 2019.

In 2023 Aurora won a DARPA CRANE (Control of Revolutionary Aircraft with Novel Effectors) grant to test a small-scale plane that uses compressed air bursts instead of external moving parts such as flaps. The program seeks to eliminate the weight, drag, and mechanical complexity involved in moving control surfaces. The air bursts modify the air pressure and flow, and change the boundaries between streams of air moving at different speeds. The company built a 25% scale prototype with 11 conventional control surfaces, as well as 14 banks fed by eight air channels. Its X-65 test aircraft was originally scheduled to fly in 2026, but slipped to late 2026.

== Facilities ==
Aurora has four facilities that each have their own focus. Corporate Headquarters and Engineering are in Manassas, Virginia. A manufacturing center was opened in Fairmont, West Virginia, in 1994, being moved to Bridgeport, West Virginia, in 2000. Another manufacturing facility was opened in Starkville, Mississippi, in 2005 before being moved to the nearby Golden Triangle Regional Airport in Columbus, Mississippi, in 2007. A research and development center was opened in Cambridge, Massachusetts, in 2005 where Aurora now develops a line of micro air vehicles.

== Aircraft ==
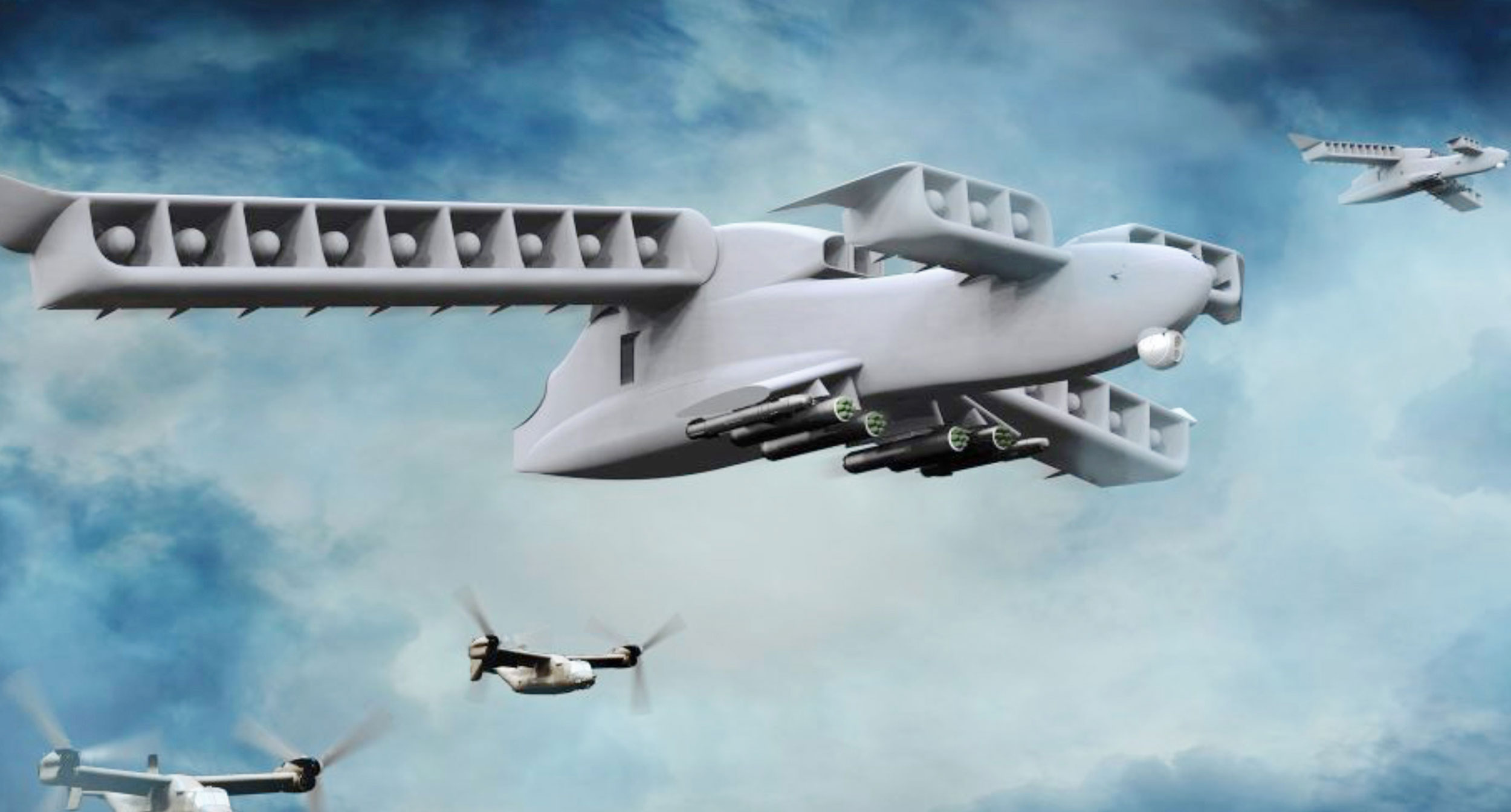
Aurora LightningStrike VTOL X-Plane

- Perseus POC
- Perseus A
- Theseus
- Perseus B
- Chiron
- MarsFlyer
- GoldenEye 100
- GoldenEye 50
- GoldenEye 80
- Excalibur
- Centaur Optionally-Piloted Aircraft (OPA)
- Orion
- SunLight Eagle
- Odysseus
- Skate SUAS
- Tactical Autonomous Aerial Logistics System (TALOS)
  - H-6U Unmanned Little Bird
  - Bell 206
  - UH-1H UAV

=== Proposed ===
- Aurora D8 for NASA by the Massachusetts Institute of Technology - currently under development. A flight test will be conducted by some point in the near future.
- Virgin Galactic generation 2 mothership, for the next-generation Delta-class spaceplane, expected for 2025.
- Liberty Lifter

=== Cancelled ===
- United States Air Force Advanced Composite Cargo Aircraft (ACCA) - lost out to Lockheed Martin X-55.
- The Aurora XV-24 LightningStrike was the selected proposal for the VTOL X-Plane program, cancelled in April 2018.

== Other products ==
- Robotic Copilot

== See also ==
- Aurora X-65 CRANE
