= Distributed propulsion =

Engines placed along the wingspan of a plane

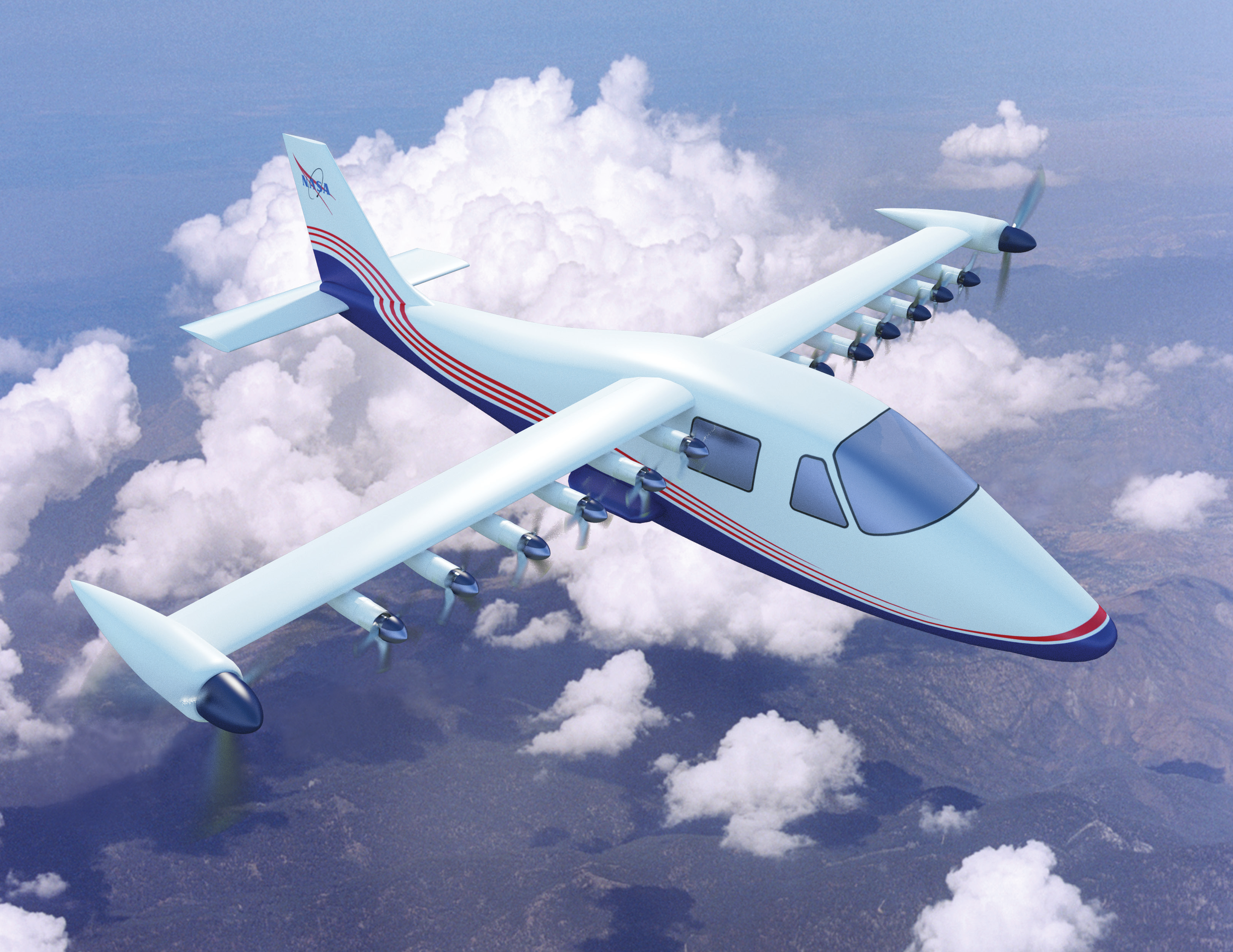
NASA X-57 Maxwell (Sceptor) experimental aircraft

In aeronautics, distributed propulsion is an arrangement in which the propulsive units and related air flows are distributed over the aerodynamic surfaces of an aircraft. The purpose is to improve the aircraft aerodynamic, propulsive or structural efficiency over an equivalent conventional design.

Distributed propulsion can provide benefits regarding aerodynamic characteristics, efficiency, noise, takeoff and landing distance, redundancy, control, structures and aeroelasticity.

Distributed propulsion may be accomplished by spanwise distribution of partially or fully embedded multiple small propulsors, such as fans, propellers and electric motors, along the wing. Alternatively, it may involve ducting exhaust gases along the wing trailing edge.

== Definition and design principles ==
=== Definition ===
Within the context of an air transportation system, distributed propulsion (DP) can be described as a propulsion system where the vehicle thrust is produced from an array of propulsors located across the aircraft. The distributed thrust capabilities of a DP system should produce an improvement of the system-level efficiency, capabilities, or performance of the air vehicle, otherwise, any aircraft with more than one propulsor could be classified as DP. Hence, distributed propulsion on an aircraft is typically characterised not only by the distributed nature of the thrust but also by the effect this has on the aircraft aerodynamics. The propulsive air flows are distributed over the aerodynamic surfaces of the aircraft, typically spanwise over a fixed wing. These flows may interact with other air flowing over the wing and substantially affect the aerodynamics.

Several broad classes of distributed propulsion system have been identified:

- Distributed jet or jet flaps (distributed exhaust).
- Multiple small independent propulsors, individually powered.
- Distributed propulsors driven by one or more power sources through various power transmission methods.
- Cross-flow fans, which are a type of horizontal-axis rotor.

=== Aerodynamic functions ===
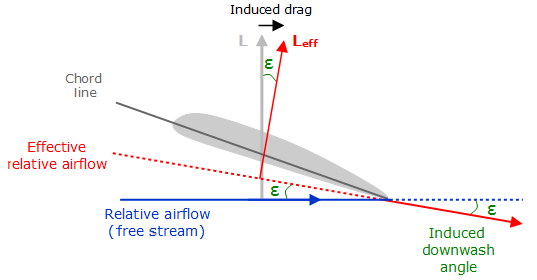
Lift and lift-induced drag forces scheme

In addition to providing propulsion, distributed propulsion arrangements have been studied with a view to providing various aerodynamic functions. These include:

- Lift increase and induced drag reduction due to the increased flow velocity of the propeller slipstream effect, which produces increased aerodynamic efficiency.
- Increased pitching moment due to increased lift and change in downwash over the horizontal tail.
- Increased thrust coefficient.
- Direct reenergizing of the boundary layer.
- Vortex and Flow separation control.
- Flight control and vectored thrust.

=== Potential benefits ===
Several areas have been identified in which distributed propulsion may offer benefits over conventional designs. These include fuel efficiency, noise abatement, steep climbing for short take off and landing (STOL), and novel control approaches, in particular eliminating control surfaces for roll, pitch and yaw moments. It has also been suggested that smaller propulsors will be cheaper to manufacture and easier to handle during assembly and maintenance.

Placing propellers at the wingtips improves propulsive efficiency and increases the wing's effective aspect ratio. Additionally, aft-mounted propulsors can ingest the aircraft’s boundary layer, which lowers fuel consumption and optimizes cruise performance.

Distributed propulsion systems also significantly increase the maximum lift coefficient by accelerating airflow over the wing at low speeds, an effect that can be further amplified by ducting bleed air through jet flaps. This high-lift capability allows for smaller wings, which reduce cruise drag and improve ride quality without compromising stall speed or takeoff and landing performance. Furthermore, the boost in maximum lift enables short takeoff and landing operations, making previously impossible mission profiles viable, while blown control surfaces augment flight control and enhance safety during low-speed flight.

Flight safety is further improved by the inherent engine redundancy of DP systems, meaning an engine failure is less critical to total thrust and controllability than in conventional configurations.

At the same time, mounting engines above the wing significantly reduces noise levels, leading to a quieter cabin for passengers and reduced noise pollution for communities and wildlife near airports.

Finally, distributing engines along the span provides notable structural advantages. This layout alleviates aeroelastic issues like flutter and mitigates gust loads through better weight distribution. Furthermore, the physical weight of the engines counteracts wing lift during cruise, providing inertia relief that ultimately reduces the overall wing load.

== History ==
Multi-engine installations have been a feature of aeroplanes since the introduction of the Sikorsky Ilya Muromets shortly before World War One. However most do not significantly modify the airflow over the wings and are not always treated as distributed propulsion.

In 1963 the Hunting H.126 research aircraft was built by the Hunting Aircraft company to investigate the direct use of a jet flap for propulsion, using a turbojet engine whose exhaust would be directed over the full span of both the flaps and ailerons. From the engine an additional bifurcated duct ran aft through either side of the fuselage, providing additional thrust.

The Ball-Bartoe Jetwing was a US manned research aircraft flown in the 1970s to investigate blown wing and jet-flap technologies, featuring a turbofan and a slot along the wingspan through which air from the engine could be discharged.

The ShinMaywa US-2 flying boat used blown flaps to improve short takeoff and landing (STOL) performance and subsequently entered production in 2003.

FanWing began development of the crossflow fan as a combined lift and propulsion system in 1997 and over the next few years flew several models and research drones. Subsequent research in the US focused on the use of a crossflow fan inset into the wing upper trailing edge, as the primary driver for boundary layer control and jet flap propulsion.

More recently, several unmanned aerial vehicle (UAV) projects have explored the potential of distributed propulsion to offer noise abatement, fuel efficiency and short-field performance.

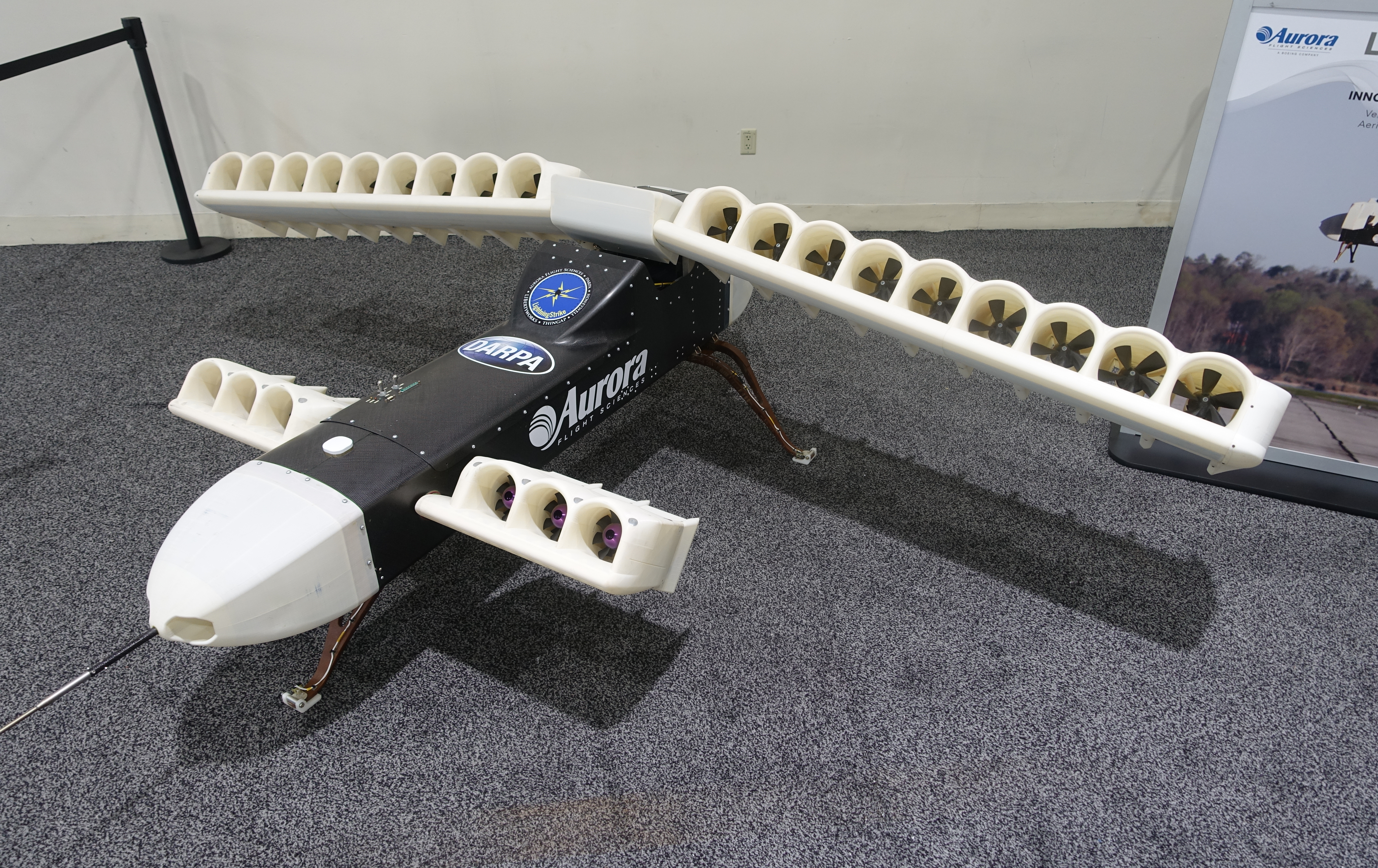
Aurora XV-24 LightningStrike UAV

The Aurora XV-24 LightningStrike research UAV was developed in 2016 and featured distributed electric fans completely embedded in the wing. The full-scale aircraft was designed as tilting-wing providing not only vertical takeoff and landing (VTOL) capability, but also high cruise speed. It was powered by one Rolls-Royce AE1107C turboshaft engine, that generated electric power via three Honeywell generators to run 24 distributed ducted fans, six in the forward canard and 18 across the main wing. However, the program was cancelled before entering full-scale development.

The Lilium Jet used multiple small ducted propellers driven by electric motors to provide lift during vertical take-off and landing, and thrust during the cruise phase. Flight testing of full-scale unmanned prototypes was performed from 2017. However, the development halted for bankruptcy in 2024.

The NASA X-57 Maxwell (Sceptor) was a manned NASA X-plane developed from 2016, featuring 14 distributed electric motors and propellers, 2 on the wing tips for the cruise phase and 12 smaller ones to generate high lift during takeoff and landing. It was designed based on the general aviation aircraft Tecnam P2006T. Also in this case, the development halted due to safety problems with the electric propulsion system.

The Airbus Vahana project started in 2016 to develop an unmanned eight-propeller eVTOL, which could be flown also in electric helicopter configuration, tailored for urban air mobility and on-demand air transport applications. The project finished in 2019, after 138 flight tests.

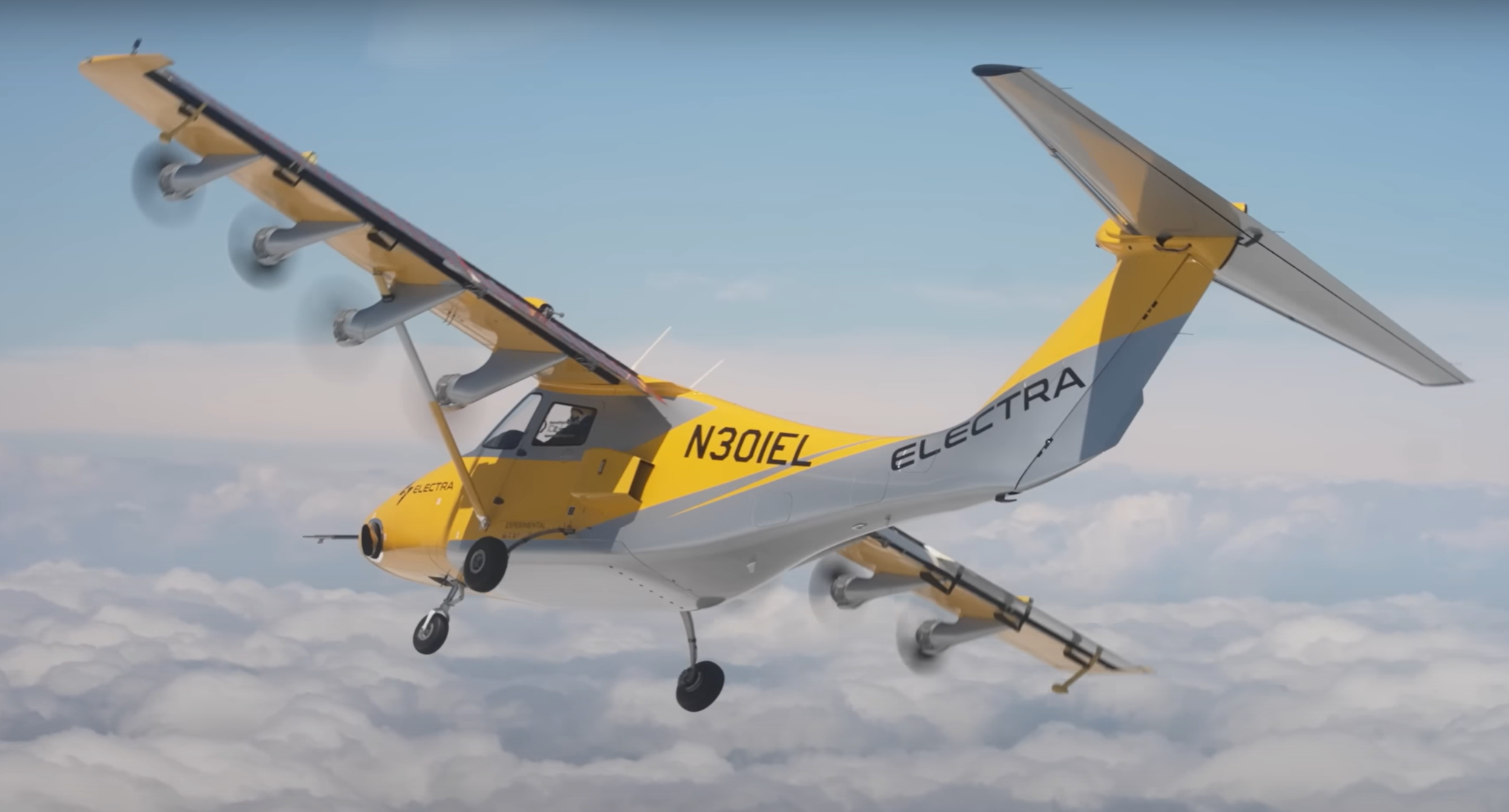
Electra EL-2 Goldfinch aircraft by Electra Aero.

The Joby Aviation S4 is an Hybrid-electric unmanned eVTOL by Joby Aviation, still under development, mainly designed for air-taxi operations.

The Electra EL-2 Goldfinch is a manned fixed-wing distributed electric propulsion aircraft, developed by the American company Electra.aero. The experimental demonstrator features a turboelectric powertrain with battery pack, and is currently under development.

== Distributed electric propulsion ==
Distributed electric propulsion (DEP) is characterized by multiple small fans or propellers, directly driven by an individual, lightweight electric motor. The term "engines" is usually avoided to prevent confusion between the aircraft's power sources and its propulsors. A defining feature of a DEP system is the complete mechanical decoupling between components, meaning that the thrust-producing propulsors do not share a common mechanical driveshaft or mechanical power source with the power-producing elements. Instead, the architecture relies on a flexible combination of power sources, such as electric generators, fuel cells, and energy storage devices, and propulsors like electrically-driven propellers or fans. By entirely decoupling the power sources from the propulsive devices, DEP opens the door to innovative aircraft configurations, provided that highly-efficient, compact electric machines and transmission systems are employed. Additionally, distributed electric propulsion represents a promising solution among unconventional aircraft design concepts, because the interaction between the propellers and the wing is exploited in the attempt of increasing the overall aerodynamic performance, efficiency, control authority and system redundancy.

=== Systems and technologies ===
One of the inherent features of a DEP-enabled aircraft is the tight integration of the propulsion system into the wing-body surfaces of the aircraft. With the increased number of propulsion units near the aircraft’s aerodynamic surfaces, a level of aero-propulsive coupling will be present. This coupling depends largely on the type of propulsion unit in use and the proximity of those propulsion units to the wings, tail surfaces, or fuselage.

The benefits of aero-propulsive coupling can be broken into several categories. First, a wide range of vehicle configurations which have been developed claims propulsive efficiency benefits due to boundary-layer ingestion. Second, the strategic placement of propulsors can reduce vehicle drag through a variety of mechanisms, including wake filling and vortex suppression. Finally, various applications have been developed which make use of the propeller or fan slipstream interacting with an aerodynamic surface to produce some form of enhanced lift or control authority.

One of the early DEP concepts is called turboelectric distributed propulsion (TeDP), which is currently being studied across various research and industry organizations. The TeDP concept employs a number of highly-efficient, light-weight electric motors to drive a number of distributed electric fans. The electric power to drive these fans is generated by separately-located electric generators, which are driven by one or more gas turbines. This arrangement enables the use of many small distributed electric fans, while retaining the superior efficiency of large engine cores that are physically separated from the propulsors, yet connected to the fans through a highly efficient electric power transmission system.

In addition to TeDP propulsion systems, other DEP systems are also being proposed and developed for conventional, short and vertical take-off and landing aircraft applications. As a conventional fixed-wing configuration, NASA’s X-57 Maxwell aircraft employs 12 small electrically-driven propellers mounted at the leading edge of the wing and 2 large electric propellers at the wing-tips, with electric power provided solely by a set of battery packs.

The NASA LEAPtech aircraft, a precursor of the X-57, uses multiple electric motors in a general aviation aircraft to produce improved cruise efficiency. The LEAPTech concept takes an aggressive approach of laterally distributing the thrust across the wing to achieve a high lift system capable of generating high maximum lift, while avoiding the structural complexity of multi-element wing systems (such as flaps). The resulting impact is the ability to cruise at high speed at a lift coefficient near the optimum, with a greater than a 60% improvement in aerodynamic efficiency.

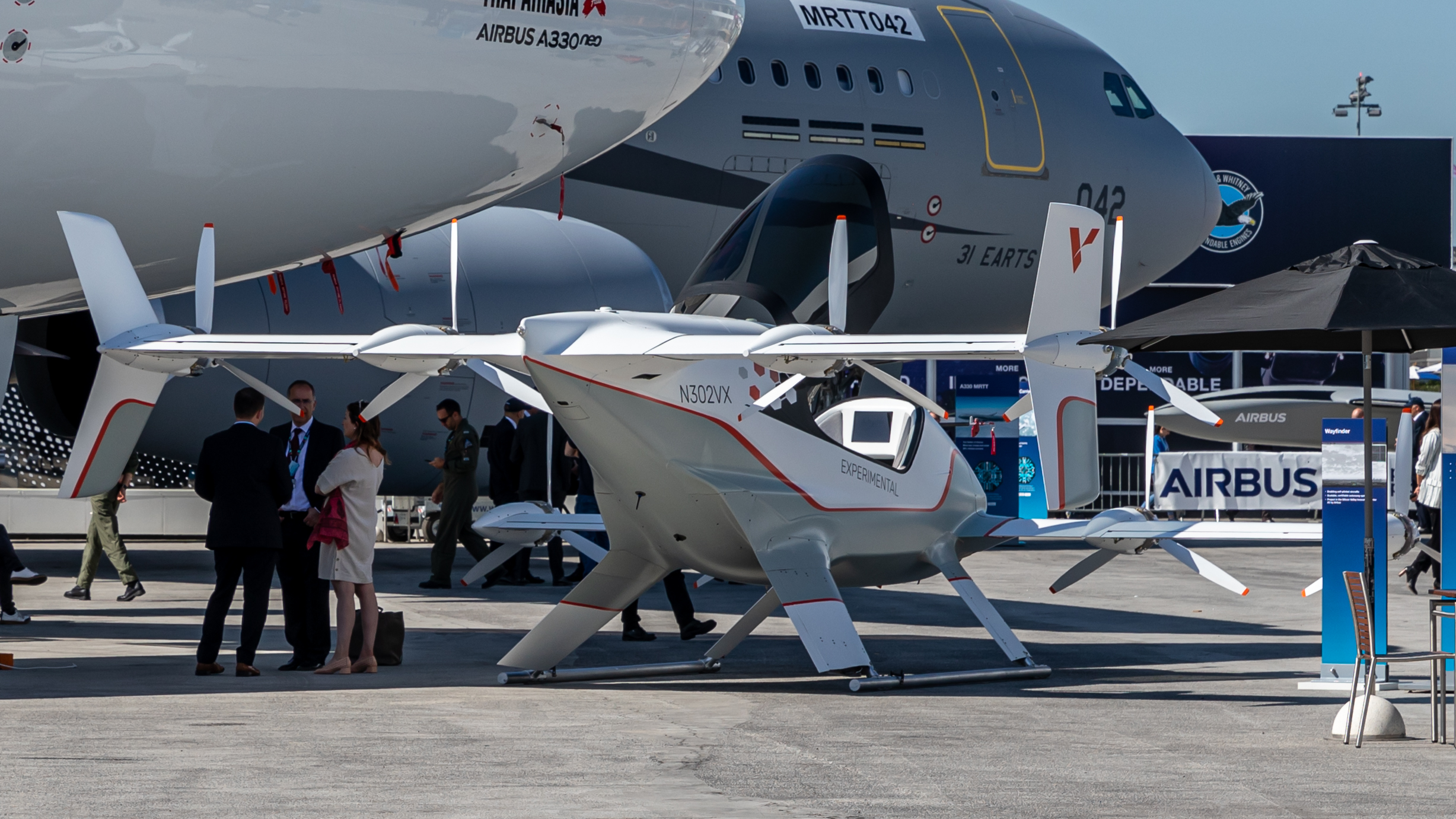
Airbus A3 Vahana eVTOL.

In the field of electric VTOL (eVTOL) aircraft, there are now a number of configurations proposed and developed for a new emerging “air-taxi” market, to not only relieve urban traffic congestion, but also to provide “on-demand” air service. Examples of these VTOL aircraft concepts include the Joby Aviation (Santa Cruz, California) S2 and S4 aircraft, the Lilium jet (Munich, Germany), and the Airbus (Leiden, Netherlands) Vahana aircraft concept.

The advantages of distributed propulsion for lightweight, high aspect ratio solar-powered aeroplanes have been studied by the AeroVironment HALSOL/Pathfinder/Helios projects, begun in 1983, and the X-HALE projects from University of Michigan, with significant flight testing performed from around 2012.

=== Research and model identification methods ===
The placement of multiple propellers along the wing leading edge significantly alters the flow field, influencing both performance and flying qualities. In this configuration, DEP introduces a strong coupling between aerodynamic and propulsive effects due to the blowing phenomenon, where the propeller slipstream accelerates the local airflow over the wing. This increases lift but also alters drag and aerodynamic moments, leading to a complex interaction in which aerodynamic and thrust contributions cannot be easily separated. The aerodynamic coupling between propeller slipstreams and the airframe introduces strong nonlinearities that challenge conventional modeling techniques.

In 2015, NASA has been studying the potential impacts of electric propulsion technologies on the design of aircraft. Because electric motors are much smaller and lighter than conventional engines, these motors can be placed in many different locations on the aircraft more easily than conventional engines. Additionally, because electric motors are a near "scale-free" technology, it is possible to distribute many smaller electric motors without encountering large efficiency reductions or weight penalties. These properties of electric motors enable designers to distribute motors and propellers to achieve synergistic aeropropulsive coupling, as well as structural, control and safety benefits.

Model identification methods applied to the study of aero-propulsive coupling involve the use of nonlinear tools, based either on aerodynamic simulation techniques such as the Vortex Lattice Method (VLM) or direct analysis of flight data. In particular, it has been shown that standard flight-test-based identification techniques like the Equation Error and Output Error methods are effective for a reliable estimation of the model dynamics, especially if used in combination with powerful simulation tools like XFLR5 and VLM. However, most investigations of DEP aerodynamics rely primarily on wind tunnel experiments or numerical simulations.

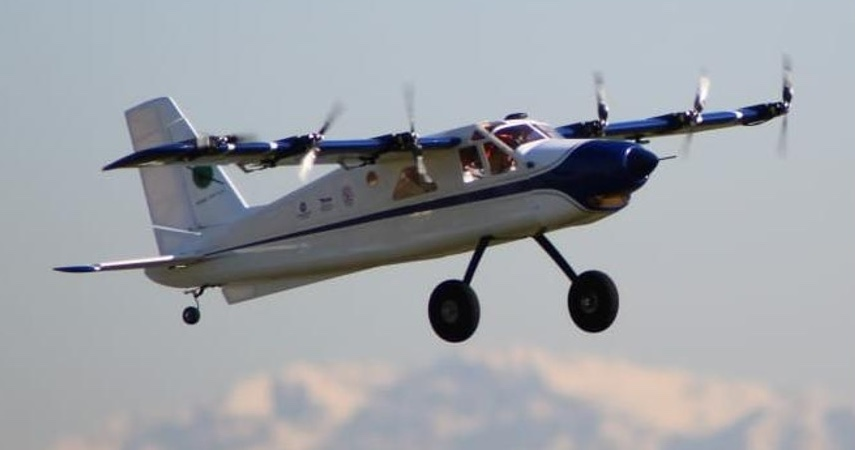
SwitchMaster research UAV.

Other works adopt a flight-testing approach based on scaled demonstrators, enabling full-aircraft-level analysis of the aero-propulsive interaction in real-flight conditions. In particular, automated flight testing techniques have been employed to perform precise excitation maneuvers for aerodynamic model identification, as in the studies involving the SwitchMaster, a scaled remotely-piloted aircraft developed at the Polytechnic University of Milan as part of the experimental research surrounding DEP. It is designed to validate DEP aerodynamics, control laws, and automated flight methodologies. An automatic flight control architecture was developed, which enables accurate execution of predefined test inputs (such as elevator doublets) in steady level flight, climbs and descents, including high flight path angle trajectories, which are essential to stimulate DEP-specific blowing effects.

== Aeroelasticity ==
When heavy propulsion units are distributed along a wing, this allows the wing structure to be made lighter. Distributing the electric motors along the span was able to control how the airframe flexed in flight, allowing the structure to be much lighter than the conventional rigid equivalent. However, their weight and thrust can interact with the natural tendency of the wing to flex under varying loads (aeroelasticity). This can cause problems, for example it was a major cause of a crash involving the NASA Helios research aircraft. One solution investigated is the use of active aeroelastic controls to correct or even make use of wing flexing during flight.

== See also ==
- Index of aviation articles
- Propulsion
- Electric propulsion
- Lift-to-drag ratio
- Lift-induced drag
- Aerodynamics
- Turbine–electric powertrain
- Advanced air mobility
- EVTOL
- Electra EL-2 Goldfinch
- Airbus Vahana
- NASA X-57 Maxwell
- Joby Aviation
